= Mounette Dutilleul =

Mounette Dutilleul (1 March 1910 – 19 September 1996) was a French Communist and a member of the French Resistance during the Second World War.

== Early life ==
She was born in Montmartre, Paris. Her father was Émile Dutilleul, the Treasurer of the French Communist Party (PCF). After attending the local school, she planned to become a history teacher, but the family's income would not allow her to pursue further studies, so she became a shorthand typist, beginning work in 1927. In 1929, she married a German Communist, Aloys Bayer, and travelled with him to Berlin and later to Moscow, where she worked for the Komintern. On their return to Berlin in 1932, she joined the Communist Party of Germany, but returned to Paris the following year when Adolf Hitler took power. She and her husband had one daughter, Hélène, born in 1936 and mainly brought up by Mounette's mother in the years that followed.

== Wartime activities ==
She had a close relationship with a fellow Communist, Arthur Dallidet, whom she first met in 1930, and they worked together closely within the political movement. By the time they met again, in 1937, Dallidet had entered a marriage of convenience with a Lithuanian Communist colleague. When war broke out, they joined the Resistance movement together, becoming the first of the "cyclistes du Hurepoix". Dallidet was shot by the Germans in May 1942.

Dutilleul bought a small house near Bordeaux, in order to shelter and liaise with the Communist Resistance leader Charles Tillon. Other Resistance agents with whom she worked included Danielle Casanova, Henri Raynaud, Victor Michaut, Claudine Chomat, Jeanne Têtard, Georgette Cadras and Félix Cadras.

She was arrested on 15 May 1941, using the false name "Jeanne Dessard", and was sentenced to four years imprisonment, which she began serving at Petite Roquette, Fresnes Prison and Rennes. In 1942 or 1943, when her true identity was discovered, she was transported to Ravensbrück concentration camp.

== Post-war ==
Dutilleul was a member of the central committee of the PCF from 1945 to 1950, but was not re-elected, possibly because of her tacit support for Tito.

Shortly after the war ended, she married Jean Nicolas, an architect. She joined a Communist cell at Boulogne and worked as a journalist on Vie ouvrière. She was an adherent of Benoît Frachon.
