= André Tollet =

French upholsterer, trade unionist and communist

André Charles Adrien Tollet
- Born: 1 July 1913; Paris, France
- Died: 14 December 2001 (aged 88)
- Occupation: Upholsterer

André Charles Adrien Tollet (1 July 1913 – 14 December 2001) was a French upholsterer, trade unionist and communist. He played a central role as chairman of the Paris liberation committee in the days leading up to the Liberation of Paris in 1944.

== Early years ==
André Charles Adrien Tollet was born on 1 July 1913, in the 14th arrondissement of Paris. His father was a small tradesman. He left school in 1926 at the age of thirteen and became an apprentice upholsterer in the Faubourg Saint-Antoine. He recorded in his memoirs that the district still retained its traditions from the French Revolution, and that he paraded for the first time before he was fifteen. He joined the Confédération générale du travail unitaire (CGTU, United General Confederation of Labor) at the age of 16, then joined the Jeunesses communistes (Young Communists), where he was made responsible for young apprentices.

Raymond Guyot invited Tollet to represent the Communist Youth in 1936 at the Red Syndicalist International in Moscow. After his return to Paris he participated in the May–June 1936 strikes. He became a full-time union worker in 1936, and was secretary of the Departmental Union of Parisian workers' unions. He supported the Republicans in the Spanish Civil War (1936–39) by organizing collections, and in 1938 went to Spain with a convoy of shoes. In Spain he met Henri Tanguy, a Parisian from a Breton family who was political commissar of the XIV International Brigade.

== World War II ==
Tollet was mobilized at the start of World War II (1939–45). After the Fall of France, in July 1940 Tollet, Eugène Hénaff and Jean-Pierre Timbaud began to form popular committees in the work places and clandestine unions. He was arrested in October 1940 with other communist party politicians and activists, and was imprisoned for fifteen months in Fresnes Prison and then in the Rouillet camp. He was transferred to Royallieu-Compiègne internment camp. He escaped from this camp through a tunnel on 22 June 1942 with 18 other communist militants, and joined the clandestine organization of the French Communist Party (PCF).

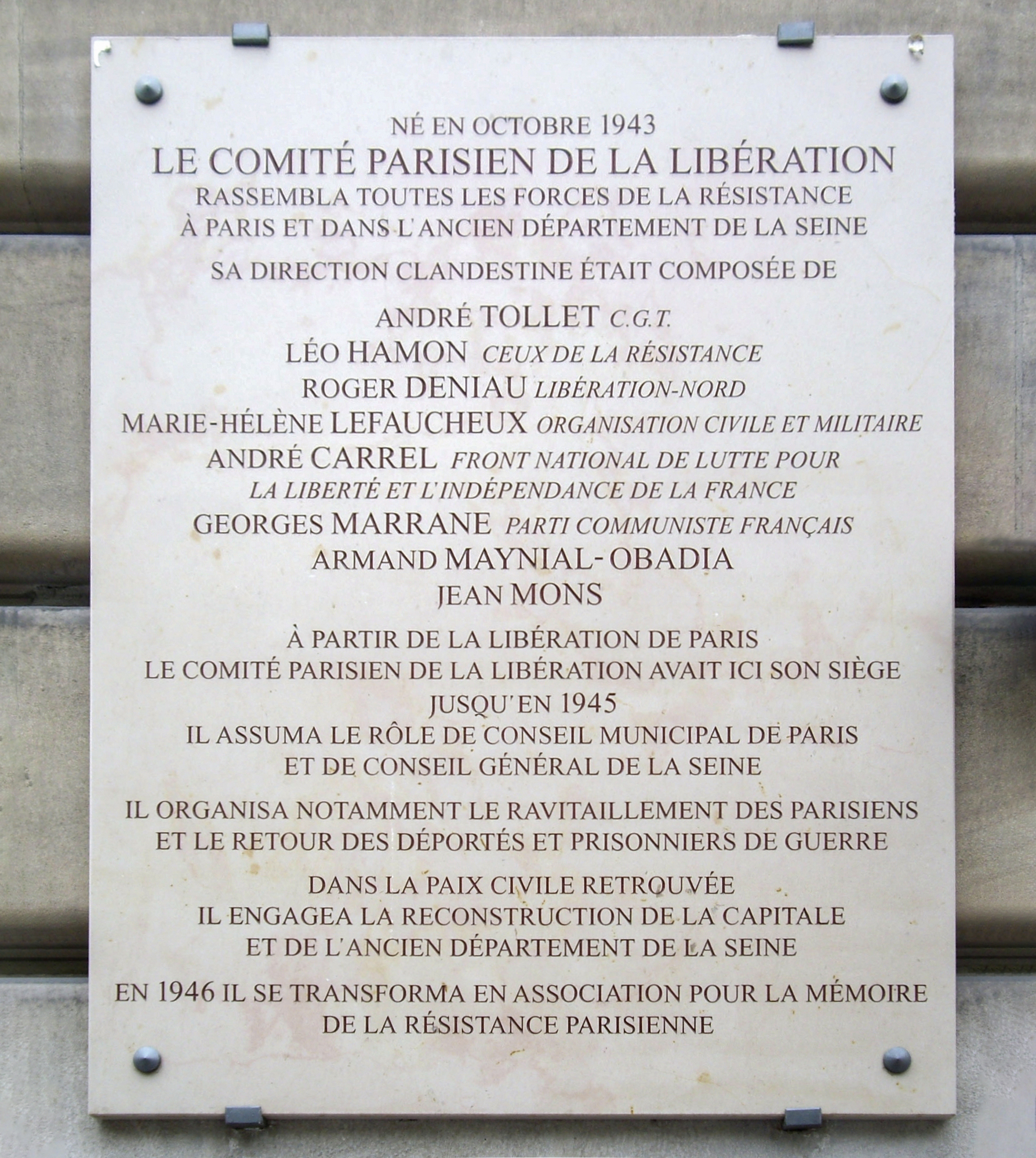
Plaque on the Paris Bourse du travail in memory of the Paris liberation committee

Tollet was appointed head of the PCF in Seine Inférieure, and took charge of communist union activities in the Seine department. He worked with Léon Jouhaux and Robert Bothereau to reunite the clandestine CGT, leading to the Perraux accords of May 1943. In October 1943 he was named chairman of the Paris liberation committee (Comité parisien de la Libération, CPL). After the Allied landings in June 1944, Tollet helped organize the public demonstrations in Paris, particularly that of 14 July 1944, and to organize the insurrectionist general strike. The 14 July 1944 strike had been ordered on 10 July 1944 by Charles Tillon, leader of the communist Francs-Tireurs et Partisans. Tollet demanded that the National Council of the Resistance (Conseil National de la Résistance, CNR) be the "official mouthpiece of the provisional government" rather than General Charles de Gaulle's appointees.

Tollet urged an immediate nationwide insurrection, while de Gaulle did not want to provide arms to civilians and opposed premature action. With the allied armies approaching Paris, Tollet managed to persuade the CPL to support insurrection on 18 August 1944. The French forces under de Gaulle entered Paris on 24 August 1944. The general did not go to the Hôtel de Ville, where Georges Bidault with the CNR and Tollet with the PCL were waiting for him. Instead he went first to the Ministry of War, where the center of government was established, and then to the Prefecture of Police, before finally visiting the Hôtel de Ville. After the liberation of Paris de Gaulle did not appoint Tollet head of the city council, as might have been expected given his position. Tollet was made a member of the Provisional Consultative Assembly in 1944, but played a minor role.

== Later career ==
Tollet worked for the CGT until 1951, when he left the confederal office and moved to the CGT Departmental Union of the Seine. In 1966 he moved to Prague to work at the headquarters of the World Federation of Trade Unions. He returned to France in 1970, where he retired from politics and trade union activity. He helped create the Museum of National Resistance. André Tollet died on 14 December 2001 in the 15th arrondissement of Paris. He was an Officer of the Legion of Honor.

== Publications ==
- André Tollet (1945). Criminels de Guerre!: derrière les coulisses : 50 potentats gouvernaient l'Allemagne. Edition "La vie ouvrière". p. 40.
- André Tollet (1969). La classe euvrière dans la résistance.
- André Tollet (1974). La souterrain. Éditions sociales. p. 165.
- André Tollet; Jean Claude Poitou (1984). 100 "V.O." clandestines, 1940-1944, parmi les 223 numéros parus. Les Editions de La Vie Guvriere. p. 240.
- André Tollet (1984). Marx-Engels et la troisième République (1871-1895): anthologie. Éditions sociales. p. 292. ISBN 978-2-209-05550-0.
- André Tollet; Claude Lecomte (2002). Ma traversée du siècle: André Tollet : mémoires d'un syndicaliste révolutionnaire. VO éditions. p. 112. ISBN 978-2-913462-18-2.

== Sources ==
- Dallas, Gregor (2006). 1945: The War That Never Ended. Yale University Press. ISBN 0-300-11988-7.
- Gildea, Robert (2014). "THE LAST SANS-CULOTTES AND THE LIBERATION OF PARIS". Archived from the original on 2015-10-08.
- Gildea, Robert (2015-09-01). Fighters in the Shadows: A New History of the French Resistance. Faber & Faber. ISBN 978-0-571-28035-3.
- Houssin, Monique (2004). Résistantes et résistants en Seine-Saint-Denis: un nom, une rue, une histoire. Editions de l'Atelier. ISBN 978-2-7082-3730-8.
- Maire de Paris (2013). "Attribution de la dénomination Esplanade André Tollet à la partie centrale de la place de la République" (in French).
- Virieux, Daniel (2004). "Esplanade André Tollet, Paris IIIe". La Résistance en Ile-de-France. AERI.
