= Arthur Dallidet =

French resistance member (1906–1942)

- Arthur Dallidet in 1939
- Born: 12 October 1906; Nantes, Loire-Inférieure, France
- Died: 30 May 1942 (aged 35); Fort Mont-Valérien, Paris, France
- Occupation: Metal worker
- Known for: French Resistance leader

Arthur Dallidet (12 October 1906 – 30 May 1942) was a French metal worker, Communist and trade union leader in the Renault factories, who became a leader of the French Resistance during World War II (1939–45).

Dallidet was born into a working-class family, left school early and worked as a fitter, moving from job to job. While in his twenties he began to organize trade union cells. He joined the French Communist Party and was noticed by the leaders, who sent him for education to Moscow and then assigned him to assist the Cadre Commission, which checked the loyalty of party members. Dallidet was an orthodox party member, and supported the Molotov–Ribbentrop Pact. After the start of World War II in September 1939 the Communist Party was banned. Dallidet went underground and played a leading role in organizing the clandestine structure of the party, which at this stage did not actively oppose the Germans in the "imperialist" war. The French Communists changed to active resistance after the German invasion of Russia in June 1941. Dallidet was placed in charge of security for the armed Resistance, the Francs-Tireurs et Partisans (FTP). He was arrested in February 1942, and despite severe beatings gave nothing away. He was executed by firing squad.

== Early years ==
Arthur Dallidet was born on 12 October 1906 in Nantes, Loire-Inférieure, son of a fitter who had worked for sixteen years at the Chantiers de la Loire shipyard in Nantes. His mother worked in a cannery in Saint-Sébastien-sur-Loire. Both parents supported the French Communist Party (PCF, Parti communiste français). Dallidet wrote in 1933 that "I was brought up to hate the curé, the flic and the army." (Note: A curé is a priest. Flic is a slang word for a policeman.) He left school in 1919, when he was thirteen. His headmaster found him a place as an apprentice designer with a company in Nantes, but he did not like office life and left in July 1921. He became an apprentice boilermaker at the Chantiers de la Loire, staying there until July 1924.

Dallidet worked at the Batignolles factory in Nantes from 1924 to 1926. He joined a cycling club, and was wounded in the leg and the face in a cycling accident. For this reason he was not required to perform military service. He moved to Paris in April 1928 and was hired by the Renault factory at Boulogne-Billancourt the next day, He was fired after less than two months after a fight. He worked for the next two years in a series of jobs with Citroën, Gallois in Meudon, Farman and again with Renault. None of these jobs lasted long. On 9 April 1929 he married a childhood sweetheart, Juliette Parisot. She died on 12 December 1929 five days after giving birth to a daughter, who was looked after by her sister in Nantes. Dallidet had to work hard to pay maintenance for his child. He later married again in 1933, to Enta Klugaite a Lithuanian communist and shorthand typist, it appears to have been also a marriage of convenience but they live together some years.

== Trade unionist and party worker ==
In July 1930 Dallidet joined the Sulzer company in Saint-Denis. During this period he became involved in militant activity after having managed to join the Jeunesses communistes (JC, Communist Youth) on his third application, and the French Communist Party on his second application in May 1932. In 1933 he became secretary of his cell at Sulzer, and of a union section with twenty members. He was involved with the Committee of Unemployed of the 18th arrondissement, spoke at assemblies of the unemployed and joined in hunger marches during the Leipzig trial. He began to submit articles to l'Humanité.

Due to his militancy Dallidet was fired from Sulzer on 8 June 1933. He found work with other companies, using a false name. On 9 February 1934 he marched in a procession of Renault workers, and climbed a lamppost to speak to them. He was arrested but released. He signed up as unemployed, ate at soup kitchens, and led the Communists in Renault from outside as a secretary of the local party section. He was placed in charge of the union paper l'Ile Seguin L'Ile du Diable, where he published a cartoon of Louis Renault that was a great success. He was a member of the Communist party's Regional Office in Paris West and of the council of the Unitary Federation of metalworkers. The party leadership assigned Dallidet to take courses at the Leninist School in Moscow, leaving in September 1935.

Dallidet returned to France in October 1936 and was given a permanent position in the PCF Cadre Commission as assistant to Maurice Tréand. The Cadre Commission (commission des cadres) was set up to "verify" comrades and ensure "that a thing was what it was supposed to be" – to root out informers and politically unreliable members. One technique was to require that all PCF members fill out an autobiographical questionnaire, which could then be analyzed. Maurice Tréand was appointed secretary early in 1933. The Cadre Commission was somewhat secretive, and worked directly with Maurice Thorez, Eugen Fried (Note: The Czechoslovak Eugen Fried was the Comintern "referent" who was given responsibility for overseeing the French Communist Party at the end of 1930.) and the Communist International's agencies. Dallidet was the second functionary to be assigned to the commission. Dallidet followed the party line and approved of the Molotov–Ribbentrop Pact in August 1939.

== World War II ==
=== Clandestine organization: September 1939 – June 1941 ===
World War II began when the German invasion of Poland was launched on 1 September 1939. The Soviet army invaded eastern Poland on 17 September. Dallidet visited Moscow in mid-September 1939. He met Georgi Dimitrov in Moscow on 16 September, and met André Marty and Dimitrov on 18 September. He went underground after the dissolution of the PCF on 26 September 1939, and worked with Benoît Frachon to establish the first clandestine structures, acting as secretary of the clandestine organization. Using the records he had preserved from before the war, he managed to reorganize the party despite arrests, mobilizations and the departure of militants who rejected the Soviet pact with the Nazis. Dallidet took the pseudonym "Emile". In November 1939 Pierre Georges put Paul Maertens (1907–63) in touch with Dallidet, who gave Maertens national responsibility for production and distribution of matériel.

After Germany invaded France and the defense collapsed, on 12 June 1940 Arthur Dallidet, Jeanjean, Georgette Cadras, Jeannette Tétard and Claudine Chomat left Paris for the south and met Benoit Frachon in Haute-Vienne. Dallidet based himself in Toulouse and bicycled around the area to renew his contacts. After the armistice of 22 June 1940 the PCF leaders denounced the imperialist war, called for peace and concentrated on opposition to the Vichy government. Frachon and Dallidet did not return to Paris until around 15 August 1940. (Note: Arthur's brother Raymond wrote that Arthur Dallidet returned to Paris on 3 August 1940.) Negotiations with the Germans had stalled and a directive of the Communist International had told them to cease, signed by Maurice Thorez but agreed by the French delegation of André Marty, Raymond Guyot and Arthur Ramette. Charles Tillon was called to the capital to join the clandestine PCF secretariat, where Dallidet was among his interviewers. Tillon became the third member of the secretariat, with Jacques Duclos and Benoît Frachon, and was put in charge of military matters.

The leadership of the French Communist Party during this period was divided between three locations. Secretary-general Thorez was in Moscow with Marty. In Paris the clandestine party was directed by Benoît Frachon, aided by Arthur Dallidet. In hiding in Brussels were Jacques Duclos, who became the political leader of the party, and later the leader of the Communist Resistance, Maurice Tréand and Eugen Fried. In mid-August 1940 Dallidet and Frachon decided not to use the safety devices and hideouts that Maurice Tréand had put in place, but to use a new network established by Dallidet. Tréand was allowed to continue setting up the clandestine structure in the northern zone, but received no further instructions. He was suspected to have been indiscreet due to trusting too much in the Soviet-German pact. Relations between Dallidet and his former boss Tréand were stormy after August 1940. In a report to Duclos dated 26 February 1941 Dallidet attacked Tréand, accusing him of "travail de groupe", an extreme offense in a Stalin-dominated party.

=== Active resistance: June 1941 – May 1942 ===
Germany attacked the Soviet Union on 22 June 1941 in Operation Barbarossa. With this, PCF policy switched to support for armed struggle against the German occupiers. On 2 August 1941 Albert Ouzoulias was put in charge of the Bataillons de la Jeunesse, fighting groups that were being created by the Jeunesses Communistes. Dallidet introduced Ouzoulias to Eugène Hénaff, who was responsible for the armed struggle under the direction of Tillon. About the time of the Barbès shooting (Note: The Barbès shooting was the assassination of a German soldier in the Barbès metro station on 21 August 1941 by Pierre Georges in revenge for the execution of the 20-year-old Samuel Tyszelman for having taken part in an anti-German demonstration.) in August 1941 the PCF Opérations Spéciales, the Bataillons de le Jeunesse and the Main-d'œuvre immigrée merged to form the Francs-Tireurs et Partisans (FTP) led by Pierre Villon. Although led by Communists, the FTP was under the National Front, which theoretically was independent of the PCF. The FTP's mandate was to sabotage railways and factories, punish collaborators and assassinate German soldiers. Dallidet was placed in charge of security.

Dallidet was recognized talking to a woman in a cafe beside the Reuilly metro station on the evening on 28 February 1942. He was arrested, taken to La Santé Prison, chained, handcuffed and severely beaten. He did not reveal any information, but had been carrying a long list of names and addresses. This led to other arrests including "Betty" (Madeleine Passot), his most important liaison officer. Further names and addresses were found in Betty's apartment. Dallidet suffered weeks of extreme torture, but continued to say nothing. His face became so badly bruised and swollen he could not open his eyes, and one arm was paralyzed. Dallidet was executed by a German firing squad on 30 May 1942 at Fort Mont-Valérien, Paris, along with Félix Cadras, Louis Salomon and Jacques Decour. The executions were a reprisal for an attempted assassination in Le Havre on 23 May 1942.
