= Félix Cadras =

French military personnel (1906–1942)

Félix Otto Cadras
- Born: 4 March 1906; Calais, Pas-de-Calais, France
- Died: 30 May 1942 (aged 36); Fort Mont-Valérien, Suresnes, Hauts-de-Seine, France
- Occupation: Lace designer
- Known for: Communist leader

Félix Otto Cadras (4 March 1906 – 30 May 1942) was a French lace designer and communist militant who became one of the leaders of the French Communist Party (PCF). During World War II (1939–45) he helped organize the communist underground during the occupation of France. He was arrested and executed by firing squad. After the war the communists presented him as a hero of the Resistance.

== Early years ==
Félix Otto Cadras was born on 4 March 1906 in Calais, Pas-de-Calais, where his family lived in the Pont-du-Leu district. He had one sister, Georgette. His father was an industrial designer with socialist views, who was killed in Champagne in October 1915 during World War I (1914–18). Félix Cadras was educated at the École Franklin on the Rue Van Grutten, then the EPS on the Place de la République. He left school at the age of fourteen. He enrolled in evening classes at the Calais École d’arts décoratifs, where he earned a diploma as a lace designer. He became an apprentice in 1919, and in 1923 obtained a job with Beaugrand, a small company. In 1924 he joined the newly created Communist Youth of Calais. In 1926 he was called up for military service, and was a quartermaster in the 40th artillery regiment at Châlons-sur-Marne. He was unemployed for six months after being discharged. He worked as an embroiderer and then designer for two companies in Calais from 1928 to 1933. He was again unemployed from 1933 to 1935. He married Georgette Becquet, a machine embroiderer, and they had a daughter in 1935. (Note: Félix Cadras's daughter, Mary Cadras, became a journalist who specialized in problems of childhood and adolescence and wrote for various women's magazines or magazines for teachers.)

== Pre-war militant ==
Cadras became an activist with the Communist Youth and took part in protests against the occupation of the Ruhr and the Moroccan War. He formally joined the French Communist Party (Parti communiste français, PCF) on 1 January 1932. He soon became the secretary of a party cell and of a section of the International Red Aid. Early in 1934 he became head of the Calais branch of the PCF, which had been steadily losing members. He organized demonstrations and tried to obtain support for the unemployed. He also read deeply, and in 1934 published a pamphlet entitled Union pour sauver Calais de la misère (Union to Save Calais from Misery) which brought him to the attention of the party leadership. He was appointed editor of Enchaîné, the communist newspaper in the departments of Pas-de-Calais and Nord, and became one of the PCF secretaries for this region.

Cadras became a member of the regional committee of Nord, and attended the national PCF conference in Ivry in June 1934. Charles Tillon and Marcel Gitton gave Cadras the job of organizing and agitating in Calais, Boulogne-sur-Mer and Dunkirk in the 1933–35 period. On 1 March 1935 he was appointed regional secretary for Nord. He was elected to the Calais municipal council in 1935. He was a member of the French delegation to the 7th Congress of the Communist International in Moscow in July–August 1935. He attended the PCE regional conference in Lille on 11–12 January 1936, where his speaking ability impressed Maurice Thorez. In May 1936 he ran in the national elections as deputy for the 2nd district of Boulogne-sur-Mer, but retired in favor of a socialist in the second round. He organized a departmental federation for the Pas-de-Calais, separate from the Nord federation, and was elected secretary of this federation on 28 June 1936. He led strikes in the pulp and paper mills and the spinning mills in 1936.

Cadras was a member of the departmental committee of the Popular Front, and was a delegate to the congress of Villeurbanne. After the 7th Comintern Congress he made three study visits to the Soviet Union during the inter-war period. From February to August 1937 he studied at the PCE "Worker's University" in Arcueil, Val-de-Marne. At the Arles congress in December 1937 he was appointed an alternate member of the Central Committee. Soon after he was called to Paris by Maurice Thorez, with whom he became a close friend. He was placed in charge of the Organization Department of the Central Committee, and became a member of the Cadres Committee and the Political Control Committee.

== World War II ==
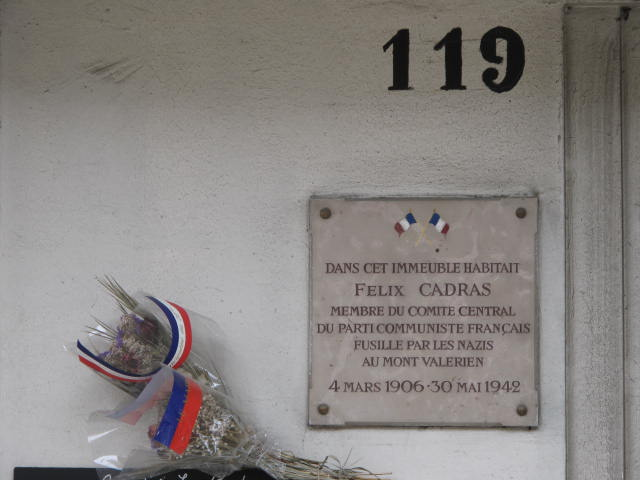
Plaque in memory of Félix Cadras at 119 Boulevard Davout, Paris 20th arr, where he lived under a false name during World War II

With the outbreak of World War II (1939–45) Cadras was mobilized on 4 September 1939 as an artillery sergeant and assigned to the garrison of Boulogne-sur-Mer, where he remained until the German invasion in May 1940. In June 1940 his unit, which had retreated to Les Sables-d'Olonne, surrendered. Cadras avoided being taken prisoner and made his way to Tours and then to Toulouse, where he was demobilized. His sister Georgette (Note: Georgette Cadras was sentenced to ten years hard labor in Ravensbrück concentration camp. She survived and returned to France. Mary Cadras, Félix Cadras's daughter, went to meet her at the Gare de l'Est. She did not recognize Georgette among the group of emaciated women in striped suits that got off the train.) found him there and told him the underground leadership of the PCE wanted him to help organize the resistance in the southern zone.

Early in 1941 he was called to Paris to work with Jacques Duclos and Benoît Frachon. He was given the job of coordinating between regional groups and establishing printing operations, stores and distribution networks. He organized the first street demonstrations in Paris and the miner's strike in Nord-Pas-de-Calais. Cadras attended the meetings that led to the National Front being established. He provided material needed by the Resistance units that became the Francs-Tireurs et Partisans (FTP).

A failure in security revealed the identities of Cadras and Arthur Dallidet, a member of the PCE leadership staff. Cadras was arrested on 15 February 1942 by a special police brigade. He was arrested outside his house, and shouted a warning to his wife, who was inside. The police broke in and found her throwing a bag of documents through the window, which turned out to describe Resistance efforts throughout France. After interrogation, he was passed on to the Gestapo for further questioning. Cadras was tortured by the Germans. He was tried and sentenced to death, and imprisoned in La Santé Prison.

Cadras was executed by a German firing squad on 30 May 1942 at Fort Mont-Valérien, Paris, along with Arthur Dallidet, Louis Salomon and Jacques Decour. The executions were a reprisal for an attempted assassination in Le Havre on 23 May 1942. Cadras was said to have been singing La Marseillaise when he was shot. After the war Cadras was presented as a martyr by the Communist Party, an ideal of a young working-class militant. He was made a Chevalier of the Legion of Honor by a decree of 17 January 1961. A school in Calais is named after him, and a street in Calais-Nord.

== Sources ==
- Besse, Jean-Pierre; Pouty, Thomas (2006). Les fusillés: répression et exécutions pendant l'occupation, 1940-1944. Editions de l'Atelier. ISBN 978-2-7082-3869-5.
- Fauquet, Georges (2010-06-30). "Félix Cadras" (in French). Anonymes, Justes et Persécutés durant la période Nazie.
- Firsov, Fridrikh Igorevich; Klehr, Harvey; Haynes, John Earl (2014-05-27). Secret Cables of the Comintern, 1933-1943. Yale University Press. ISBN 978-0-300-19822-5.
- Le Maner, Yves (2013). "CADRAS Félix, Otto" (PDF).
- "Mary Cadras" (in French). A.D.I.R.P. de Paris.
- Mazuy, Rachel (2002-06-01). Croire plutôt que voir ?: Voyages en Russie soviétique (1919-1939). Odile Jacob. ISBN 978-2-7381-1153-1.
- Michine, Irène; Vittori, Jean-Pierre (2005). Le grand livre des témoins. Editions de l'Atelier. ISBN 978-2-7082-3799-5.
- Moorehead, Caroline (2011-11-01). A Train in Winter: An Extraordinary Story of Women, Friendship and Survival in World War Two. Random House of Canada. ISBN 978-0-307-36667-2.
- Whitney, Susan (2009-08-21). Mobilizing Youth: Communists and Catholics in Interwar France. Duke University Press. ISBN 978-0-8223-9156-2.
