= Benoît Frachon =

Former leader of the French Communist Party

- Born: 13 May 1893; Le Chambon-Feugerolles, Loire, France
- Died: 1 August 1975 (aged 82); Les Bordes, Loiret, France
- Occupations: Metalworker, trade union leader
- Known for: CGT Secretary-General

Benoît Frachon (French pronunciation: [bənwa fʁaʃɔ̃]; 13 May 1893 – 1 August 1975), a French metalworker and trade union leader, was one of the leaders of the French Communist Party (Parti communiste français, PCF) and of the French Resistance during World War II (1939–45). He was Secretary-General of the Confédération générale du travail (CGT) from 1945 to 1967.

== Early years ==
Benoît Frachon was born on 13 May 1893 in Le Chambon-Feugerolles, Loire, the third of five children in a working-class family. Le Chambon-Feugerolles was a mining and industrial town in the Loire coal basin. His father was a miner who died of uremia at the age of 51. Benoît received a Certificate of Primary Education in July 1904. He went on to secondary school in Chambon-Feugerolles, but dropped out two years later. At the age of thirteen he became apprenticed to a former metal worker, who taught him the basic skills.

When Frachon's father died he obtained work with a manufacturer of bolts and other hardware. He joined the union in 1909. He joined a strike at his factory in January 1910 that soon spread to all the metal works in the Loire. He lost his job due to another strike in 1911, but soon found work in a machine factory. He joined a small anarchist group of miners and metalworkers created in 1909, and read Gustave Hervé's weekly La Guerre Sociale and Pierre Monatte's La Vie Ouvrière. He often visited the Maison du Peuple in Chambon, where he participated in theatrical productions and read widely in the library. Frachon joined the general strike in 1912 against the "Three Years Law". In 1913 he was called up for military service. He was placed in the auxiliary service due to his myopia, and was in the clothing store of the 30th Artillery Regiment in Orléans at the outbreak of World War I (1914–18).

== World War I ==
Frachon was returned to active duty in the Guérigny naval arsenal, but due to his technical skills was not sent to the front. Frachon disagreed with the CGT position of supporting the Union sacrée, under which no industrial actions were taken during the struggle with Germany, and preferred Alphonse Merrheim's opposition to contributing to the war effort. He was a strong supporter of the October Revolution in Russia in 1917. Frachon was elected when Albert Thomas, the socialist Minister of Armaments, created worker's delegates. In January 1918 he was an alternate delegate for his workshop, and took a clear position against the war. He was moved from Guérigny that month and given various jobs in the aviation industry. He was at Belfort when the armistice was declared in November 1918. He spent a short time with the troops occupying the Rhineland, then was discharged on 19 August 1919.

== 1919–28: Regional leader ==
Frachon returned to Chambon-Feugerolles on 8 September 1919, where he joined the socialist Section Française de l'Internationale Ouvrière (SFIO). He could not find work in the region, so moved to Marseille where he found a job as a metallurgist at the Giraud-Soulay company. He was soon elected a shop steward, and negotiated with the management in two disputes. During this period he abandoned his anarcho-syndicalist views. After the split of the SFIO at the Tours Congress of 25–30 December 1920 he became a member of the local branch of the French Communist Party. He led his whole section into the Communist Party. In June 1921 Frachon returned to Chambon where he found work with the Société anonyme des aciéries et forges de Firminy. He quit this job after refusing to work on making torpedoes. He was rehired and again fired several times, helped by his qualification but still refusing to make weapons.

In 1922 Frachon became secretary of the metal workers union in Chambon. In this role he participated in the founding congress of the Confédération générale du travail unitaire (CGTU) on 26 June – 1 July 1922 in Saint-Étienne. He supported the union joining the Communist International. He ran successfully in the 1922 municipal elections and became deputy mayor of Chambon, but did not find municipal politics interesting and resigned from this office on 25 August 1922. In March–April 1924 he was among the CGTU Communist activists who led a major strike of 20,000 metalworkers in the Foréz region. He was arrested for undermining the freedom of labor, sentenced to four months in prison and fined 200 francs. The strike did much to advance the position of the Communists in the CGTU against the anarcho-syndicalist leadership. In November 1924 Frachon was appointed permanent secretary to the Loire departmental union of the Confédération générale du travail unitaire (CGTU). In March 1925 he organized a conference of all the Loire unions, against the opposition of the CGTU leaders.

Frachon was elected head of Communist cells in the Lyon region (Rhône-Alpes). In 1925 he became secretary of the PCF trade union committee covering the departments of the Rhône, Loire, Saône-et-Loire, Haute-Loire, Ain, Jura, Ardèche, and part of Isère. On 25 April 1925 Frachon married Marie-Louise Péalat, a seamstress from Chambon. Their son, Henri, was born on 7 January 1929. As secretary of the departmental union of the CGTU he was a member of the French delegation to the sixth session of the Executive Committee of the Communist International in Moscow in February–March 1926. On his return he replaced the secretary of the Lyon region of the PCF. At the PCF's Lille Congress in July 1926 he became a member of the Central Committee. He was very active in promoting the party in meetings throughout the region, fighting Trotskyist influences and praising the example of the Soviet Union. Frachon ran unsuccessfully in the national elections in April 1928 as candidate of the Workers and Peasants Bloc for the 3rd district of Lyon.

== National leader ==
Frachon attended the PCE national conference in June 1928, where he was designated delegate to the 6th congress of the Communist International in July–September 1928. He returned as an alternate member of the Executive Committee. In November 1928 Maurice Thorez proposed him as a member of the Politburo of the PCE Central Committee. At the end of 1928 Frachon moved permanently from Lyon to Paris. He was made a member of the secretariat established at the 1928 congress, along with Henri Barbé, Pierre Célor and Thorez. Frachon and other PCF leaders were arrested on 24 July 1929 at a meeting held in Villeneuve-Saint-Georges to prepare for the international anti-war demonstrations of 1 August. They were charged with conspiracy against the internal and external security of the state. Frachon was jailed in La Santé Prison, where he wrote several articles under a pseudonym for L'Humanité and La Vie Ouvrière.

Frachon and the others were released on bail in May 1930. Frachon moved to an apartment on the first floor of a house in Choisy-le-Roi, where he was joined by his wife and son. He rejoined the politburo in January 1931. He was involved in the dispute against Barbé and Celor, accused of sectarianism. He often wrote for L'Humanité, Les Cahiers du bolchevisme and La Vie ouvrière, advancing the need for a united front of exploited workers, and for workers to understand the broader issues when often they were focused on immediate goals such as better wages and improved working conditions. In the early 1930s the PCF was in disarray. Eugen Fried was assigned by Comintern to eliminate the social-democratic and anarcho-syndicalist elements, and prevent the Trotskyists from gaining influence. He was to resolve rivalry, eliminate unsound elements and install men loyal to Moscow at the head of the party. Fried removed Barbé and Célor and advanced Thorez, Frachon, Jacques Duclos and André Marty.

In November 1931 Frachon was named a member of the CGTU's Confederal Bureau. In October 1932 he left the PCE secretariat and became secretary of the CGTU, replacing Monmousseau. From 29 June to 29 August 1933 the building workers of Strasbourg went on strike, and the strike spread to enterprises elsewhere in Alsace and Moselle. Frachon and Eugène Hénaff, the national representatives, provided assistance to the local militants Auguste Walch, Frédéric Fassnacht, Joseph Mohn and Georges Woldi. The October 1934 meeting of the National Confederal Committee of the CGTU was entirely devoted to trade union unity. Frachon became secretary of the reunited Confédération générale du travail (CGT) at the trade union unification congress in Toulouse in March 1936. On 9 March 1936 he resigned from the PCE politburo, although he remained one of the party leaders. Unlike Thorez, he opposed participation of the communists in the Popular Front government. He participated in the Matignon negotiations in June 1936, which achieved important advances in worker's rights.

At the start of 1937 the Frachons moved to an apartment in Montreuil, where they lived until the start of 1939, then moved to a small house with a garden in Montreuil, made available by the communist party, beside the house of Jacques Duclos. He worked for international trade union unity, but without success. In November 1937 he and Jouhaux went to Moscow to discuss unity with the Russian unions. In 1938 he and Jouhaux attended a convention of Mexican unions. On his way back, in Washington, D.C. he gave an interview to United Press in which he denounced concessions made to fascism during the crisis over German demands of Czechoslovakia. At the CGT conference after the Munich Agreement he supported Jouhaux in his personal disapproval of the agreements but said trade union unity was the more important issue. The Molotov–Ribbentrop Pact between the Soviet Union and Germany on the eve of World War II (1939–45) caused a surge of anti-communist feeling. Although Frachon called for the independence of the CGT from all parties, and for the unity of trade unions of all countries, he was removed from his position in the confederal office of the CGT in September 1939.

== World War II ==
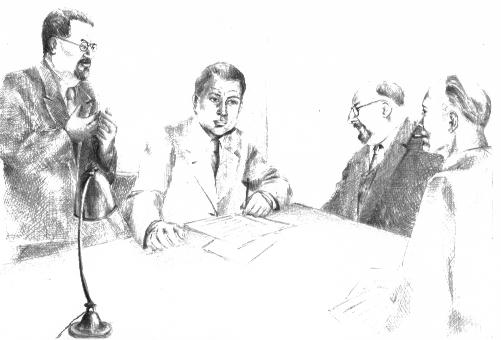
Clandestine PCF secretariat in 1943. Left to right: Frachon, Auguste Lecoeur, Jacques Duclos and Charles Tillon

World War II (1939–45) began when the German invasion of Poland was launched on 1 September 1939. The Soviet army invaded eastern Poland on 17 September. The PCE was officially dissolved on 26 September 1939. The communist leadership at first accepted the Comintern line that the war was a fight between imperialists, not relevant to the workers. Frachon would spend most of the war in the Paris region. On 8 October 1939 he was designated PCF secretary for French territory at a leadership meeting in Belgium which he did not attend for fear of being detained at the border. During the Phoney War that ensued, Frachon helped relaunch the communist journals, now published illegally. Arthur Dallidet worked with Frachon to establish the first clandestine structures, acting as secretary of the clandestine organization.

After the German invasion of May 1940, Frachon followed the official line of investigating the conditions for national defense. He tried to make contact with the government to gain the release of communists to help in resisting the invasion, but was not answered. Frachon, Arthur Dallidet, Jean Catelas, Gabriel Péri and Georges Politzer met in Paris early in June 1940, and decided to send Frachon and Dallidet to the Limousin region to start reorganizing communist activity. Frachon left Paris on 12 June 1940, and moved to the Haute-Vienne. He and Dallidet rebuilt links with Bordeaux, Clermont-Ferrand and Toulouse. Arthur Dallidet, Jeanjean, Georgette Cadras, Jeannette Tétard and Claudine Chomat left Paris for the south at the same time, and met Frachon in Haute-Vienne.

After the armistice of 22 June 1940 the PCF leaders denounced the imperialist war, called for peace and concentrated on opposition to the Vichy government. Tréand and Jean Catelas, the deputy for Amiens, began negotiations with the German ambassador for permission to resume open publication of the communist journal l'Humanité. The negotiations fell through, and the Soviet Union changed tack and condemned the attempt. The leadership of the French Communist Party in the period between the German occupation of France between the armistice and the German invasion of Russia on 22 June 1941 was divided between three locations. Secretary-general Maurice Thorez was in Moscow with André Marty. In Paris the clandestine party was directed by Frachon, aided by Arthur Dallidet. In hiding in Brussels were Jacques Duclos, who became the political leader of the party, and later the leader of the Communist Resistance, Maurice Tréand and Eugen Fried. Charles Tillon took a different line from the other PCF leaders. Instead, in public statements in June and July 1940 Tillon spoke out for fighting for national liberation from the Germans.

Frachon returned to Paris and met Duclos on 10 August 1940. The two men assumed leadership of the party in France. They decided not to use the safety devices and hideouts that Maurice Tréand had put in place, but to use a new network established by Dallidet. Tréand was suspected to have been indiscreet due to trusting too much in the Soviet-German pact. In the autumn Frachon and Duclos decided to appoint Charles Tillon to organize the first armed groups of the PCF. Frachon met Tillon in early November 1940 to propose this assignment. Tillon accepted and became the third member of the secretariat. Germany attacked the Soviet Union on 22 June 1941 in Operation Barbarossa. With this, PCF policy switched to support for armed struggle against the German occupiers. Tillon was put in charge of military matters. Jacques Duclos became effective leader of the party, although in theory Tillon and Frachon shared authority.

Frachon's primary concern during the war was the trade union movement. Through many articles in the underground journals he explained the failings of the Vichy Government, and called for the workers to organize clandestine sections within the legal unions to oppose Vichy and the German occupiers. He contacted Louis Saillant in the autumn of 1940, who was also hostile to the draft Charte du Travail and to collaboration with the enemy. They arranged a meeting between the confederate and unitarian groups of the CGT on 17 May 1941. Contact was broken during the repressive period that followed, but resumed in July 1942. Frachon proposed to Léon Jouhaux a joint appeal to the working class, calling on them to demand their union rights, refuse the Charte du Travail and forced labor in Germany, urge them to join the armed struggle and announce the reunification of the CGT. Jouhaux did not want to go underground, and the meeting broke up.

Fresh contacts finally led to the Perreux reunification agreements in April 1943. Until the Liberation of France in 1944 most of the trade union action was taken by the unitarians led by Frachon. It was at his proposal that it was agreed that the CGT should have two general secretaries. The two were Frachon and Louis Saillant, who got on well together. Saillant replaced Jouhaux, who had been deported to Germany. Dominique Labbé served as for several years Frachon's unofficial secretary. He records Frachon’s rather casual attitude towards official titles and hierarchy at this time.

== Post-liberation ==
In the last months of the German occupation, Duclos and Frachon met frequently and helped prepare the uprising. On 22 August 1944 Frachon signed an article in L'Humanité that called on the metalworkers of Paris to take arms. Soon after, Frachon and Duclos returned to the PCF headquarters, and then to their homes in Montreuil. On 27 August 1944 Frachon made his base in the Confederal Bureau of the CGT headquarters on rue Lafayette. He laid out the task of CGT union officials: to bring the war to a successful end, rebuild the economy and resume the fight for worker's rights. Frachon was a member of the Provisional Consultative Assembly from 1944 to 1945.

In 1945, he attended the World Trade Union Conference in London alongside many renowned trade unionists.

The CGT "diarchy" of Jouhaux and Frachon was formalized on 5 September 1945 and confirmed in the April 1946 CGT conference. Frachon was Joint Secretary-General of the CGT from 1945 to 1967. He had to deal with the PTT strike in the summer of 1946, the Renault strike at the end of April 1947 and further strikes in late 1947. During the repression that began in 1953, Frachon escaped arrest on 23 March 1953 by going into hiding. He continued to make regular contributions to L'Humanité and other journals. His report to the 29th congress in June 1953 was read by Monmousseau. In November 1953 Frachon participated in the Congress of Trade Unions of the Seine. He was arrested that evening but was freed a few days later.

Frachon became the sole secretary general in 1957, after Alain Le Léap retired as joint secretary general of the CGT, an arrangement confirmed at the 1959 CGT confederal congress. At the 36th congress of the CGT in June 1967 he handed over to Georges Seguy, since his health was failing. He moved to Les Bordes, Loiret, in the spring of 1973. In October 1973 he suffered a cardiovascular and cerebral accident. He died in Bordes on 4 August 1975 at the age of 82.

== Publications ==
- Thorez, Maurice; Frachon, Benoît (1931). Parti communiste [S.F.I.C.] Discours ... Secrétaire du Parti Communiste. p. 64.
- Thorez, Maurice; Frachon, Benoît (1931). Le Communisme vit ! il vaincra ! Programme et tactique du parti communiste. Bureau d'éditions, 132, faubourg Saint-Denis. p. 52.
- Frachon, Benoît; Monmousseau, Gaston (1934). Pour une C.G.T. unique ! Pour l'action de masse ! Discours prononcés à la Conférence nationale du parti communiste, Ivry, juin 1934. Impr. d'art Voltaire, 34, rue Richer; les Publications révolutionnaires, 120, rue Lafayette.
- Frachon, Benoît (1935). Le grand capitalisme provocateur de crise, de désordre et de misère: rapport présenté ... au 8è congrès de la CGTU, Issy-Les-Moulineaux, 24-27 septembre 1935. Editions de la CGTU. p. 49.
- Frachon, Benoît (1937). Lettre ouverte à mon frère du syndicat "professionnel. impr. J.E.P. p. 27.
- Frachon, Benoît (1938). De Toulouse à Nantes. Deux ans d'activité confédérale au service de la classe ouvrière. Conférence faite [...] le 7 juillet 1938. Union syndicale de la Métallurgie parisienne. p. 32.
- Frachon, Benoît (1939). Unité ouvrière internationale pour la défense de la paix et de la liberté: Discours prononcés aux Assemblées de la Fédération syndicale internationale... Suivis de documents sur la discussion entre les syndicats soviétiques et la F. S. I... Editions "Vie ouvrière. p. 32.
- Frachon, Benoît (1945). La C.G.T. et la renaissance française. Rapport présenté au Comité Confédéral National de la C.G.T. du 4 au 6 Septembre 1945. Impr. spéciale de l'Union des syndicats. p. 24.
- Frachon, Benoît (1946). La Bataille de la production: Nouvelle étape du combat contre les trusts. Rapports, articles et discours. Ed. sociales. p. 239.
- Frachon, Benoît (1948). Rapport au XXVIIe congrès de la Confédération générale du travail. p. 32.
- Frachon, Benoît (1958). La classe ouvrière dans la lutte pour la démocratie et la République, pour la défense des libertés syndicales et les revendications, pour la paix: discours au C.C.N. des 11 et 12 juin 1958. Confédération Générale du Travail. p. 31.
- Frachon, Benoît (1963). Union de la classe ouvrière et des démocrates: pour de meilleurs salaires, la réduction du temps de travail, la défense des libertés et de la paix. "Le Peuple. p. 46.
- Frachon, Benoît (1963). Sur le chemin de l'unité syndicale: recueil d'articles et d'interventions. C.G.T. p. 95.
- Frachon, Benoît (1967). L'Épopée d'un peuple maître de son destin: l'ascension de l'Union soviétique et ses causes. Éditions du Pavillon. p. 138.
- Frachon, Benoît (1967). Les Cheminots dans l'histoire sociale de la France. Ed. sociales. p. 319.
- Frachon, Benoît (1973). Au rythme des jours: rétrospective sur 20 années de luttes de la C.G.T (textes choisis). 1955-1967. Ed. sociales. p. 638.
- Frachon, Benoît (1981). Pour la CGT: mémoires de lutte, 1902-1939. Éditions sociales. p. 261. ISBN 978-2-209-05452-7.
- Frachon, Benoît (1993). Ecrits sur la CGT. VO éd. p. 91. ISBN 978-2-902323-33-3.
- Frachon, Benoît. Les Grèves de Strasbourg, une phase de la lutte des Alsaciens-Lorrains contre l'impérialisme français. Internationale syndicale rouge, Confédération générale du travail unitaire. p. 64.
