= Jean Catelas =

French politician

Jean Joseph Catelas
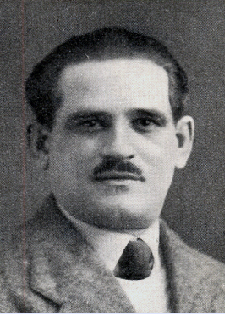
- Born: 6 May 1894; Puisieux, Pas-de-Calais, France
- Died: 24 September 1941 (aged 47); Paris, France
- Cause of death: Execution by guillotine
- Occupations: Railway worker, politician
- Known for: Deputy for Amiens

Jean Joseph Catelas (6 May 1894 – 24 September 1941) was a French communist politician who was a deputy for the Somme from 1936 to 1940. He was arrested by the Vichy government during World War II (1939–1945), sentenced to death for his underground activities and executed.

== Early years ==
Jean Joseph Catelas was born on 6 May 1894 in Puisieux, Pas-de-Calais, the seventh of nine children in a poor family. He obtained his school certificate when he was aged 12, and became a worker in hosiery, working in this occupation until 1914. With the outbreak of World War I (1914–18) he was assigned to the infantry. Catalas spent most of the war at the front, and took part in the Battle of Verdun. He earned several citations and the Military Medal. He took part in the great strike of 1920.

After being demobilized Catelas joined the French Northern Railway (Compagnie des chemins de fer du Nord) as a brakeman. He joined the French Communist Party (Parti communiste français, PCF) after the Tours Congress of 25–30 December 1920. From 1922 to 1932 he was secretary to the Confédération générale du travail unitaire (CGTU) railway workers' union. In 1924 he became a train conductor.

== Politician ==
In the general elections of 1/8 May 1932 Catelas was the PCF candidate for the first district of Amiens, but was not successful. In 1935 he was elected to the municipal council of Longueau. He ran again for the first district of Amiens in the elections of April/May 1936 and this time was elected. He was a member in turn of committees on hygiene, public health, customs, and commerce and industry. In December 1937 he was appointed to the PCF Central Committee at the Congress of Arles.

Catelas was an active supporter of the Republican side during the Spanish Civil War (1936–39) and made frequent visits to Spain to see how they could be helped. On 14 July 1938 he joined the French volunteers in the brigade called "La Marseillaise" in preparation for an attack in the Battle of the Ebro that was launched eleven days later. He was one of the last of the communists to leave Spain, in the company of Dolores Ibárruri ("La Pasionaria").

== World War II ==
After the outbreak of World War II (1939–45) Catelas remained a PCF member, and under the law of 20 January 1940 lost his seat in the Chamber of Deputies. Catelas, Benoît Frachon, Arthur Dallidet, Gabriel Péri and Georges Politzer met in Paris early in June 1940, and decided to send Frachon and Dallidet to the Limousin region to start reorganizing communist activity. After the armistice of 22 June 1940 the PCF leaders denounced the imperialist war, called for peace and concentrated on opposition to the Vichy government. Catelas and Maurice Tréand began negotiations with the German ambassador for permission to resume open publication of the communist journal l'Humanité. Tréand and Catelas met with Otto Abetz on 26 June 1940 to discuss the arrangement, and followed up with a letter spelling out their request. They promised that l'Humanité would "pursue a policy of European pacification" and would "denounce the activities of the agents of British imperialism." The negotiations fell through, and the Soviet Union changed tack and condemned the attempt.

A confidential police report on a clandestine meeting of communist militants on 24 July 1940 gave the attendees as Catelas, Eugène Hénaff and others. Catelas opened by saying the purpose was to lay the foundations of a "new unionism", which would be based on popular committees in factories. Militants should be extremely careful to avoid stimulating repressive counter moves. He obtained full agreement from the attendees. Catelas was arrested in Asnières on 13 May 1941. He was condemned by the Tribunal d'Etat (State Tribunal) of the Vichy government in a session of 20–21 September 1941, along with J. Woog and A. Guyot. He was guillotined in the courtyard of La Santé Prison on 24 September 1941, aged 47. The execution took place at the demand of the Germans in retaliation for an act of resistance by Pierre Georges ("Colonel Fabien"). The Catelas dossier at the Tribunal d'Etat is empty.

== Sources ==
- Adereth, Maxwell (1984-01-01). The French Communist Party: A Critical History (1920-1984), from Comintern to "the Colours of France". Manchester University Press. ISBN 978-0-7190-1083-5.
- "Charles, Joseph TILLON". Base de données des députés français depuis 1789. French National Assembly.
- Dartigolles, Olivier (2007-09-23). "Hommage à Jean Catelas" (in French). Amiens: PCF. Archived from the original on March 20, 2012.
- Dauvergne, Christophe (2015). "Quand le PCF collaborait avec Hitler" (in French). Archived from the original on 2015-07-08.
- Houssin, Monique (2004). Résistantes et résistants en Seine-Saint-Denis: un nom, une rue, une histoire. Editions de l'Atelier. ISBN 978-2-7082-3730-8.
- Jackson, Julian (2001-04-26). France: The Dark Years, 1940-1944. OUP Oxford. ISBN 978-0-19-162288-5.
- Jolly, Jean (1977). "Jean, Joseph CATELAS". Dictionnaire des parlementaires français de 1889 à 1940 (in French).
- Maury, Nicolas (30 August 2013). "Benoit Frachon l'incontournable". Le Grand Soir (in French).
- Tasca, Angelo (1986). Vichy 1940-1944: quaderni e documenti inediti di Angelo Tasca. Feltrinelli Editore. ISBN 978-88-07-99044-1.
