= Eugen Fried =

Czechoslovak communist (1900–1943)

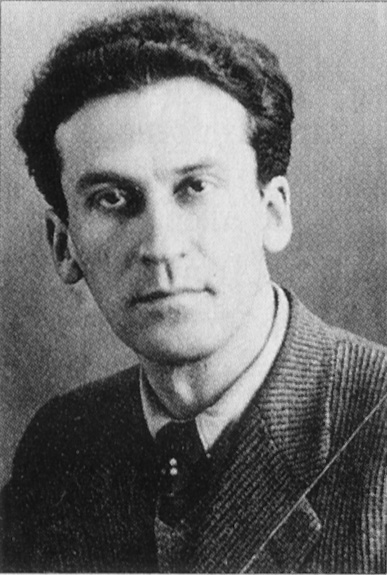
- Born: 13 March 1900; Trnava, Austria-Hungary
- Died: 17 August 1943 (aged 43); Brussels, Belgium
- Other name: "Clément"
- Occupation: Communist leader
- Known for: PCF leadership

Eugen Fried (13 March 1900 – 17 August 1943) was a Czechoslovak communist who played a leading role in the French Communist Party in the 1930s and early 1940s as the representative of the Communist International. He ensured that the party leaders were loyal to Joseph Stalin and followed the instructions of Moscow. He was ruthless but discreet, and stayed out of the public eye.

== Life ==
=== 1900–21: Early years ===
Eugen (Jenő) Fried was born on 13 March 1900 in Trnava, in what is now eastern Slovakia, to a family of Jewish small traders. He was a gifted student, and graduated from secondary school in 1917. He started to study chemistry at the University of Budapest but was unable to graduate due to the collapse of Austria-Hungary in 1918. He joined the Bolsheviks and from March to July 1919 participated in the revolution of Béla Kun that established the Hungarian Soviet Republic. When the republic collapsed he took refuge in the new country of Czechoslovakia.

=== 1921–29: Communist Party of Czechoslovakia ===
Fried joined the Communist Party of Czechoslovakia (KSČ, Komunistická strana Československa) when it was founded in 1921. He was assigned to Košice, capital of eastern Slovakia, where he was an activist until 1924. In 1924 he made an illegal visit to Moscow to attend the fifth Congress of the Communist International (Comintern). He was arrested some time after returning and sentenced to thirty months in prison. He was imprisoned from 1925 to 1927. In 1927 he married a young Slovak activist. Fried was a cultured and well-read man with wide interests who spoke several languages. He was elegant, well-dressed, courteous, soft-spoken and ruthless.

After his release Fried was assigned to Liberec in Bohemia, in the west of the country, since he was too well known in Slovakia . He had become a professional revolutionary and an admirer of Stalin. Dmitry Manuilsky, one of Stalin's representatives in the Comintern, noticed Fried and gave him increasingly responsible tasks. By June 1928 Fried was responsible for purging the KSČ of leaders who were not sufficiently obedient to Moscow. In December 1928 he was assigned to the KSČ Secretariat and given the task of imposing a leadership loyal to Stalin. He left his wife in 1929 when Dmitry Manuilsky called him to join the Comintern in Moscow. (Note: Fried had a relationship in France with Ana Pauker, a Romanian communist leader. They had a daughter who was born in Moscow, then brought back to France and raised by the parents of Aurore Memboeuf, Thorez's first wife. Aurore divorced Thorez in 1934 and started to live with Fried. They raised Fried's daughter and Aurore's son by Thorez.) He was accused of leftism by the Comintern in December 1929 but was restored to favor after writing a self-criticism.

=== 1930–39: Pre-war French Communist Party ===
Fried was appointed Comintern "referent", responsible for overseeing the French Communist Party (PCF, Parti communiste français), at the end of 1930. He took the pseudonym of "Clément". From 1931 to 1942 Fried played a leading role in the PCF. At this time the PCF was in disarray. Fried's instructions were to eliminate the social-democratic and anarcho-syndicalist elements, and prevent the Trotskyists from gaining influence. He was to resolve rivalry, eliminate unsound elements and install men loyal to Moscow at the head of the party. Fried, a charming and persuasive man, achieved these goals within a few years. He removed Henri Barbé and Pierre Célor and advanced Maurice Thorez, Jacques Duclos, Benoît Frachon and André Marty. After making Thorez the official party leader, Fried stayed out of the limelight but was the true leader of the PCF. Thorez and Fried both attended the Anti-Fascist Workers' Congress and the 7th World Congress of the Comintern, but Thorez was the public face of the party.

The Cadre Commission (commission des cadres) was set up to "verify" comrades and ensure "that a thing was what it was supposed to be" – to root out informers and politically unreliable members. One technique was to require that all PCF members fill out an autobiographical questionnaire, which could then be analyzed. Early in 1933 Maurice Tréand was made secretary of the PCF's Cadre Commission. The Cadre Commission was somewhat secretive, and worked directly with Fried, Thorez and the Comintern's agencies. In 1934 Fried removed Jacques Doriot, whom the Soviet Union thought had been too hasty in denouncing the growing Nazi threat in Germany. However, within a year the PCF was supporting the Comintern's Popular front program. After the 1936 French elections Fried directed the PCF to support the government of Léon Blum without participating in it. He downplayed the Stalinist purges of the late 1930s, and explained the Molotov–Ribbentrop Pact between Germany and the Soviet Union to the party leaders.

=== 1939–43: World War II ===
World War II (1939–45) broke out at the start of September 1939. The Executive Committee of the Communist International communicated to the French and British communists parties through Fried explaining that the war was not one of democracy versus fascism, but was a war between imperialist powers, and "... the primary issue is the struggle against capitalism—the source of all wars—against the regime of bourgeois dictatorship in all its forms, and above all in your own country..." On 26 September 1939 the government of Édouard Daladier outlawed the PCF. Thirty five communist deputies and thousands of communist activists were arrested in the months that followed, and more than 3,000 communist refugees were interned as undesirable foreigners. Fried arranged for Thorez to escape to the Soviet Union via Belgium. He established himself in Brussels and continued to direct the PCF from there. In Brussels Fried created a clandestine Comintern base for all of Western Europe, in contact with Moscow through radio-telegraph and in control of the clandestine PCF.

In May 1940 the Germans invaded France, which agreed to the armistice of 22 June 1940. That day Fried received a detailed directive from Comintern leader Georgi Dimitrov and Thorez on what could be done to resist the German occupying forces. Immediately after the occupation, some of the French communists tried to obtain permission from the Germans to legally publish their journal, l'Humanité. It was not until early August 1941 that Fried was directed to break off all contact with the German authorities. The leadership of the French Communist Party in the period between the occupation of France and the German invasion of Russia on 22 June 1941 was divided between three locations. Secretary-general Maurice Thorez was in Moscow with André Marty. In Paris the clandestine party was directed by Benoît Frachon, aided by Arthur Dallidet. In hiding in Brussels were Jacques Duclos, who became the political leader of the party, and later the leader of the Communist Resistance, Maurice Tréand and Eugen Fried.

After Germany invaded the Soviet Union, Fried received cipher communications in which communists in Western Europe were told to "use all ways and means to make the people rise up and fight the occupiers" including demonstrations, strikes and sabotage. The Red Orchestra was a major Soviet intelligence network that operated throughout Western Europe. In December 1941 Dimitrov gave Fried instructions to contact the Red Orchestra head, Leopold Trepper. The meeting fell through since the Gestapo had taken the radio station of the Red Orchestra in Brussels and Trepper had fled to Paris. Further arrests took place in July 1942, and several agents were betrayed. Eugen Fried was assassinated in Brussels by unknown assailants on 17 August 1943. His true identity was not known at the time. After his death the post-war French communist leaders largely ignored the role he had played.

== Sources ==
- Amalric, Jaques (1997-02-10). "Livre. La biographie d'Eugen Fried". Libération (in French).
- Besse, Jean-Pierre; Pennetier, Claude (2006). Juin 40, la négociation secrète. Editions de l'Atelier. ISBN 978-2-7082-3866-4.
- Courtois, Stéphane (July 1998). "Eugen Fried, l'homme de l'ombre". Le Siècle Communiste (in French) (223).
- Courtois, Stéphane (2015). "FRIED EUGEN - (1900-1943)". Encyclopædia Universalis [online] (in French).
- Firsov, Fridrikh Igorevich; Klehr, Harvey; Haynes, John Earl (2014-05-27). Secret Cables of the Comintern, 1933-1943. Yale University Press. ISBN 978-0-300-19822-5.
- Jackson, Julian (2004-04-22). The Fall of France: The Nazi Invasion of 1940. OUP Oxford. ISBN 978-0-19-280550-8.
- Morgan, Kevin; Cohen, Gidon; Flinn, Andrew (2005-01-01). Agents of the Revolution: New Biographical Approaches to the History of International Communism in the Age of Lenin and Stalin. Peter Lang. ISBN 978-3-03910-075-0.
- Pons, Silvio (2014-08-28). The Global Revolution: A History of International Communism 1917-1991. OUP Oxford. ISBN 978-0-19-105410-5.
