= Maurice Tréand =

French communist member (1900–1949)

- Born: 21 September 1900; La Chaux-de-Fonds, Canton of Neuchâtel, Switzerland
- Died: 26 January 1949 (aged 48); Antony, Hauts-de-Seine, France
- Occupation: Communist leader
- Known for: Head of Cadre Commission

Maurice Tréand (21 September 1900 – 26 January 1949) was a French communist leader who was responsible for vetting party members in the period leading up to World War II. During the early part of the war, before the German invasion of the Soviet Union, he may have been indiscreet in discussions with the German occupiers of France. He was excluded from underground operations after the Communists became active in the French Resistance following the June 1941 German invasion of the Soviet Union.

== Early years ==
Maurice Tréand was born in 1900. He joined the French Communist Party (PCF, Parti communiste français), and from 1932 was in charge of the security of the PCF leaders, and of underground operations. Early in 1933 he was made secretary of the PCF's Cadre Commission. The Cadre Commission (commission des cadres) was set up to "verify" comrades and ensure "that a thing was what it was supposed to be" – to root out informers and politically unreliable members. One technique was to require that all PCF members fill out an autobiographical questionnaire, which could then be analyzed. The Cadre Commission was somewhat secretive, and worked directly with Maurice Thorez, Eugen Fried (Note: The Czechoslovak Eugen Fried was the Comintern "referent" who was given responsibility for overseeing the French Communist Party at the end of 1930.) and the Communist International's agencies. Tréand was criticized for taking his policing role to an extreme, for example classifying an activist as suspect if they had a distant cousin in the "forces of repression."

In October 1936 Arthur Dallidet was given a permanent position in the PCF Cadre Commission as assistant to Tréand. Dallidet was the second functionary to be assigned to the Commission. Tréand was a member of the PCE Central Committee from 1937 to 1945, and Executive Committee of the Communist International (ECCI) operative in Western Europe. Treand was close to Thorez, who always showed great respect for him, and also to Jacques Duclos, but does not seem to have had a strong relationship with André Marty. He was completely trusted by Moscow. However, the security arrangements he established before the war proved inadequate as the government stepped up its surveillance measures after the Molotov–Ribbentrop Pact of 23 August 1939 and the start of general mobilization in France.

== World War II ==
The PCE was officially dissolved in September 1939 after the outbreak of World War II (1939–45). The leadership of the French Communist Party in the period between the German occupation of France after the armistice of 22 June 1940 and the German invasion of Russia on 22 June 1941 was divided between three locations. Secretary-general Maurice Thorez was in Moscow with André Marty. In Paris the clandestine party was directed by Benoît Frachon, aided by Arthur Dallidet. In hiding in Brussels were Jacques Duclos, who became the political leader of the party, and later the leader of the Communist Resistance, Maurice Tréand and Eugen Fried. After Paris was occupied in June 1940 Tréand and Jean Catelas, the deputy for Amiens, began negotiations with the German ambassador for permission to resume open publication of the communist journal l'Humanité. The negotiations fell through, and the Soviet Union changed tack and condemned the attempt.

In mid-August 1940 Dallidet and Frachon decided not to use the safety devices and hideouts that Maurice Tréand had put in place, but to use a new network established by Dallidet. Tréand was allowed to continue setting up the clandestine structure in the northern zone, but received no further instructions. He was suspected to have been indiscreet due to trusting too much in the Soviet-German pact. Relations between Dallidet and his former boss Tréand were stormy after August 1940. In a report to Duclos dated 26 February 1941 Dallidet attacked Tréand, accusing him of "travail de groupe", an extreme offense in a Stalin-dominated party.

== Last years ==
Tréand was indicted by the candidates commission at the 10th congress of the PCF in June 1945. A series of photographs of Tréand taken in 1939, 1944, 1946 and 1948 show a steady deterioration in his physical and mental condition during this period. A commission called by Marty, with Henri Gourdeax and Marcel Servin, heard Treand some time before his death on 26 January 1949.

== Sources ==
- Besse, Jean-Pierre; Pennetier, Claude (2006). Juin 40, la négociation secrète. Editions de l'Atelier. ISBN 978-2-7082-3866-4.
- Boulouque, Sylvain; Bouju, Marie-Cécile; Frémontier, Jacques; Belloin, Gérard (2004). Le parti communiste français: archives et objet d'histoire. L'AGE D'HOMME. ISBN 978-2-8251-1922-8.
- Dauvergne, Christophe (2015). "Quand le PCF collaborait avec Hitler" (in French). Archived from the original on 2015-07-08.
- Dimitrov, Georgi (2008-10-01). The Diary of Georgi Dimitrov, 1933-1949. Yale University Press. ISBN 978-0-300-13385-1.
- Kriegel, Annie (1995). "Arrestation, detention et liberation de Palmiro Togliatti". Les Kominterniens. L'AGE D'HOMME. ISBN 978-2-8251-0640-2.
- Morgan, Kevin; Cohen, Gidon; Flinn, Andrew (2005-01-01). Agents of the Revolution: New Biographical Approaches to the History of International Communism in the Age of Lenin and Stalin. Peter Lang. ISBN 978-3-03910-075-0.
- Studer, Brigitte; Unfried, Berthold; Herrmann, Irène (2002). Parler de soi sous Staline. La construction identitaire dans le communisme des années trente (in French). Les Editions de la MSH. ISBN 978-2-7351-1359-0.
