= Eugène Hénaff =

French cement worker, Communist and trade union worker

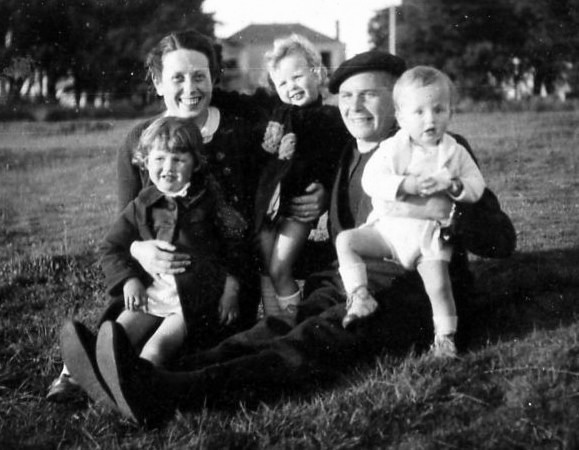
- Hénaff with his family in Spring of 1940
- Born: 30 October 1904; Spézet, Brittany, France
- Died: 28 October 1966 (aged 61)
- Occupation: Trade Union leader
- Known for: Resistance leader

Eugène Hénaff (French pronunciation: [øʒɛn enaf]; 30 October 1904 – 28 October 1966) was a French cement worker, Communist, trade union leader and member of the French Resistance during World War II (1939–45).

== Early years ==
Eugène Hénaff' was born on 30 October 1904 in Spézet, Brittany, to a family of farm laborers. From the age of ten he worked as a farm boy. His family moved to Paris, first to the Belleville district, then to Ménilmontant. Hénaff' became a butcher's boy, worked in a printing shop and then became a cement worker.

Hénaff joined the Confédération générale du travail unitaire (CGTU) in 1924, and then the French Communist Party (PCF). He was soon elected secretary of the cement workers' union, and then became regional secretary of the building unions. From 29 June to 29 August 1933 the building workers of Strasbourg went on strike, and the strike spread to enterprises elsewhere in Alsace and Moselle. Hénaff and Benoït Frachon, the national representatives, provided assistance to the local militants Auguste Walch, Frédéric Fassnacht, Joseph Mohn and Georges Woldi.

The rise of anti-semitism in Germany in the 1930s caused growing numbers of Jewish refugees to move to France. Union rank and file members were often openly hostile, and blamed the refugees for the Depression. Hénaff' pleaded in L'Humanité in November 1933 for French workers to welcome their German comrades, and to "break the existing xenophobic currents." In 1934 Hénaff was appointed secretary of the CGTU's regional union of Parisian trade unions. In 1936 he joined the PCF central committee. In this role he was among the negotiators of the Matignon Agreements of 1936 that ended the general strike, and was one of the signatories to the agreements. After the outbreak of the Spanish Civil War in 1936 Hénaff, Jean Zyromski and Georg Branting of the Commission Européenne d'Aide à l'Espagne published a manifesto that said, "The Spanish people would have already suppressed the Fascist rebellion if the rebel leaders had not been able to obtain, and did not still obtain, war matériel from international Fascist organizations.

== World War II ==
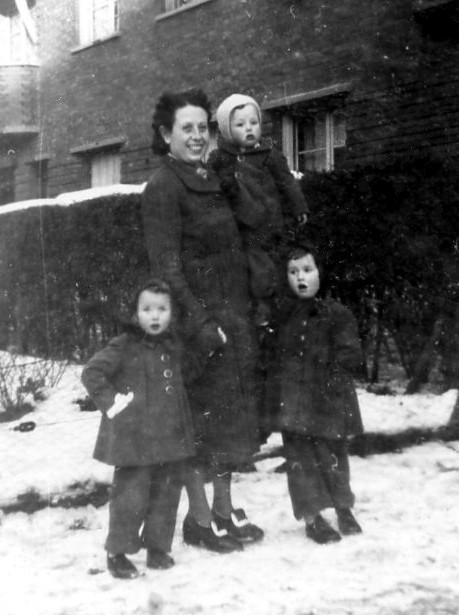
Germaine Hénaff and her children in Winter 1940

Hénaff was mobilized in 1939 at the start of World War II. He was taken prisoner at Châlons-sur-Marne, but managed to escape. A confidential police report on a clandestine meeting of communist militants on 24 July 1940 gave the attendees as Jean Catelas, former Deputy of the Somme, Hénaff and others. Hénaff was reported to be in very poor health. Catelas opened by saying the purpose was to lay the foundations of a "new unionism", which would be based on popular committees in factories. Militants should be extremely careful to avoid stimulating repressive counter moves. He obtained full agreement from the attendees. Hénaff, André Tollet and Jean-Pierre Timbaud began to form popular committees in the work places and clandestine unions.

On 20 October 1940 Hénaff was arrested again and imprisoned at Aincourt. He was moved to Fontevrault and then to Clairvaux. At Clairvaux he met François Poletti, a militant Communist since 1920. Poletti's wife Marie continued to collect and hide arms. She was later arrested and eventually died in Ravensbrück concentration camp. David Rosenfeld recovered the arms. Hénaff was next moved to Choisel. Rosenfeld's daughter Liliane became active in the Resistance at the age of 18. She helped form a group of young women and men that helped prisoners escape, and aided Henaff's escape on 18 June 1941. (Note: Liliane Rosenfeld also helped Pierre Georges (Colonel Fabien) escape from the fort of Romainville.) Other prisoners who escaped from the camp on 18–19 June 1941 were Fernand Grenier, Henri Raynaud, Léon Mauvais and Roger Sémat.

Hénaff resumed his underground activities under the pseudonym "Denis", and joined the leadership of the PCF's Organisation Spéciale, where he was responsible for coordinating between the various armed units. He was a member of the Comité militaire national, which became the Francs-tireurs et partisans français (FTPF) at the end of 1941. On 2 August 1941 Albert Ouzoulias was put in charge of the Bataillons de la Jeunesse, fighting groups that were being created by the Jeunesses Communistes. Soon after Arthur Dallidet introduced him to Hénaff, who was responsible for the armed struggle under the direction of Charles Tillon.

To avoid growing risk of arrest, Hénaff moved in 1943 with his wife and children from Paris to Lyon, where he directed the underground unions in the southern zone and liaised between the FTP and the Main-d'œuvre immigrée (MOI). He helped prepare the national insurrection when France was liberated, and after the Liberation of Paris returned to the capital and was made a lieutenant colonel.

== Post-war ==
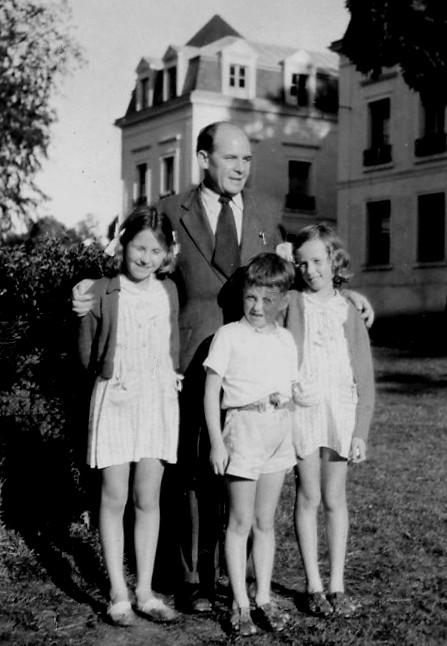
Hénaff with his children at L'Audronnière in Faverolles-sur-Cher in 1946

Hénaff was made a Knight of the Legion of Honour, and was given the Resistance Medal and the Croix de Guerre. In 1945 he became secretary-general of the CGT's Departmental Union of the Seine. He occupied this position until 1966. Hénaff was also a member of the PCF commission Syndicale, but did not always support PCF efforts to seize control of the labor movement.

5,350 workers of Renault's Boulogne-Billancourt plant went on strike in April 1947, catching the CGT by surprise. By the end of 28 April 12,000 workers were out. At first, Hénaff tried to suppress the movement, calling the leaders "Gaullist-Trotskyite Anarchists" and "Hitlero-Trotskyite provocateurs in the pay of de Gaulle." As the strike escalated, he was forced to swing round in support of the strikers. Hénaff, representing both the CGT and the PCF, gave his support at a protest meeting on 30 April. The strike ended on 16 May.

In April 1953 Henaff led the Communist list in the municipal elections of Le Pré-Saint-Gervais, but was defeated by a RPF–SFIO coalition led by Edmond Pépin. Eugène Hénaff' died on 28 October 1966 at the age of 61. His name was given to a polytechnic school at 55 avenue Raspail in Bagnolet, and to several roads. The Salle Eugène Hénaff is in the Varlin annex of the Paris Bourse du Travail at 29 Boulevard du Temple in the 3rd arrondissement. The 435-seat meeting room was inaugurated by the Mayor of Paris in 2007.

== Publications ==
- Lartigue, H. (1937). La Vérité sur l'U.R.S.S. Preface by Eugène Hénaff. Intersyndical des services publics. p. 128.
- Henaff, Eugene (1945). Le programme du parti: renaissance. Section Centrale d'Éducation du Parti Communiste français. p. 8.
- Comment défendre votre foyer et vos conditions d'existence. Preface by Eugène Hénaff. Sudoc [ABES]. 1949.
- Henaff, Eugene. Pour triompher de la misère. Vive l'unité. Les Propositions de la CGT et les articles de Benoît Frachon, secrétaire général de la CGT, pour la réalisation de l'unité.

== Sources ==
- Boulouque, Sylvain (2004). "La violence Communiste en France". Violence, guerre, révolution: l'exemple communiste. L'AGE D'HOMME. ISBN 978-2-8251-1942-6.
- Caron, Vicki (1999). Uneasy Asylum: France and the Jewish Refugee Crisis, 1933-1942. Stanford University Press. ISBN 978-0-8047-4377-8.
- "HENAFF Eugène". Bourse du Travail de Paris. 22 April 2012. Archived from the original on 23 September 2015.
- Houssin, Monique (2004). Résistantes et résistants en Seine-Saint-Denis: un nom, une rue, une histoire. Editions de l'Atelier. ISBN 978-2-7082-3730-8.
- Johnson, Douglas (6 December 1995). "Obituary: Albert Ouzoulias". The Independent (UK).
- "Livre - Les premiers internés "politiques"". Châteaubriant, Histoire et Résistance.
- Perlès, Valérie (2005). Le Pré, entre Paris et banlieue: histoire-s du Pré-Saint-Gervais. creaphis editions. ISBN 978-2-913610-54-5.
- Pike, David Wingeate (2011). France Divided: The French and the Civil War in Spain. Sussex Academic Press. ISBN 978-1-84519-490-1.
- Porin, Axel (2004). "Albert Ouzoulias". La Résistance en Ile-de-France. AERI.
- Ross, George (1982). Workers and Communists in France: From Popular Front to Eurocommunism. University of California Press. ISBN 978-0-520-04075-5.
- "Salle Eugène HENAFF". Bourse du Travail de Paris.
- Steinhouse, Adam (2001-01-01). Workers' Participation in Post-liberation France. Lexington Books. ISBN 978-0-7391-0283-1.
- Tasca, Angelo (1986). Vichy 1940-1944: quaderni e documenti inediti di Angelo Tasca. Feltrinelli Editore. ISBN 978-88-07-99044-1.
- Viet-Depaule, Nathalie (2002). La Mission de Paris: cinq prêtres-ouvriers insoumis témoignent. KARTHALA Editions. ISBN 978-2-84586-291-3.
