= Madeleine Passot =

French communist and member of the French Resistance (1914–2009)

- Madeleine Passot in Sweden in 1945
- Born: 28 August 1914; Paris, France
- Died: 19 September 2009 (aged 95); Paris, France
- Other names: "Lucienne Langlois", "Betty"

Madeleine Passot (28 August 1914 – 19 September 2009) was a French communist who worked for the French Resistance as a liaison agent during World War II (1939–45). She was arrested and deported to the Auschwitz concentration camp, but survived the war and returned to France. She became Madeleine Jégouzo by marriage in 1947.

== Early years ==
Madeleine Passot was born on 28 August 1914 in the 15th arrondissement of Paris. At the time of her birth her father, Jean Baptiste Passot, was in prison for having demonstrated against World War I as a follower of Jean Jaurès. Her father worked in a variety of jobs. He apprenticed as a baker, and later worked in a metal foundry and for automobile factories, including Talbot and then Citroën. Madeleine grew up in Boulogne-Billancourt.

Madeleine Passot joined the French Communist Party (PCF) in 1936. She became a member of the party's Union des jeunes filles de France (UJFF). In 1938 she accepted a permanent job with the PCF, where she met Maurice Tréand, head of the cadres organization. With the approach of World War II (1939–45) she was given the job of secretly preparing for the survival of the party if it were made illegal, as seemed likely. This included arranging hiding places for the party records, couriers and mailboxes.

== World War II ==
After the outbreak of war the party was dissolved, and during the Phoney War period Madeleine Passot's activity increased. She helped in organizing the Resistance forces with Jacques Duclos and Arthur Dallidet. She worked as a liaison agent under the aliases "Lucienne Langlois" or "Betty". Madeleine Passot traveled throughout France recruiting new members of the communist resistance. She would often sit beside Germans on trains in the expectation that they would gallantly protect the elegant young woman, unaware that she was carrying money and papers hidden in her luggage and handbag.

Dallidet was recognized talking to a woman in a cafe beside the Reuilly metro station on the evening on 28 February 1942. He was arrested, taken to La Santé Prison, chained, handcuffed and severely beaten. He did not reveal any information, but had been carrying a long list of names and addresses. This led to other arrests including "Betty" (Madeleine Passot), Dallidet's most important liaison officer. Madeleine Passot was arrested in Paris in March 1942 and imprisoned in Fort de Romainville. Further names and addresses were found in her apartment. She was carrying false identity papers in the name of "Lucienne Langlois", and retained this identity throughout her subsequent imprisonment.

Madeleine Passot was part of the Convoi des 31000 (Convoy of the 31000s) that left for Auschwitz on 24 January 1943. Others in the convoy included Marie-Claude Vaillant-Couturier and Danielle Casanova. On arrival her identity number, 31668, was tattooed on the inside of her lower left arm, one of a series from the transport number 31,000 that had brought the group of women to the camp. Danielle Casanova, who was a trained dentist, introduced Madeleine Passot as a nurse. She worked in appalling conditions during a typhus epidemic at the camp in April–May 1943, during which Casanova died. On 4 August 1944 she was transferred to Ravensbrück concentration camp, where she continued nursing until the camp was liberated. She was released from Ravensbrück by the Swedish Red Cross on 23 April 1945.

== Later years ==
Madeleine Passot returned to France on 23 June 1945, and resumed her real name. She married Mathurin Jégouzo in 1947. They moved to Morocco in 1949 to found an import-export company. They returned and settled in the Var in the mid-1960s. In the mid-1980s Madeleine Jégouzo returned to Paris after the death of her husband. She died at home on 19 September 2009. She was an Officer of the Legion of Honour, holder of the Médaille militaire, the Croix de Guerre with Palm, the Resistance Medal and the Volunteer combatant's cross.

== See also ==
- Convoi des 31000

== Sources ==
- "Archives de Madeleine Jégouzo". BnF.
- Freeman, John (2011-05-19). Granta 115: The F Word. Granta Publications. ISBN 978-1-905881-52-9.
- Jégouzo, Yves (2011). Madeleine dite Betty: déportée résistante à Auschwitz-Birkenau. Harmattan. ISBN 978-2-296-55166-4.
- Jégouzo, Yves (2014-06-14). "Madeleine, dite »Betty » JÉGOUZO, née Passot, alias Lucienne Langlois – 31668".
- Moorehead, Caroline (2011-11-01). A Train in Winter: An Extraordinary Story of Women, Friendship and Survival in World War Two. Random House of Canada. ISBN 978-0-307-36667-2.
- "Mort de la résistante Madeleine Jegouzo". Le Figaro (in French). 2009-09-24.
