= Raymonde Tillon =

French politician

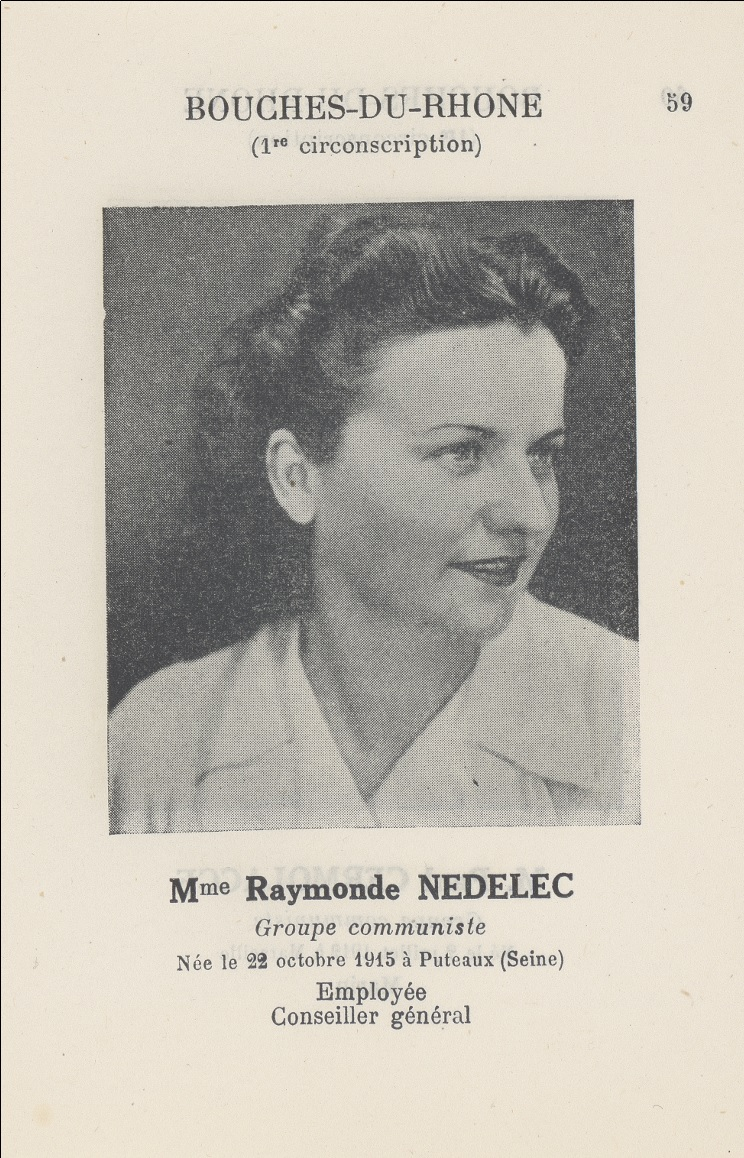

Member of the National Assembly for Bouches-du-Rhône
- In office 1945–1951

Personal details
- Born: Raymonde Barbé; 22 October 1915 Puteaux, France
- Died: 17 July 2016 (aged 100) Paris, France
- Party: PCF
- Spouse: Charles Tillon

Raymonde Tillon (22 October 1915 – 17 July 2016) was a French politician. She was affiliated with the French Communist Party and was in the French Resistance during the Second World War.

Born Raymonde Barbé on 22 October 1915 in Puteaux, she married the communist Charles Nédelec in 1935. An early member of the Resistance, Tillon was arrested in 1941 and sentenced to twenty years hard labor by a court in Toulon. She was imprisoned in Marseille, Toulon and Lyon before being captured by the Germans in June 1944 and deported first to Saarbrücken, and then to the Ravensbrück concentration camp. On 20 April 1945, she escaped from German custody at a plant in Leipzig and made her way to Marseille. She was an MP for Bouches-du-Rhône from 1945 to 1951. She married Communist leader Charles Tillon in 1951 and had two children, Itea (1950) and Nadia (1952). After a strong condemnation of the Soviet invasion of Czechoslovakia in 1968, she was banned from the Communist Party. She edited her husband's memoirs after his death in 1993.

She died at the age of 100 on 17 July 2016. She was the last survivor of the 33 women elected to the first Constituent Assembly of the French Fourth Republic.
