= Alain Le Léap =

Alain Henry Hervé Joseph Le Léap (29 September 1905 – 26 December 1986) was a French trade union leader.

== Biography ==
Born in Lanmeur, Le Léap studied law in Rennes. He began teaching at a boarding school, and founded a union branch there. In 1928, he became a tax inspector, and joined the relevant union, an affiliate of the General Confederation of Labour (CGT). From 1938, he worked in the union's office, and in 1939, he was elected as its general secretary.

During World War II, Le Léap helped to rebuild the Civil Servants' Federation, becoming its general secretary in 1946, in which role he began working with members of the Communist Party of France (PCF). After the liberation of France, he was appointed as the commissioner of the National Council of Resistance to the Minister of Finance, and from 1947 until 1950, he served on the Economic Council.

The CGT suffered a major split in 1947, with many non-communists leaving, but Le Léap remained loyal to the federation. In January 1948, he was appointed as general secretary of the CGT, serving alongside Benoît Frachon, and also became a vice president of the World Federation of Trade Unions.

In 1952, Le Léap participated in demonstrations against a visit by American general Matthew Ridgway to Paris. He was arrested on charges of demoralising the army, and spent ten months in prison. The year after his release, he was awarded the Stalin Peace Prize.

Le Léap opposed the Soviet invasion of Hungary in 1956, and persuaded the CGT not to take a position on it. The stress of this damaged his mental health, and he did not attend the CGT's congress the following year. He was, nonetheless, re-elected as its general secretary, but resigned in September 1957.

In 1971, Le Léap was elected as a local councillor in Le Pradet, on the communist list, despite not being a party member. He later joined the PCF, serving as mayor from 1977 to 1979, and as a councillor until 1983.

Trade union offices
Preceded by Charles Laurent	General Secretary of the Civil Servants' Federation; 1946–1948	Succeeded by Marcel Ragon
Preceded by Benoît Frachon and Léon Jouhaux	General Secretary of the General Confederation of Labour; 1948–1957; With: Benoît Frachon	Succeeded by Benoît Frachon
