= Les Bordes, Loiret =

Les Bordes
- Commune
- Location of Les Bordes
- Location within France Location within Centre-Val de Loire
- Coordinates: 47°48′48″N 2°24′11″E
- Country: France
- Region: Centre-Val de Loire
- Department: Loiret
- Arrondissement: Orléans
- Canton: Sully-sur-Loire

Government
  - Mayor (2020–2026): Gérard Boudier
- Area^{1}: 24.02 km^{2} (9.27 sq mi)
- Highest elevation: 150 m (490 ft)
- Lowest elevation: 112 m (367 ft)
- Population (2023): 1,853
  - Density: 77.14/km^{2} (199.8/sq mi)
- Time zone: UTC+01:00 (CET)
  - Summer (DST): UTC+02:00 (CEST)
- INSEE/Postal code: 45042 /45460
- ^{1} French Land Register data, which excludes lakes, ponds, glaciers > 1 km^{2} (0.386 sq mi or 247 acres) and river estuaries.

Les Bordes (French pronunciation: [le bɔʁd]) is a commune in the Loiret department in north-central France. It is the site of Les Bordes golf course, ranked the number one golf course in Europe and in the top 10 courses in the world.

== Population ==
Historical population
| Year | Pop. | ±% p.a. |
|---|---|---|
| 1968 | 861 | — |
| 1975 | 1,024 | +2.51% |
| 1982 | 1,117 | +1.25% |
| 1990 | 1,389 | +2.76% |
| 1999 | 1,445 | +0.44% |
| 2007 | 1,671 | +1.83% |
| 2012 | 1,831 | +1.85% |
| 2017 | 1,892 | +0.66% |
| 2023 | 1,853 | −0.35% |
Source: INSEE

== Golf course ==
Originally conceived by Baron Marcel Bich of Bic pens and razors fame, the Les Bordes golf course is built on what was previously his 1,700-acre (690 ha) hunting estate. The Les Bordes golf course was the first course designed and built in France by Robert von Hagge.

The Les Bordes Estate was taken over by an affiliate of RoundShield Partners in 2018. Since then, a fully private golf club with an international membership has been established. Six Senses Hotels also recently announced the projected opening of a luxury hotel (completely separate from the golf club) on the estate in 2022. A multitude of other non-golf amenities are also planned to complete in the near term.

A second 18-hole golf course and a 10-hole par three course designed by Gil Hanse are currently being built at Les Bordes. Both will be additions to the private golf club facilities.

== See also ==
- Communes of the Loiret department
