= Francs-Tireurs et Partisans =

French resistance group during World War II

Francs-tireurs et partisans
- Francs-tireurs et partisans français
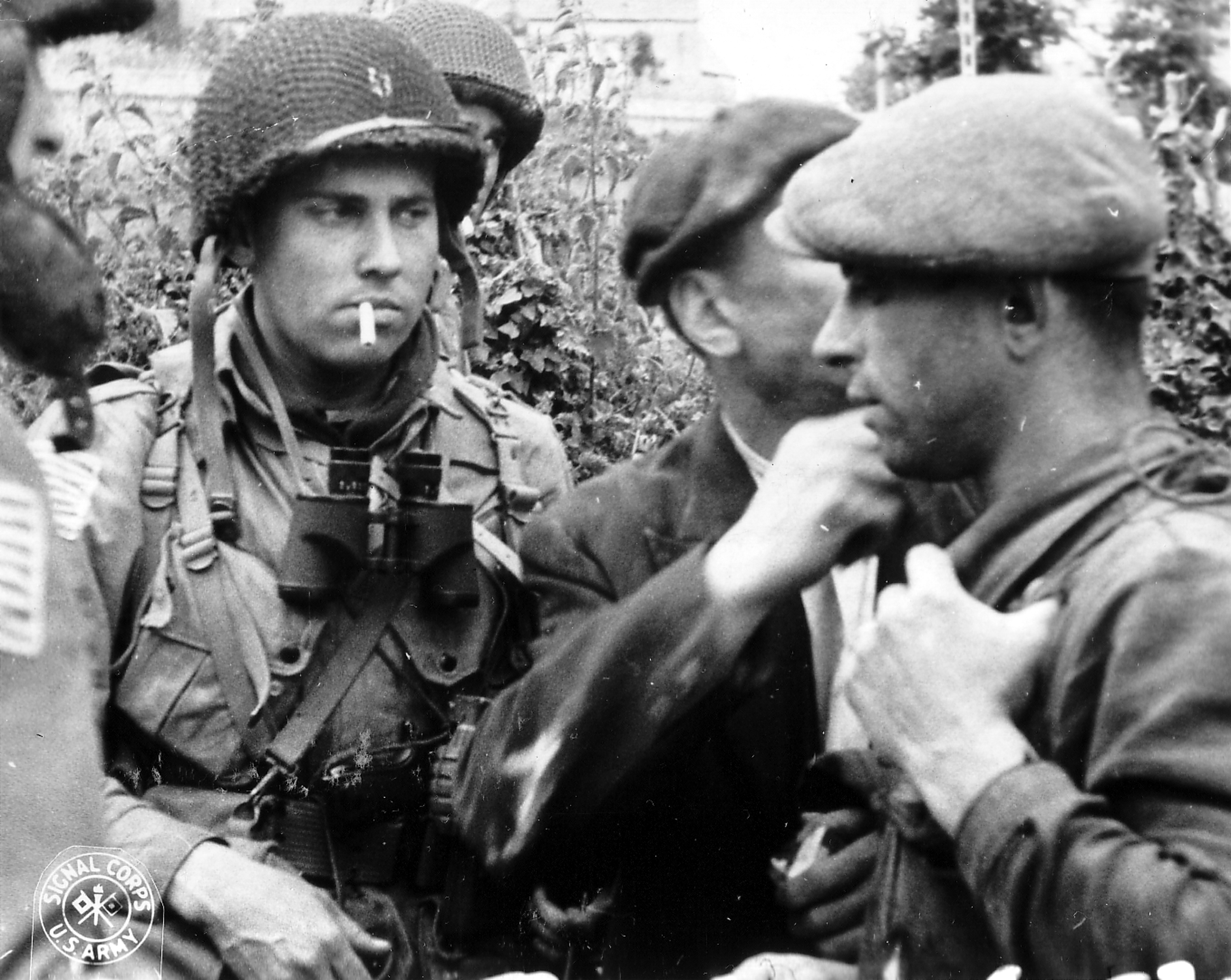
- Paratroopers and FTP members during the Battle of Normandy, summer 1944
- Leaders: Charles Tillon; Jules Dumont; Georges Vallet; Albert Ouzoulias; Eugène Hénaff; René Camphin
- Dates active: October 1941 - February 1, 1944
- Groups: FTP-MOI; National Front
- Ideology: Communism; Anti-fascism
- Political position: Far-left
- Part of: French Communist Party
- Wars: French Resistance, World War II

The Francs-tireurs et partisans français (Note: Francs-tireurs (free-shooters) was a term for irregular military applied to formations deployed by France during the early stages of the Franco-Prussian War (1870–71).) (French: [fʁɑ̃ tiʁœʁ e paʁtizɑ̃ fʁɑ̃sɛ]; FTPF), or commonly the Francs-tireurs et partisans (FTP), was an armed resistance organization created by leaders of the French Communist Party during World War II (1939–45). The communist party was neutral at first, following the Soviet Union's official view that the war was a struggle between imperialists, but changed to a policy of armed resistance against the German occupation of France after Germany invaded the Soviet Union in June 1941. Three groups were formed, consisting of party members, young communists and foreign workers. Early in 1942 they were merged to form the FTP, which undertook sabotage and assassinations of the occupation. The FTP became the best organized and most effective of the French Resistance groups. In March 1944, before the Allied forces returned to Normandy, the FTP was theoretically merged with the other Resistance groups. In practice, it retained its independence until the end of the war.

== Background ==
Germany attacked the Soviet Union on 22 June 1941 in Operation Barbarossa. With this, the policy of the French Communist Party (Parti communiste français, PCF) switched to support for armed struggle against the German occupiers. The National Front (Front national de l'indépendance de la France) was created as a French Resistance movement in the northern area in June 1941. The Front national was theoretically independent of the PCF, but in reality it was dominated by the PCF. At first the objectives were mainly political, taking advantage of the unstable situation under the occupying German army. Charles Tillon was put in charge of military matters.

On 2 August 1941 Albert Ouzoulias was put in charge of the Bataillons de la Jeunesse, fighting groups that were being created by the Jeunesses Communistes. Soon after, Arthur Dallidet introduced him to Eugène Hénaff, who was responsible for the armed struggle under the direction of Tillon. In October 1941 the PCF decided to unify its armed groups into the Organisation spéciale. Hénaff joined the leadership of the PCF's Organisation Spéciale, where he was responsible for coordinating between the various armed units. He was a member of the Comité militaire national, which became the Francs-tireurs et partisans français (FTPF).

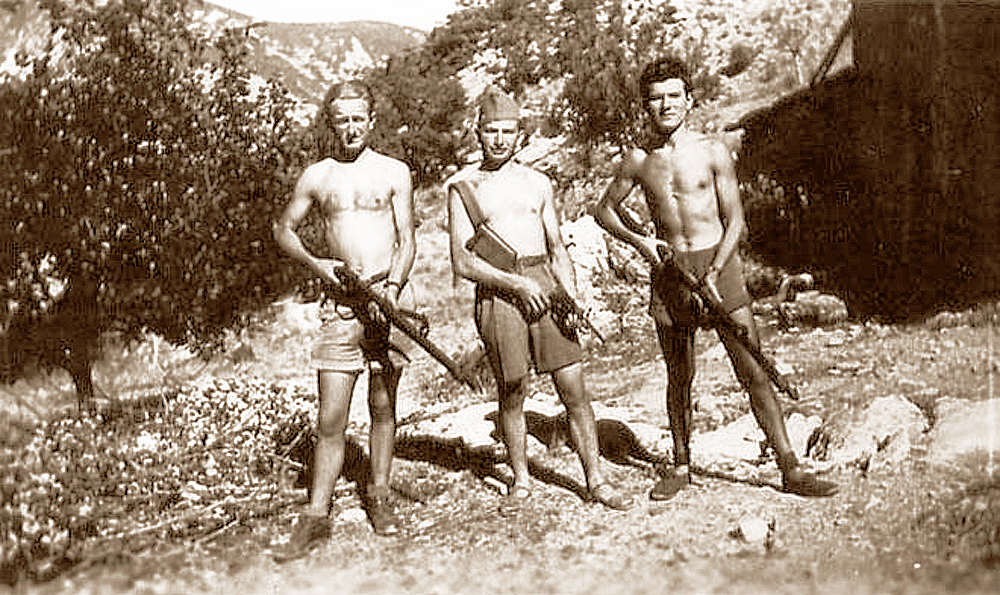
FTP fighters at the camp of Roche-Saint-Secret-Béconne in May 1943

== Formation ==
Rather than limit armed action to Communists, it was decided to create a non-Communist organization, the Francs-Tireurs et Partisans (FTP), under the Front national. The FTP was open to non-communists but operated under communist control. The FTP movement was seen as a way to increase the political influence of the Communist Party in the future government of France. A special issue of L'Humanité in February 1942 confirmed the existence of "partisans et de francs-tireurs" (partisans and free-shooters) to whom patriots should give aid and assistance. Another special issue in March 1942 urged people to form such groups to conduct guerrilla war and help the population defend itself against the "boches".

The FTP was created in April 1942, led by Charles Tillon. On 3 April 1942 L'Humanité used the expression "Francs-Tireurs et Partisans" for the first time, and in following weeks reported acts of sabotage of war production and attacks against German soldiers and French collaborators. The paper began using the initials FTP in July 1942. The FTP's mandate was to sabotage railways and factories, punish collaborators and assassinate German soldiers.

== Organization ==
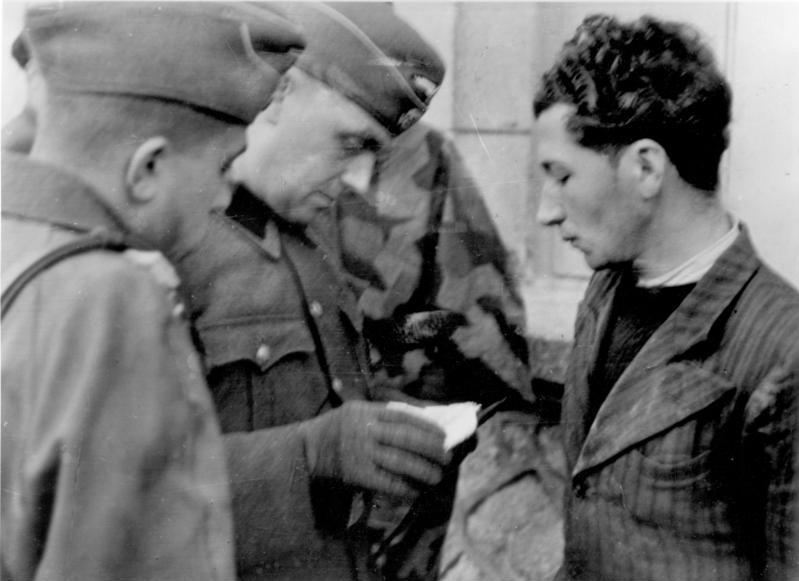
A captured Resistance fighter in 1944. The German caption says "This communist leader is on the wanted list ... his papers prove his affiliation with terrorist groups."

The FTP unified three Communist organizations, the Bataillons de la Jeunesse, the Organisation Spéciale and the Main-d'œuvre immigrée (MOI). The FTP national committee was headed by Charles Tillon, commander in chief. Eugène Hénaff was political commissioner of the force until May 1943, when he was replaced by René Camphin. Albert Ouzoulias was in charge of operations, and Georges Beyer was responsible for armaments and recruitment. Marcel Prenant, a captain of the reserve, was Chief of Staff. He wrote some of the manuals on tactics and armament, but his main role was to act as liaison between the FTP and the Gaullist resistance groups.

The inter-regional and departmental military committees reported to the central organization in groups of three, a basic principle in the communist Resistance. In the field, each group would consist of two groups of three or four men under a commander and his assistant. For as long as possible they would continue to work in their normal occupations, only coming together to undertake an operation and then if possible returning to their normal daily life. Ouzoulias was a proponent of quick strikes against carefully studied targets by small groups of fighters, who would then rapidly withdraw. He also drew up guidelines for urban warfare in which FTP units could attack greatly superior German forces and be protected while they withdrew. Tillon called this a strategy of "drops of mercury", through which the group could use surprise and mobility to achieve transient superiority before disappearing.

The FTP-MOI (Francs-tireurs et partisans – main-d'œuvre immigrée) was created in the spring of 1942 with four detachments made up of communists of "immigrant" origin. Most of its fighters were Jews from France, Hungary, Romania or elsewhere in Europe. Some were former volunteers in the International Brigades of the Spanish Civil War (1936–39). Leaflets and publications were issued in Yiddish. Although integrated with the FTP, the FTP-MOI groups retained their autonomy, which caused problems at times. The FTP-MOI were aroused to violent reprisals against the Germans by the Vel' d'Hiv Roundup in July 1942 in which Jews in Paris and other parts of France were arrested, detained and then deported to be killed in the Auschwitz concentration camp. The violence of the FTP-MOI in their struggle for survival did not always coincide with the interests of the French people. They received little recognition in France after the war.

The FTP-MOI were the target of the notorious Affiche Rouge poster campaign, which emphasised the composition of the group's membership in an attempt to discredit the Resistance as not "French" enough. The campaign seems to have had the effect of highlighting their feats to the general public as freedom fighters.

== History ==
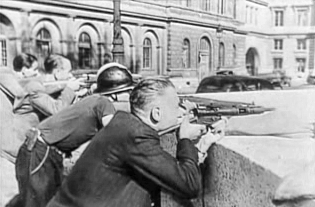
French résistants firing in a skirmish during the battle for Paris

The military strength of the communists was still relatively feeble at the end of 1941, but the rapid growth of the FTP ensured that French communists regained their reputation as an effective anti-fascist force. Arthur Dallidet was placed in charge of security. Dallidet was recognized talking to a woman in a cafe beside the Reuilly metro station on the evening on 28 February 1942. He was arrested, taken to La Santé Prison, chained, handcuffed and severely beaten. He did not reveal any information, but had been carrying a long list of names and addresses. This led to other arrests including "Betty" (Madeleine Passot), his most important liaison officer. Further names and addresses were found in Betty's apartment.

Gradually the FTP developed a more military organization, with sections, companies and battalions, each containing three lower-level groups. There were often gaps in this paper organization. The FTP complained that the British and Gaullists were deliberately depriving them of arms, although more likely the problem was that they did not have the necessary contacts to arrange delivery.

In November 1943 Joseph Epstein, the FTP Chief of Staff, was arrested and subjected to extreme torture, but revealed nothing. (Note: Epstein was shot at Fort Mont-Valérien on 11 April 1944. Ouzoulias called Joseph Epstein "the greatest military tactician of the entire Resistance.") This was followed by a major police operation that largely destroyed the FTP's Paris organization. From the end of 1943 the national organization began to intensify preparation for a national uprising to support the expected Allied landings in Europe.

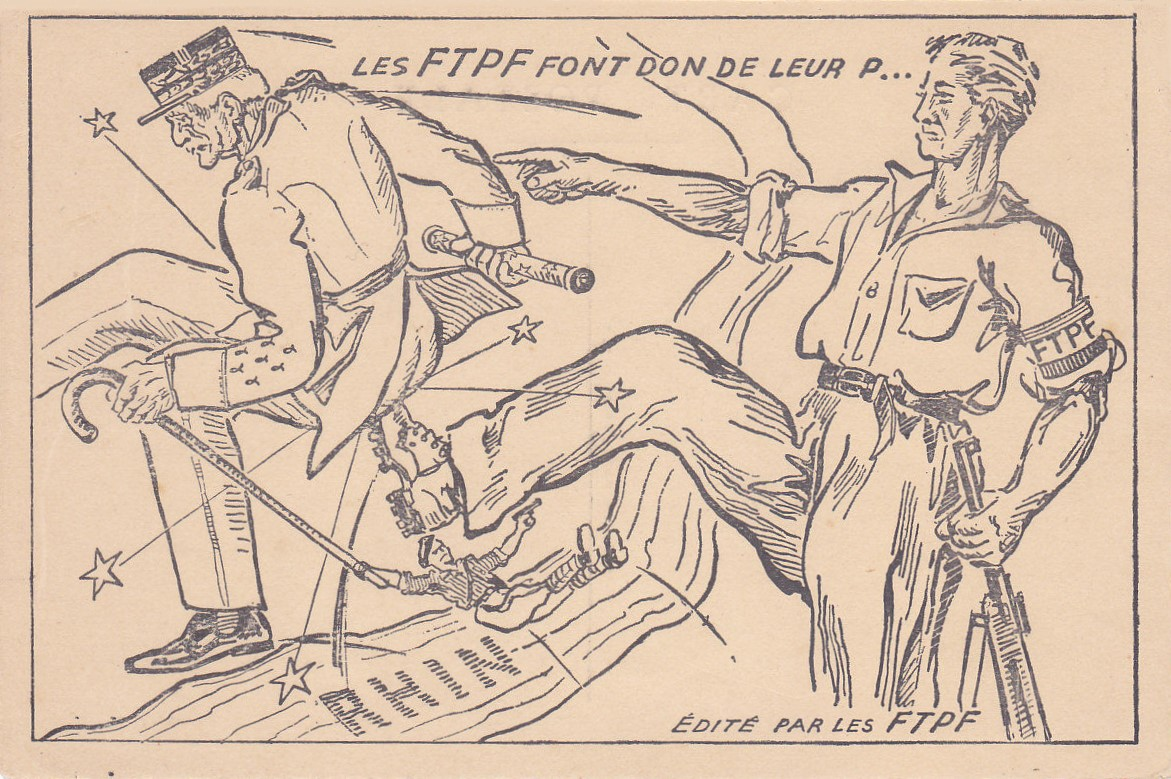
Postcard depicting an FTP member sending Pétain with a kick in the behind to the other bank of the Rhine river, 1944.

By 1944, the FTP had an estimated strength of 100,000 men and women. In March 1944 General Charles de Gaulle placed all the French Forces of the Interior (Forces françaises de l'intérieur, FFI) under the authority of General Marie-Pierre Kœnig, but the FTP retained its de facto independence. During the Allied Normandy Campaign the FTP conducted delaying actions in the center and southwest of France against the German troops who had been recalled to the battle zone.

=== Liberation of Paris ===
From June to August 1944 Ouzoulias coordinated the FTP's military action in the Paris region. Ouzoulias and Colonel Henri Rol-Tanguy, who led the Île-de-France Resistance movement, planned a major rising in Paris which played a vital role during the August 1944 Liberation of Paris.

The FFI in Paris led by Alexandre Parodi and Jacques Chaban-Delmas urged patience while Tanguy wanted to start a revolt, being deterred only by the fact that the Resistance in Paris had about 15,000 men, but only 600 guns, mostly rifles and machine guns. On 19 August 1944, the Paris police, until then still loyal to Vichy, went over to the Resistance as a group of policemen hosted the tricolore over the Préfecture de Police on the Ile de la Cité, which was the first time the tricolor had flown in Paris since June 1940. Emboldened, Tanguy and his men started to attack German forces on the Boulevard Saint-Michel and Boulevard Saint-Germain, leading to a mass insurrection as Parisians started to build barricades in the streets. By the end of the day, about 50 Germans and 150 résistants had been killed and not wanting the Communists to have the credit for liberating Paris, the Gaullist Parodi sanctioned the uprising.

Faced with an urban uprising that he was unprepared for, the city's German commander Dietrich von Choltitz arranged a truce with Parodi via the Swedish consul Raoul Nordling, marking the first time that the Germans had treated the resistance as a legitimate opponent. But they skirmished on 22 August, when some German units tried to leave their fortifications. On 23 August, under Choltitz's orders, the Germans opened fire on the Grand Palais, an FFI stronghold, and German tanks fired at the barricades in the streets. Hitler gave the order to inflict maximum damage on the city.

Among those participating in the fighting were those resisters freed on 19 August Four in a Nordling negotiated prisoner exchange. These included 19 year-old Madeleine Riffaud who on 23 August led the FTP operation that trapped a train carrying loot and munitions from the city in the Buttes-Chaumont tunnel and secured the surrender of the 80 German soldiers aboard.

On the 25 August, after an advance unit of General Leclerc's 2nd Armored Division, "La Nueve" (160 men, most of whom were Spanish Republicans) had broken into the city and reached the Hotel de Ville, von Choltitz capitulated. The last FTP operation in the city (in which Riffaud also participated) was on the 26th, an attack on the barracks on Place de la République, whose garrison who refused to accept von Choltitz's order to surrender.

=== Demobilisation ===
On 28 August 1944 de Gaulle put Ouzoulias in charge of the FTP and the FFI. In the autumn of 1944 Ouzoulias was charged by de Gaulle with integrating the FTP members with the regular French army. In October 1944 the communist militias were dissolved and the FTP was integrated into General de Lattre's army.

In 2019, a surviving member of FTP, Edmond Réveil, revealed details of the June 1944 execution of up to 40 Nazi occupiers, taken during the Tulle uprising, along with a woman collaborator, at Le Vert, near Meymac. After delay due to the COVID-19 pandemic, forensic examination of the likely burial site only began in May 2023, initially using ground-penetrating radar. 11 bodies had been found at the site in 1967; by August 2023 artefacts had been unearthed, but no further bodies.

== See also ==
- Free France
- Lille during World War II
- Maquis (World War II)
- Military history of France during World War II
- Organisation de résistance de l'armée
- Resistance during World War II
- Zone libre

== Sources ==
- Ariès, Phillippe; Duby, Georges (1998). A History of Private Life, Volume V, Riddles of Identity in Modern Times. Cambridge, Massachusetts & London: Belknap Press. ISBN 978-0-674-40004-7.
- "Charles, Joseph TILLON". Base de données des députés français depuis 1789. French National Assembly.
- "HENAFF Eugène". Bourse du Travail de Paris. 22 April 2012. Archived from the original on 23 September 2015.
- Johnson, Douglas (6 December 1995). "Obituary: Albert Ouzoulias". The Independent (UK).
- Kerenji, Emil (2014-10-10). Jewish Responses to Persecution: 1942–1943. Rowman & Littlefield Publishers. ISBN 978-1-4422-3627-1.
- Lallier, Rose; Logak, Elisabeth (2015). "Albert Ouzoulias (1915 – 1995)". Figures humaines. Archived from the original on 2015-06-03.
- Marcot, François (1996). La Résistance et les Français: lutte armée et maquis : colloque international de Besançon 15-17 juin. Presses Univ. Franche-Comté. ISBN 978-2-251-60617-0.
- Marcot, François; Musiedlak, Didier (2006). Les résistances, miroirs des régimes d'oppression, Allemagne, France, Italie: actes du colloque international de Besançon organisé du 24 au 26 septembre 2003 par le Musée de la résistance et de la déportation de Besançon, l'Université de Franche-Comté et l'Université de Paris X. Presses Univ. Franche-Comté. ISBN 978-2-84867-123-9.
- Marin, Armel (2015). "F.T.P. (Francs-tireurs et partisans)". Encyclopædia Universalis (in French).
- Marshall, Bruce (2001) [1952]. The White Rabbit: The Secret Agent the Gestapo Could Not Crack. London: Cassell & Co. ISBN 978-0-304-35697-3.
- Moorehead, Caroline (2011-11-01). A Train in Winter: An Extraordinary Story of Women, Friendship and Survival in World War Two. Random House of Canada. ISBN 978-0-307-36667-2.
- Porin, Axel (2004). "Albert Ouzoulias". La Résistance en Ile-de-France. AERI.
- Zuccotti, Susan (1999). The Holocaust, the French, and the Jews. U of Nebraska Press. ISBN 0-8032-9914-1.
