= Raymond Guyot =

French politician (1903–1986)

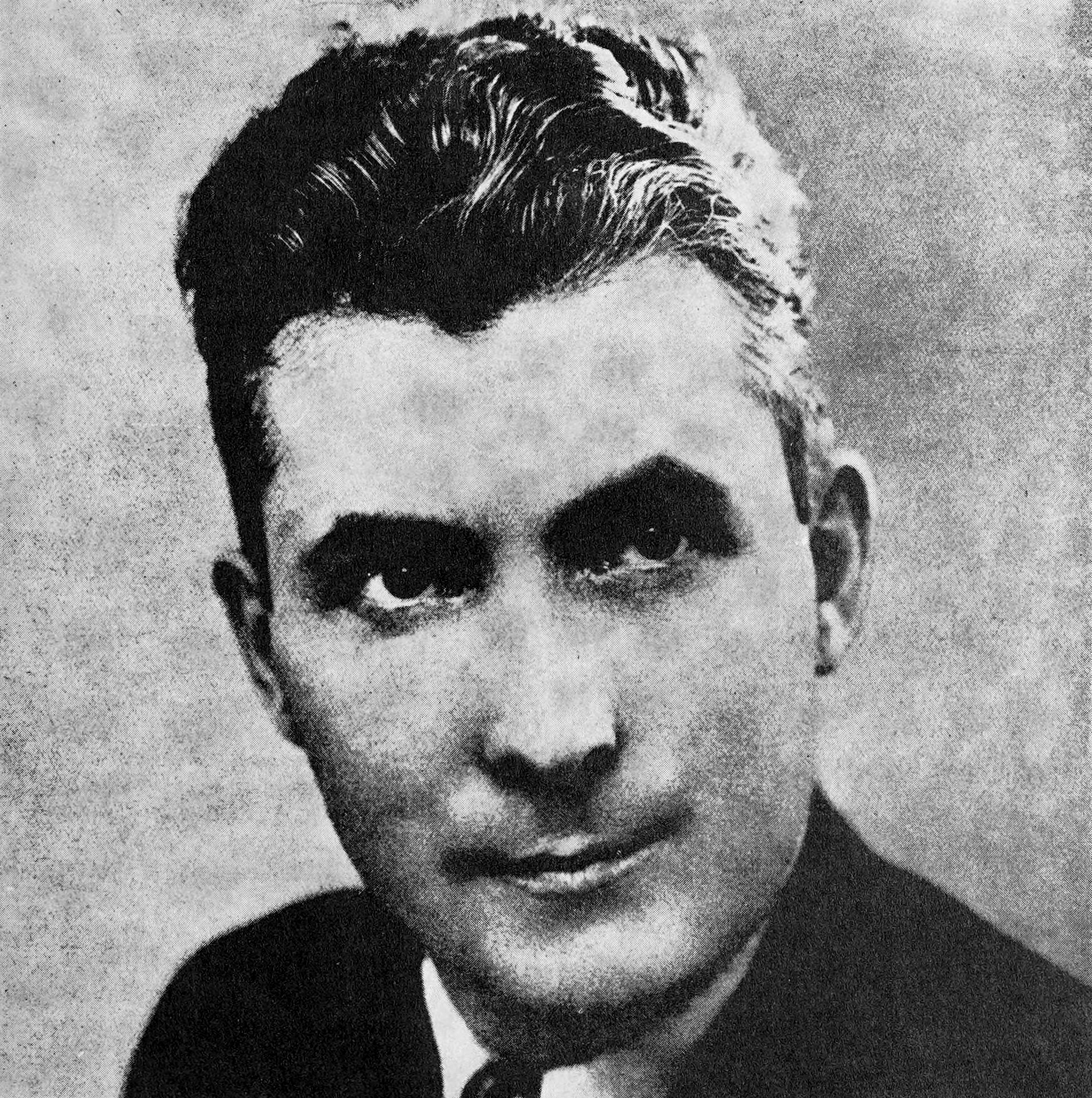
- Guyot c. 1938
- Born: November 17, 1903; Auxerre, Yonne, French Third Republic
- Died: April 17, 1986 (aged 82); Fleury-Mérogis, Essonne, French Fifth Republic
- Political party: PCF
- Other political affiliations: GDR

Raymond Guyot (November 17, 1903 - April 17, 1986) was a French politician, leader of the French Communist Party (PCF).

== Biography ==
Guyot was born in Auxerre. He joined the PCF in 1921, and was elected a member of its Central Committee seven years later. From 1935 to 1943 he was a high-ranking member of the Presidium of the Communist International for Youth and was general secretary of the Executive Committee for a period.

He was a member of the Politbureau of the PCF from 1945 to 1972. He was also deputy to the National Assembly from 1937–40 and 1946–58, and was made a senator in 1959. He died in Paris, aged 82.
