= Claudine Chomat =

French communist militant and WWII French Resistance member

Claudine Chomat (7 February 1915 – 15 October 1995) was a French communist militant and a member of the French Resistance during the Second World War.

Chomat was born at Saint-Etienne (Loire), her father having died a few months earlier, while on active service in the First World War. She committed herself to the French Communist Party in 1934 and helped found the Union of Young Girls in France (l'Union des Jeunes Filles de France) in 1936, with Danielle Casanova, Marie-Claude Vaillant-Couturier, and Jeannette Vermeersch. In 1937, she married Victor Michaut, a communist leader; the marriage lasted ten years.

At the end of 1939, she participated in the reorganization of the French Communist Party (PCF) which had been made illegal by the Edouard Daladier government. She led the women's resistance committees beginning in 1941, she founded the Union of French Women (today called Femmes solidaires) in 1944, and she served as secretary-general of that organization. In 1950, she joined the central committee of the PCF.

In 1948, she became the second wife of the communist leader, Laurent Casanova. As Casanova's wife, she suffered the disgrace of the party following the Servin-Casanova scandal in 1961. She died in Boulogne-Billancourt (Hauts-de-Seine), aged 80.
