= André Marty =

French politician (1886–1956)

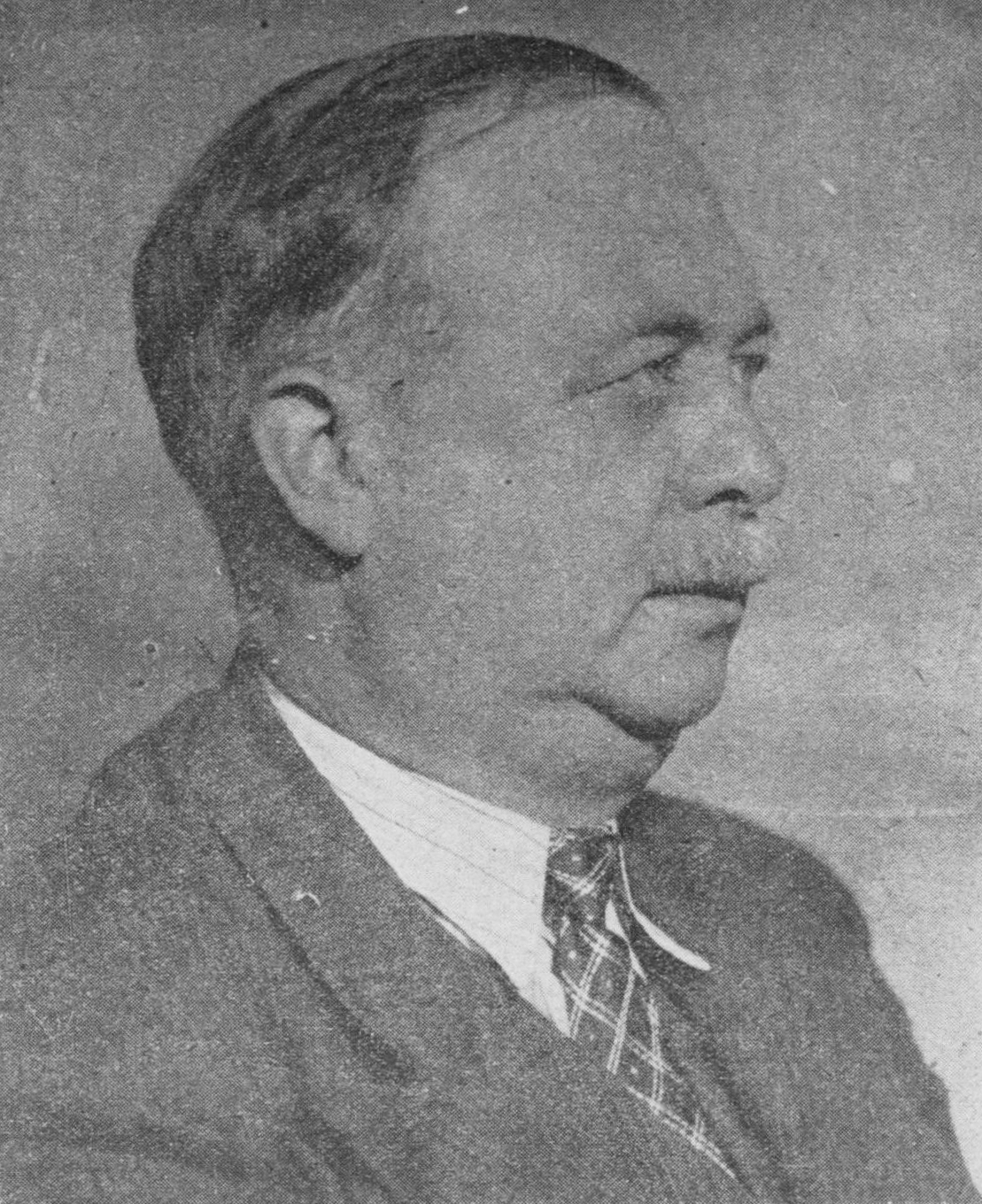
- Marty in 1936

Member of the National Assembly
- In office 28 November 1946–December 1955
- Constituency: Seine
- In office 6 November 1945–27 November 1946
- Constituency: Seine
- In office 1 June 1936–21 June 1940
- Constituency: Seine
- In office 3 February 1929–31 May 1932
- Constituency: Seine
- In office 11 April 1924–31 May 1928
- Constituency: Seine-et-Oise

Personal details
- Born: 6 November 1886 Perpignan, Pyrénées-Orientales, French Third Republic
- Died: 23 November 1956 (aged 70) Toulouse, Haute-Garonne, French Fourth Republic
- Party: French Communist Party (1923–1952)

André Marty (6 November 1886 – 23 November 1956) was a leading figure in the French Communist Party (PCF) for nearly thirty years. He was also a member of the National Assembly, with some interruptions, from 1924 to 1955; Secretary of Comintern from 1935 to 1943; and Political Commissar of the International Brigades during the Spanish Civil War from 1936 to 1938.

== Early years ==
Marty was born in Perpignan, France, into a left-leaning but comfortable family; his father was a wine merchant. As a youngster, Marty tried to win a place in open competition for the prestigious École Navale, the French naval academy, but failed and instead became apprenticed to a boiler maker. He later joined the French Navy, becoming a non-commissioned officer of mechanical engineering aboard the battleship Jean Bart. In April 1919, the Jean Bart and another dreadnought, the France, were sent to the Black Sea as part of the French-led Southern Russia intervention to assist the White Russians in the Russian Civil War.

== Black Sea mutiny ==
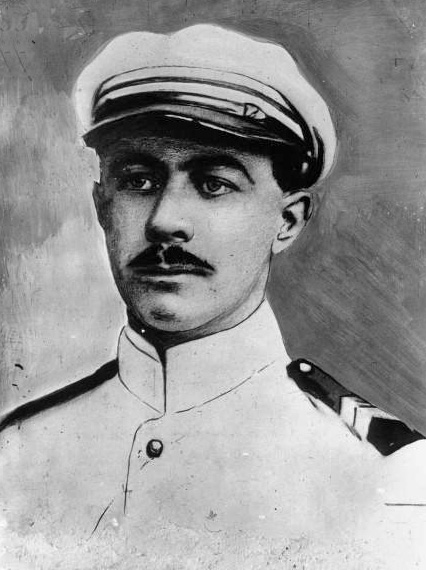
Marty in 1921

On 19 April 1919, the crews of the battleships Jean Bart (commander, capitaine de vaisseau du Couedic de Kerérant) and France (commanded by Vice-Admiral Jean-Françoise-Charles Amet) mutinied. Although their sympathies lay with the Reds and not with the Whites, the crews' primary grievances were: (i) the slow rate of their demobilisation (following the end of World War I) and (ii) the small quantity and atrocious quality of the rations. The French government acceded to the mutineers' demands but pursued the ringleaders. (Amongst these was Charles Tillon, with whom Marty was to have a life-long association.) With the passage of time, Marty's precise role is unclear. He was nevertheless duly arrested, tried, and sentenced to twenty years imprisonment at hard labour by a court-martial held in Constantinople in July 1919.

== PCF membership ==
In any event, Marty was pardoned, and on his release in 1923, he immediately joined the PCF. By all accounts, he was a charismatic character, and his role in the Black Sea Mutiny did nothing to diminish his aura. He was elected, in 1924, to the French National Assembly for the constituency of Seine-et-Oise and became a member of the PCF Central Committee.

In the meantime, following the lead of numerous other Communist leaders, he campaigned against rising French militarism, being arrested and imprisoned in Paris's La Santé Prison. In 1931, he became active in the Comintern, and by 1936, he had been elected to both its Praesidium (executive council) and Secretariat (administration).

== Spanish Civil War ==
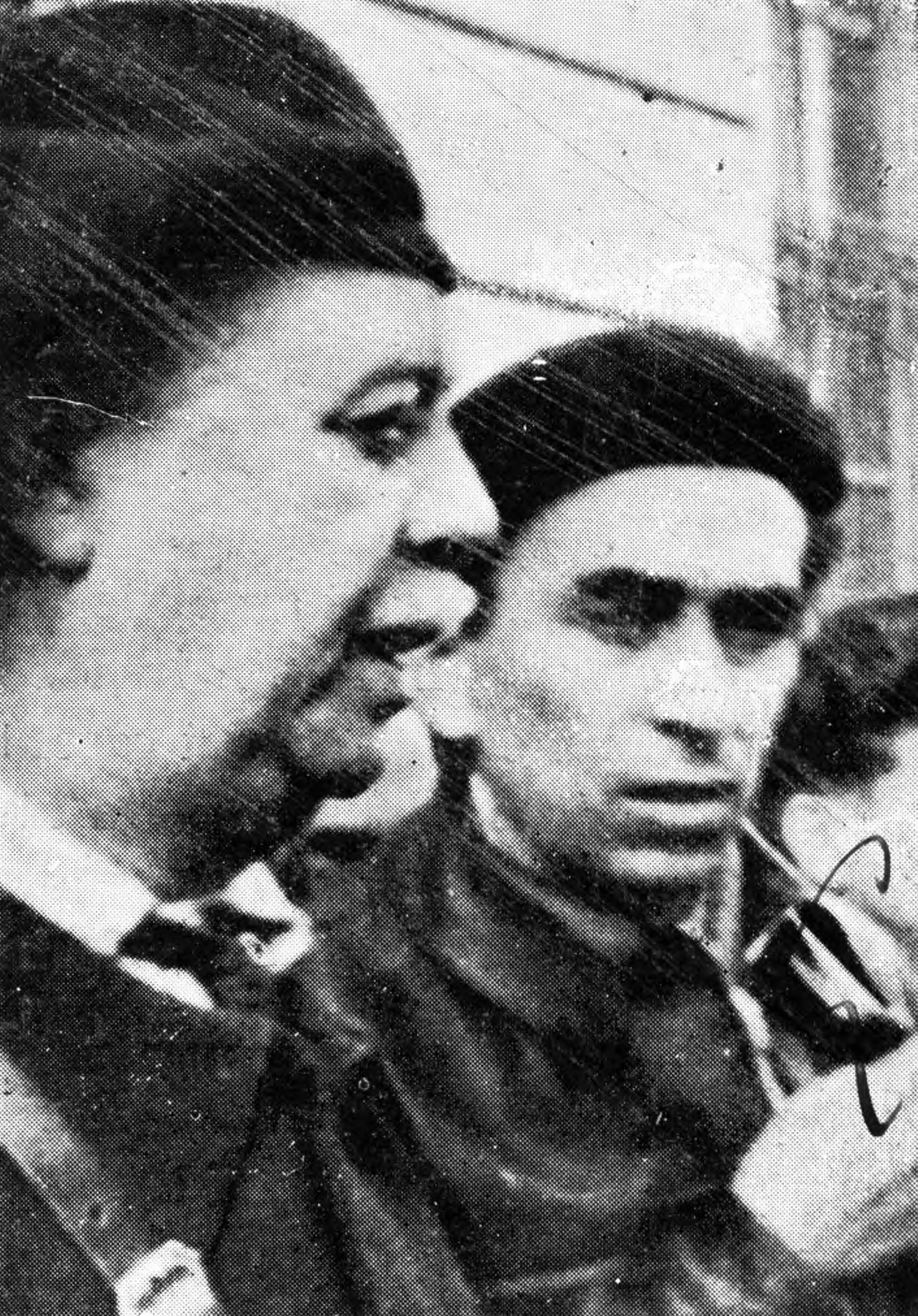
Marty (left) and Luigi Longo in Spain, 1937

In 1936, at the outbreak of the Spanish Civil War, he was sent to Spain to represent Comintern interests. That October, he was appointed Political Commissar ("chief organiser") of the International Brigades, operating from the Brigade headquarters and training base in Albacete. A Franco-Belgian battalion in the XII International Brigade was named after him.

Marty was a strict disciplinarian, ready to execute his men for loss of resolve or ideological soundness. He also developed a tendency to see fifth columnists everywhere. These qualities earned him the title of the "Butcher of Albacete". Later, "Marty... admitted that he had ordered the shooting of about 500 Brigaders,(sic) nearly one-tenth of the total killed in the war, but some question this figure".

In a report in November 1937, a Comintern member and the head of the Italian Communist Party, Palmiro Togliatti, insisted that he should "change radically his working methods" and "refrain from intervening in military and technical matters affecting the Brigades".

By April 1938, Spanish communist leaders wanted the replacement of many International Brigade commanders due to poor performance, and although Marty disagreed, he had to compromise and General Walter and Vladimir Ćopić were replaced.

== World War II ==
In the spring of 1939, the Spanish Civil War ended. Instead of returning to France, Marty went to the Soviet Union to work full-time for the Comintern. He was still there when World War II started. Despite the German-Soviet pact, as an active and very prominent Communist, it was far too dangerous for him to return to Nazi-occupied France. From May to October 1943, after the success of Operation Torch (a key component of the Allied North African campaign), Marty was sent to Algiers. He served as the PCF's official representative with Charles de Gaulle's Free French Forces, which were based there.

After the Liberation of Paris, in August 1944, Marty returned to France. He attempted to take advantage of the chaos that prevailed during the early days of de Gaulle's Provisional Government by starting a revolution. However, it failed to generate support either from other PCF leaders or from the rank and file. Marty's efforts ended when Soviet premier Joseph Stalin vetoed the plan.

== Postwar ==
Marty was once again elected to the National Assembly after the war, though high profile attacks in the press (many by men formerly under his command) had greatly diminished his influence within the party.

His career effectively ended when Étienne Fajon, a prominent Communist deputy and a minor press baron, denounced Marty and his former comrade from Black Sea Mutiny days Charles Tillon as police spies. The Affaire Marty-Tillon, as it became known, dragged on for several months with many accusations and counteraccusations from both sides. It ended with Marty's expulsion from the PCF on 7 December 1952.

Fajon's accusations were almost certainly false. It is likely that in a swiftly changing political climate, with the Cold War rapidly heating up, Marty had simply become a political liability. He wrote an account of "L'affaire Marty", which was published in Paris in 1955.

Marty remained a deputy until 1955 when he retired to a village near Toulouse. He died of lung cancer on 23 November 1956.

== Other people's impressions ==
[He was] a squat figure with a white moustache, drooping jowl and oversized beret. The heroic legend woven around him in Party mythology made him one of the most powerful figures in the Comintern. Almost nobody dared challenge his authority.

He was a sharp, imperious-looking man, and looked capable of performing all the actions Hemingway and others have written about... he appeared to be vigorous, thrusting and bore evidence of long years of struggle.

A conference was called by the Chief Political Commissar - Andre Marty, a Frenchman who had been the leader of the Mutiny of the French Black Sea Fleet after the 1914-18 war. He took a liking to me, I assume because I also, to his mind, had led a Naval mutiny.

He had first made his name as the leader of a naval mutiny in the Black Sea ... He may have been a great chap in his day, but in Spain he was both a sinister and a ludicrous figure. He was a large, fat man with a bushy moustache and always wore a huge, black beret - looking like a caricature of an old-fashioned French petty bougeois. There is no doubt he was quite literally mad at this time. He always spoke in a hysterical roar, he suspected everyone of treason, or worse, listened to advice from nobody, ordered executions on little or no pretext - in short, he was a real menace.

== In literature ==
Andrè Marty is mentioned in Ernest Hemingway's novel For Whom the Bell Tolls in chapter 42.

He also figures in the first volume of Peter Weiss's novel The Aesthetics of Resistance.

In the introduction to Orwell In Spain, his behaviour towards non-Communist Party pro-Republican forces is characterised by Christopher Hitchens as "coldly hateful".

Marty is a character in the 2022 novel published in Spain by Lola Alemany De Color de Amapola 978-84-18756-64-1. This novel recreates the life of three women working as translator-interpreters for the Marty and International Brigades in Albacete.
