= Charles Tillon =

French metal worker, Communist, and leader of the French Resistance

Charles Joseph Tillon
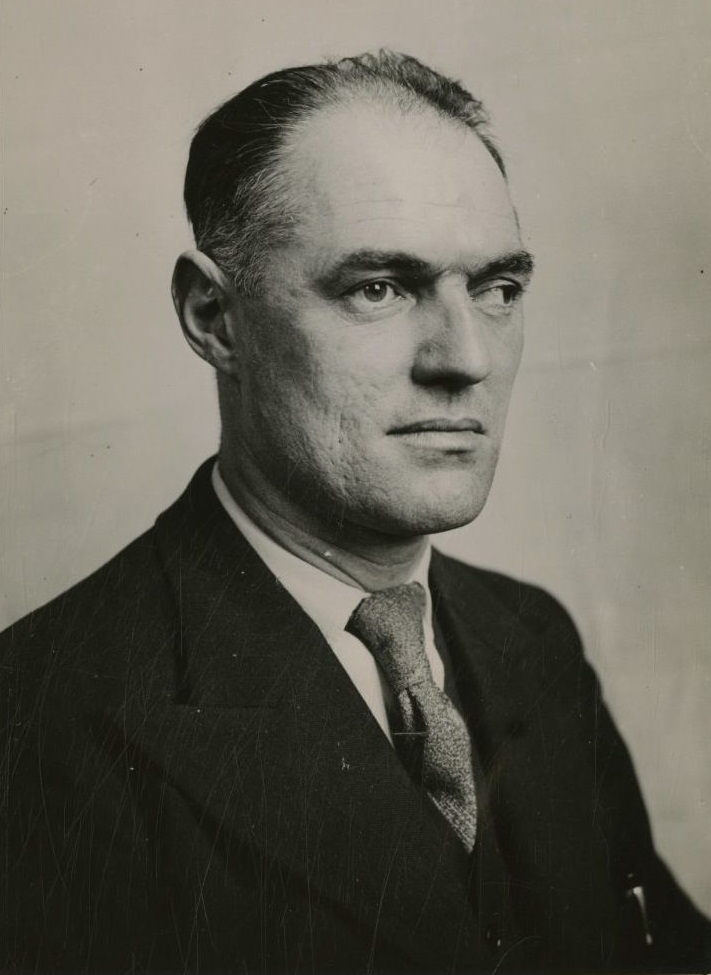
- Charles Tillon in 1936

Minister of Air
- In office 10 September 1944 – 21 November 1945
- Preceded by: Fernand Grenier (Commissaire)
- Succeeded by: André Maroselli

Minister of Armaments
- In office 21 November 1945 – 16 December 1946
- Preceded by: Jean Monnet
- Succeeded by: Maurice Bourgès-Maunoury

Minister of Reconstruction and Urban Development
- In office 22 January 1947 – 4 May 1947
- Preceded by: René Schmitt
- Succeeded by: Jules Moch (interim)

Personal details
- Born: 3 July 1897 Rennes, France
- Died: 13 January 1993 (aged 95) Marseille, France
- Occupation: Metal worker, trade union leader

Charles Joseph Tillon (3 July 1897 – 13 January 1993) was a French metal worker, Communist, trade union leader, politician and leader of the French Resistance during World War II (1939–1945).

Tillon was born into a working-class family and trained as a metal worker. During World War I (1914–18) he was conscripted into the navy. He was a leader in a naval mutiny in 1919, and was sentenced to five years hard labor. Released after two years, he returned to factory work. He became active in the French Communist Party and in the trade union movement, rising to senior positions in both. In 1936, he was elected a Deputy in the National Legislature. He lost this position when the Communist Party was outlawed early in 1940, and went underground. After the German occupation of France in June 1940, Tillon became one of the three leaders of the Communist Party and head of the Communist armed Resistance forces. Following the war he was again elected a deputy, and between 1944 and 1946 was in turn Minister of Air, Minister of Armaments, and Minister of Reconstruction and Town Planning.

== Early years ==
Tillon was born in Rennes in the Ille-et-Vilaine department on 3 July 1897 to a working-class family. He apprenticed in metallurgy at the Rennes vocational school until 1913, then found work as a fitter. During World War I (1914–18), he was drafted into the navy in 1916, and assigned to the cruiser Guichen, which carried troops to the east. He became a quartermaster and was one of the leaders of the mutiny aboard the Guichen, Jean Bart and France, on the Black Sea, on 26 June 1919. He was arrested in Greece, tried by a military court in Brest and sentenced to five years of hard labor, part of which he served in the Dar Bel Hamri Penitentiary in Morocco.

Tillon was released following a general pardon in 1921. Tillon returned to Rennes and worked as a fitter in different factories making agricultural machinery and chemical products. He joined the French Communist Party, and was active in the Confédération générale du travail unitaire (CGTU) trade union movement. He organized the local metalworkers union, became secretary of the departmental union, then secretary of the regional union of unitary trade unions.

Tillon initiated the successful 1924–25 strike of the sardine packers of Douarnenez. (Note: Douarnenez in Brittany had twenty sardine canneries and a factory that made the cans. The town government was dominated by the SFIC, which followed the line of the Bloc ouvrier et paysan and was opposed to the Cartel des gauches. The strike of the sardine canners (sardinières) followed local and national agitation against the harsh working conditions and low wages. Charles Tillon, at the time sectretary of the UD-CGTU of Ille-et-Vilaine, sent Maurice Simonin and Lucie Colliard to the site. The strike began in one cannery on 20 November 1924, and spread to the others when a strike committee was formed. The Communist mayor supported the strikers and was suspended from office for "obstructing the freedom to work. The strike made the headlines of the national press. Scabs were brought in, protected by police, and violence broke out. On 8 January 1925 the cannery owners gave in to the strikers' demands. In February 1925, Colliard published a brochure that described the struggle and served as a guide for other workers.)

In 1925, Tillon was elected a municipal Councillor of Douarnenez. In 1928, Tillon was made head of the regional union of Nantes unions. In 1930, he was appointed to the secretariat of the unitary federation of chemical products in Paris. He entered the central committee of the party in 1932 and was made a member of the Politburo. In 1934, he was assigned to reorganizing the unitary federation of harbors, docks and transport. On 26 May 1935, Tillon was elected General Councillor of the Seine for the canton of Aubervilliers. In the parliamentary elections of 1936 he was elected deputy of the Seine for the third district of Saint-Denis. In the Chamber of Deputies, he was vice-president of the merchant marine committee, and for the last two years of his term, he was on the insurance and social welfare committee. He called for action against politicians who had fraudulently enriched themselves during their mandate.

During the Spanish Civil War (1936–39), Tillon raised questions on the treatment of Spanish refugees and on the delivery of gold to General Francisco Franco that had been deposited with the Bank of France by the Spanish government. He traveled to Spain and was taken prisoner in Alicante in April 1939 with the last remaining Republican leaders.

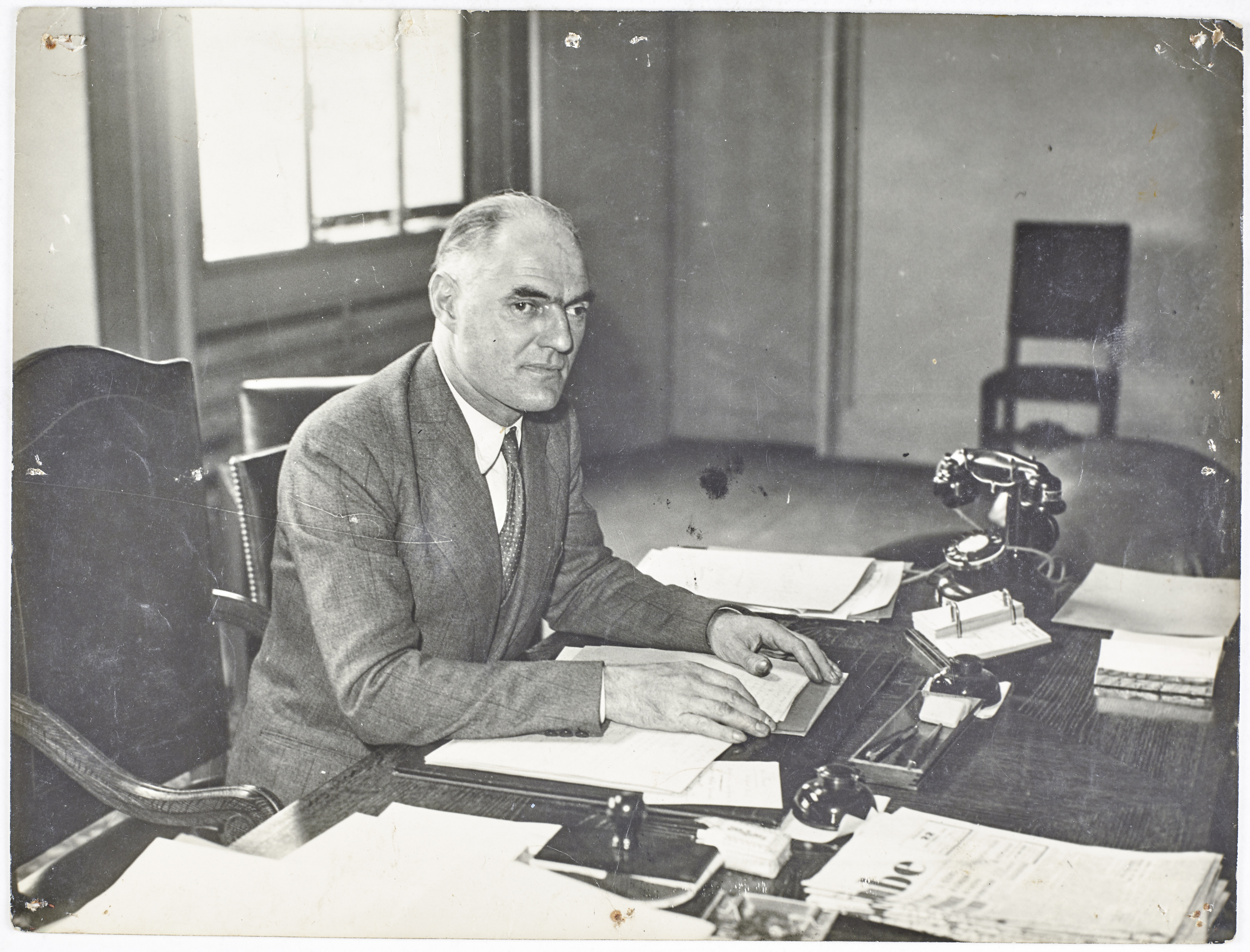
Charles Tillon in 1940

== World War II ==
Tillon lost his mandate in the chamber of deputies when the law of 2 January 1940 outlawed the party. He remained loyal to the party and went underground. He was one of the nine Communist deputies who avoided arrest but was sentenced in absentia to five years in prison. He reorganized the party in the southwestern departments both before and after the German occupation of France. After the armistice of 22 June 1940 Tillon took a different line from the other PCF leaders, who denounced the imperialist war, called for peace, and concentrated on opposition to the Vichy government. Instead, in public statements in June and July 1940, Tillon spoke out for fighting for national liberation from the Germans. He became the third member of the clandestine PCF secretariat, with Jacques Duclos and Benoît Frachon.

Germany attacked the Soviet Union on 22 June 1941 in Operation Barbarossa. PCF policy switched to support for armed struggle against the German occupiers. Tillon was put in charge of military matters. Rather than limit armed action to Communists, it was decided to create a non-Communist organization, the Francs-Tireurs et Partisans Français (FTPF), under the Front national. It was the mass organization of the PCF even if it was theoretically independent of the PCF. The National Military Committee of the FTP was set up in March–April 1942, headed by Tillon, who thus became the leader of the Communist resistance. Duclos became effective leader of the party, but in theory, Tillon and Frachon shared authority.

== Later political career ==
Tillon remained a Communist leader after the Liberation of France and played an important role in politics as mayor, deputy and then minister. In 1944, Tillon was made temporary head of the municipality of Aubervilliers. He became mayor after the municipal elections of April–May 1945 and was reelected in 1947. He was also named a member of the Provisional Consultative Assembly, resuming the seat he had won in 1936. Charles de Gaulle wanted a representative of the Communist Resistance in his cabinet. Tillon was Air Minister under de Gaulle from 10 September 1944 to 21 November 1945. In October 1945, he was elected a member of the Constituent Assembly for the 6th district of the Seine. He was Minister of Armaments from 21 November 1945 to 20 January 1946. Tillon remained Minister of Armaments under the governments of Félix Gouin and Georges Bidault from 23 January to 16 December 1946. In the government of Paul Ramadier, he was Minister of Reconstruction and Urbanism from 22 January 1947 to 4 May 1947.

Tillon remained a loyal member of the central committee, political bureau and secretariat of the party. After the communist ministers were dismissed from Ramadier's government he and Laurent Casanova were made responsible for the PCF's military policy. Tillon was in charge of the "Fight for Peace" section. In 1947, Tillon lost his wife, Colette with whom he had two sons, Claude (1928) and Jacques (1942). In 1951, he married Raymonde Barbé with whom he had two children, Itea (1950) and Nadia (1952). Tillon was reelected to the Assembly in 1951.

== Last years ==
At a meeting of the party secretariat on 26 May 1952, André Marty was accused of opposition to the party line. On 1 September 1952, Marty was accused of factional activity, and Tillon was said to represent the other half of the faction. On 7 December 1952, the Central Committee threw Marty out of the party and deprived Tillon of all responsibilities. The purge seems to have been associated with Stalin's purge of "nationalists" in the Eastern European Soviet satellites. Tillon was accused of supporting them, a charge he denied. He retained his party membership.

In June 1970, Tillon coauthored a paper titled "It is no longer possible to remain silent" with Roger Garaudy, Maurice Kriegel-Valrimont and Jean Pronteau. The paper condemned the party's policy during the upheavals in Czechoslovakia and France in 1968, the "normalization" in Czechoslovakia in January 1970 and the suppression of the extreme left. Tillon was thrown out of the PCF.

Later, he concentrated on writing his memoirs, published as On chantait rouge ("We Sang Red") in 1977. Tillon was made a Commander of the Legion of Honour. He died in 1993 in Marseille at age 95.

== Government functions ==
Tillon held the following ministerial posts during the French Fourth Republic:

- Air minister of the first government of Charles de Gaulle (from 10 September 1944 to 21 November 1945)
- Armaments minister of the second government of Charles de Gaulle (from 21 November 1945 to 26 January 1946)
- Armaments minister of the government of Félix Gouin (from 26 January 1945 to 24 June 1946)
- Armaments minister of the first government of Georges Bidault (from 24 June 1946 to 16 December 1946)
- Minister of Reconstruction and Town Planning of the first government of Paul Ramadier (from 22 January 1947 to 4 May 1947)

== Publications ==
- Tillon, Charles; Cachin, Marcel (1946). La vérité sur l'insurrection nationale. Association des anciens Franc-tireurs et partisans français. p. 31.
- Tillon, Charles (1946). Bilan d'une année de travail et tâches d'avenir de l'aviation française. Impr. "L'Élan". p. 37.
- Tillon, Charles (1946). Les usines d'armement et la reconstruction de la France: de l'économie de guerre à l'économie de paix. France d'Abord. p. 30.
- Thorez, Maurice; Marty, André; Tillon, Charles (1948). Où en est l'aviation française ?: par Maurice Thorez, André Marty, Charles Tillon. Extraits des interventions des élus communistes à l'Assemblée nationale les 22, 23, 24 et 25 juin 1948. [Préface de Gaston Monmousseau.]. Editions du Parti communiste français. p. 68.
- Bloch, Jean Richard; Tillon, Charles (1949). De la France trahie à la France en armes: commentaires à Radio-Moscou 1941 - 1944. Éd. sociales. p. 554.
- Marty, André; Tillon, Charles (1949). Comment empêcher les licenciements, la riposte à l'attaque du gouvernement contre les usines d'aviation: Intervention à l'Assemblée nationale, 28 juin 1949... [Les Travailleurs le sauront, par Charles Tillon.]. Fédération de la Seine du Parti communiste français. p. 29.
- Tillon, Charles (1952). L'Union soviétique, rempart de la démocratie de la paix: Conférence faite devant les membres des comités de section et les secrétaries des celules locales et d'entreprise de la Fédération des Bouches-du-Rhône du Parti communiste français, à Marseille, le 4 mars 1951. Parti communiste français. p. 47.
- Tillon, Charles; Godart, Julien (1951). Pages de gloire des vingt-trois; Préf. de Justin Godart; Postf. de Charles Tillon. Immigration. p. 203.
- Tillon, Charles (1952). Marcel Bloch, 14 juin 1881-28 octobre 1951. [Allocution de Charles Tillon. Témoignages de Raymond Tournemaine et H. Beaumont.]. impr. de Chantenay. p. 19.
- Tillon, Charles (1962). Les F.T.P. Témoignage Pour Servir À L'histoire de la Résistance.
- Tillon, Charles (1966). Les F. T. P. La guérilla en France: Nouv. Julliard, Union générale d'éditions. p. 443.
- Tillon, Charles (1971). Un " procès de Moscou " à Paris. Paris: Seuil.
- Tillon, Charles (1972). La Révolte vient de loin. Union générale d'éditions. p. 445.
- Tillon, Charles (1972). les FTP. with a foreword by Duclos, Jacques. Geneva: Crémille.
- Tillon, Charles (1977). On chantait rouge. Paris: Robert Laffont.
- Tillon, Charles (1983). Le laboureur et la Republique. A. Fayard. p. 310. ISBN 978-2-213-02142-3.

== Sources ==
- "Charles, Joseph TILLON". Base de données des députés français depuis 1789. French National Assembly.
- Jolly, Jean (1977). "TILLON, Charles, Joseph". Dictionnaire des parlementaires français de 1889 à 1940 (in French).
- Vigreux, Jean (2014-05-24). "La grève des sardinières de Douarnenez (Finistère) en 1924 : une grève communiste ?". Paprik@2F (in French).
