= Convoi des 31000 =

Deportation transport in 1943 with women resistants from Compiègne to Auschwitz

The Convoi des 31000 or Convoy of the 31000s was a deportation convoy that left Romainville, France, for Auschwitz Concentration Camp on 24 January 1943. The women who were transported were mostly Communist Party members or Resistance fighters. Its name stemmed from the fact that the women were assigned numbers between 31625 and 31854 when they reached Auschwitz. It was the only convoy to transport women of the French Resistance to Auschwitz. Out of 230 women who arrived at the concentration camp, only 49 survived their ordeal. A number of women from the convoy testified against the Nazis after the war, wrote autobiographies, were awarded the Legion of Honour or were decreed to be Righteous Among the Nations.

== Background ==
In 1941 Otto von Stülpnagel introduced the Night and Fog directive (Nacht und Nebel) which provided for deporting "enemies of the Reich" to the eastern territories in order to isolate them from the rest of the world, forbidding them to make any communications with their families. For the Germans, the directive was designed to alarm the families involved and dissuade them from continuing their relatives' work in the Resistance. This can be seen in a letter from Heinrich Himmler to members of the Gestapo: "After careful consideration, the will of the Führer is to modify the measures against those who are guilty of crimes against the Reich or against the German forces in the occupied territories. Our Führer believes that a prison sentence or hard labour for life sends a message of weakness. The only possible deterrent is either the death penalty or something that will leave the family and the rest of the population in doubt as to the fate of the criminal. Deportation to Germany will fulfil this purpose."

Over the months, this practice was used against French people who were suspected of espionage, treason, aiding enemies of the Reich or illegal possession of weapons – all accusations which were liable for the death penalty.

== Journey ==
=== Detention ===
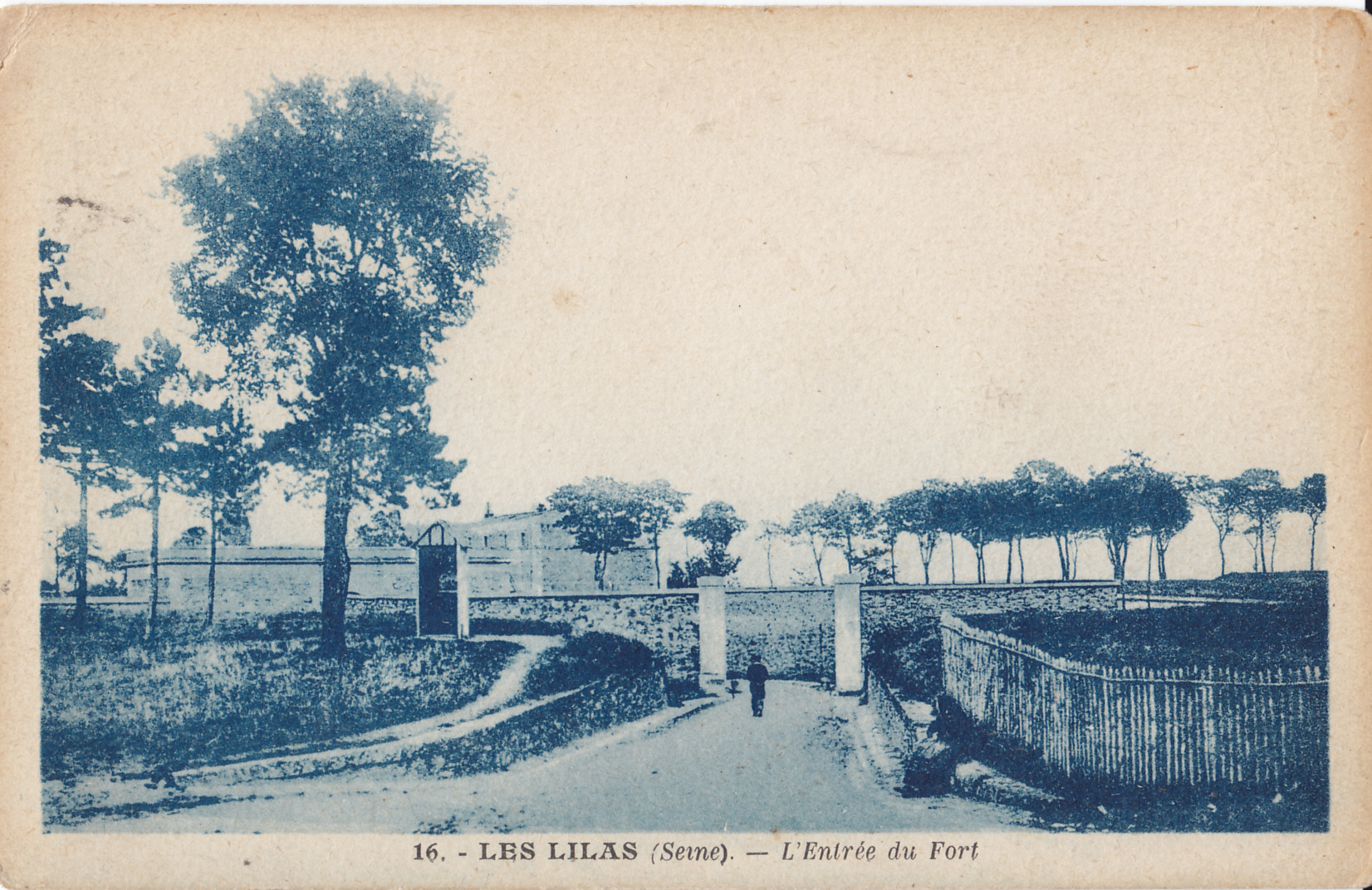
The entrance to Fort Romainville during the interwar period

Those waiting to be deported were imprisoned at Fort Romainville, a former prison which was commandeered by Nazi forces in 1940 for use as a transit camp. One of the first women in the convoy to arrive at the camp was Maria Alonso, a Spaniard, who was arrested for providing a mimeograph machine to resistance fighters. Alonso was appointed head of the Women's Section. Ten days later, she was joined by the young women involved in printing and distributing communist propaganda under Arthur Tintelin. They included Madeleine Doiret, Jacqueline Quatremaire, Lucienne Thevenin, Jeanne Serre and Vittoria Daubeuf. On 24 August, the women caught during the Politzer-Pican-Dallidet raid in Paris arrived, including Madeleine Dissoubray, Marie-Claude Vaillant-Couturier, Danielle Casanova, Charlotte Delbo and Madeleine Passot, as well as a young girl of sixteen, Rosa Floch, arrested for having written “Vive les Anglais” on the wall of her school.

The inmates set up a system of pooling food packages to improve each other's rations in view of their widespread hunger. Danielle Casanova convinced some of the women whose windows faced the street to shout about their poor provisioning. This forced the director of the camp to improve their food. Casanova and Germaine Pican were sent to the dungeon for this action, but the soup the women were given did become more substantial. Another inmate, Marie Politzer, organized gymnastics sessions and cold showers every morning to keep the women fit.

A newsletter, gleaned from listening to the guards, cooks and new arrivals, circulated in the prison. Written in methylene blue on the wrapping paper of Red Cross parcels, it was titled Le Patriote de Romainville. The testimonies of women such as Madeleine Passot and Madeleine Dissoubray show that the internees felt they were a “team” and did not have to “make friends” because they were all closely connected. As in other prison camps, theatre became important for the women: Charlotte Delbo directed plays and Cécile Charua made the costumes. After the Sunday midday meal, "Artistic afternoons" were organized, attracting some German guards and the male detainees. One of the last women to reach Romainville was Georgette Rostaing, who had been arrested on 3 January 1943.

=== Departure ===
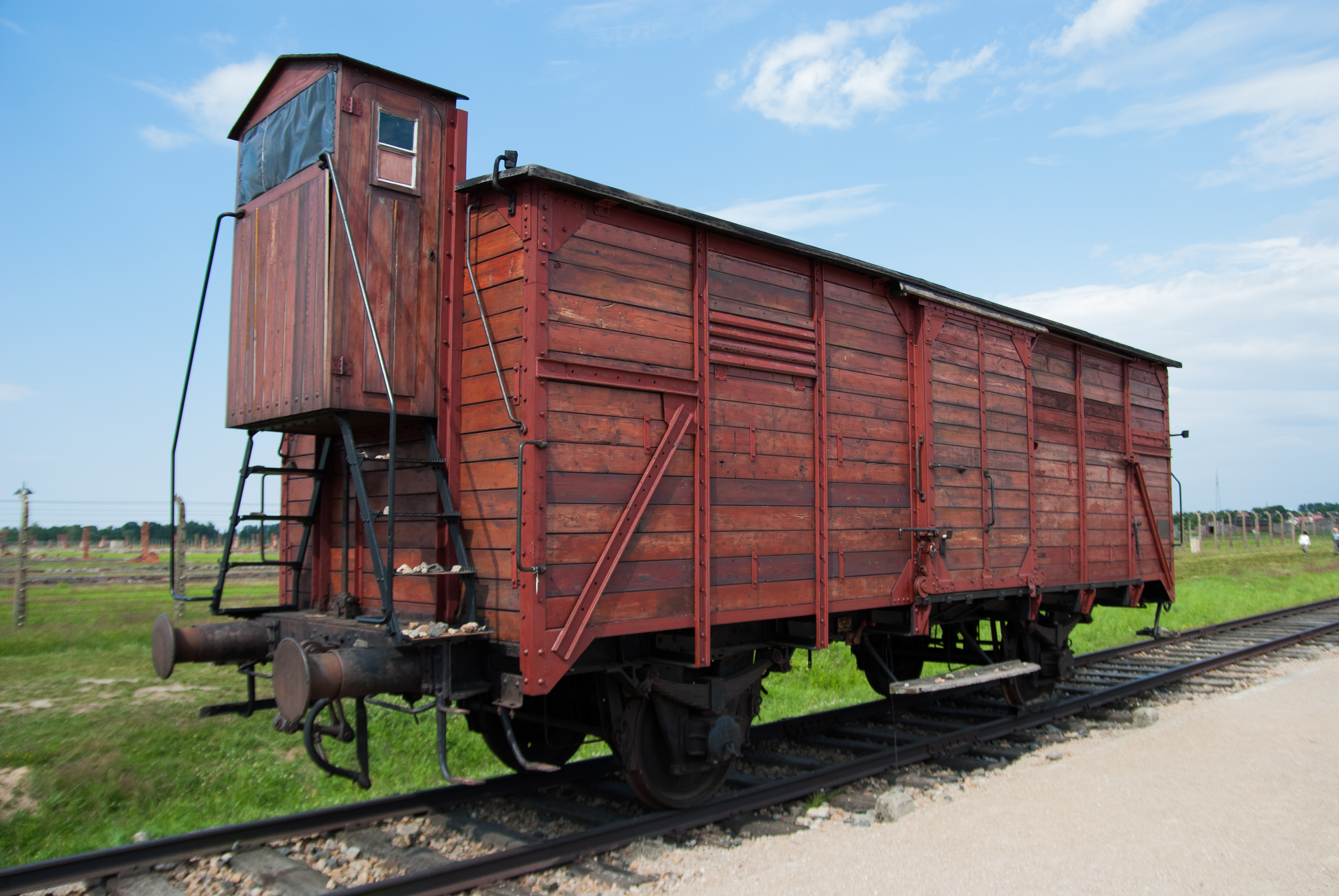
Car of a freight train used for the Holocaust Trains now on display at Auschwitz transformed into a memorial site.

On the evening of 22 January 1943, all the women in the fort were gathered together and 222 of them are called forward. They were told that they would need only one small suitcase and warm clothes for their departure. Although the women did not know their final destination, they were apparently not afraid, as they believed being sent to work in a factory in Germany could not be worse than the cells of the Gestapo.

On 24 January, the 230 women were taken to the Compiègne freight station and loaded into the last four cattle trucks. The front part of the train had been occupied by 1,446 men since the day before. For the trip, they were given a loaf of bread and a 10 cm piece of sausage each. In the crowded cattle trucks, the women set up a rotation system: half of them sitting, the others lying down and vice versa, their suitcases stacked around them. At each stop along the journey, they stuck notes through the doors hoping they would be picked up and delivered. On the first day, the train stopped at Châlons sur Marne where a railway worker whispered to them through the doors: "They are beaten. They lost Stalingrad. You will be back soon. Courage, dears." When the wagons reached Halle-sur-Salle, the men's trucks were separated from the women's. The women were sent on to Auschwitz, the men to Sachsenhausen. During one of the stops, a German guard cried out: "Enjoy it. You are on your way to a camp from which you will never return." At Breslau station, they were given a lukewarm drink and their first food since their departure. They finally arrived at Auschwitz on the morning of 27 January.

=== Auschwitz ===
==== The first few days ====
Badges like this design, which was intended for Polish prisoners, were similar to the badge Convoi des 31000 were forced to wear.

On 27 January 1943, the 230 women entered Auschwitz-Birkenau concentration camp singing La Marseillaise. Taken into a shed, some refused to drink the thin porridge given to them, complaining about the smell of the red enamel bowls they had been given. They learned later that these bowls had previously been used by owners who suffered from dysentery to relieve themselves at night. During the first day, Danielle Casanova volunteered to become the new camp dentist, at the request of the SS. The position allowed her to find similar work also for Maï Politzer and Betty Langlois. After Casanova's departure, the other women were forced to undress to return all their personal items before being taken to a second room where they had their hair cut, their pubic hair shaved, and their bodies disinfected with a cloth soaked in gasoline. After a steam bath, they were tattooed on the inside of their arms, with numbers ranging from 31,625 to 31,854. It was these numbers with gave the deportation the name "Convoy of the 31000s". Wearing prisoners' clothes that did not fit, the 230 members of the convoy sewed an F on a pink triangle on their uniform – F for French and the pink triangle for political deportees.

Soon afterwards, the group was sent to Block 14 for two weeks in quarantine. During quarantine, the women were not required to work but had to attend roll calls, standing in the snow for hours. Madeleine Dissoubray recalled later that they tried to protect each other from the cold, putting the weakest in the middle to try to keep them warm. The first to die were the oldest: Marie Grabb, a 63-year-old resistance fighter from the Tours region, who died before the roll call on the first day; Léona "Nanna" Bouillard, 57 year old who could not be revived after falling during the second call. While in quarantine, several others died: Léa Lambert; Suzanne Costentin who was beaten to death by a guard; and Yvonne Cavé who died of frostbite after her shoes were stolen.

==== 'The Race' ====
On 10 February, an event took place which became known to survivors as 'The Race'. After spending the day standing in the snow, the 15,000 women in the camp are forced to run past the doctors and guards who made a "selection" from the weaker women, in what some consider an act of revenge on the part of the German SS, after the victory of the Soviets at Stalingrad. Fourteen women from the Convoi des 31000 were killed, including Sophie Brabander, Sophie Gigand and Aminthe Guillon, whilst Alice Viterbo spent several weeks in Block 25 before dying.

==== Life in the concentration camp ====
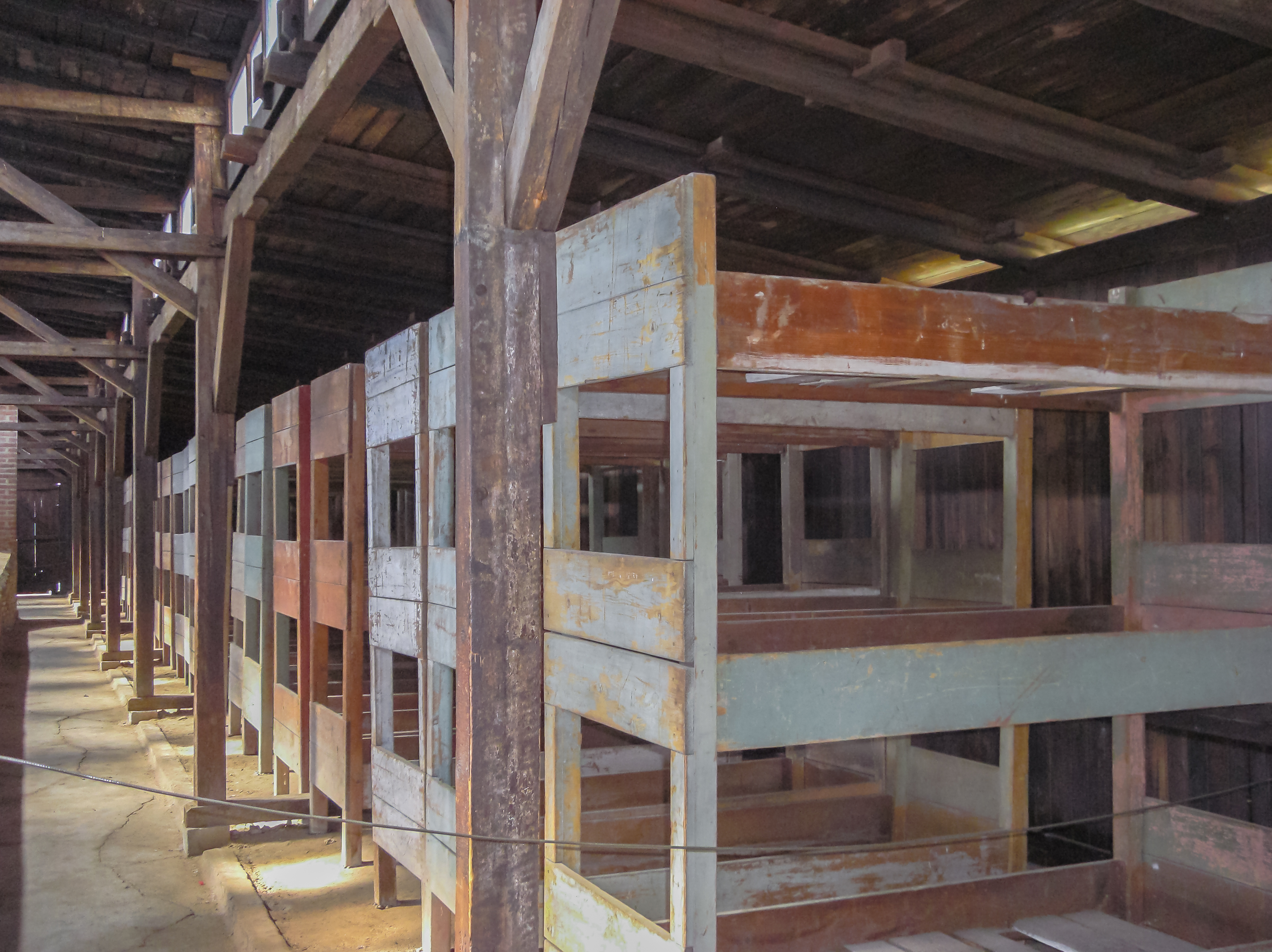
Interior of a cell block in Auschwitz

On 12 February, the women were sent to Block 26. The following day after walking in the snow for two hours, the women are tasked with clearing a field with shovels, as part of the Birkenau Camp's expansion. For sustenance they received half a litre of black coffee in the morning, thickened water as a soup at noon and 300g of bread in the evening, sometimes with margarine, jam, sausage or cheese. Several women died, including: Berthe Lapeyrade, who refused to get up after falling in a swamp and was beaten to death; Alice Varailhon, shot by a guard; Annette Epaud, who was sent to Block 25 then to the gas chamber because she gave water to an inmate who was thirsty.

In Spring 1943 a typhus epidemic broke out, ravaging the camp. Several of the French women died. The first was Raymonde Sergent in March, then Maï Politzer a few days later. Rosa Floch, youngest in the convoy, then Andrée Tamisé, whose health had already been weakened by dysentery, and finally Claudine Guérin, who lost her mind because of the fever. Élisabeth Le Port died on 14 March 1943. By 10 April 1943, there were only 70 left. On 1 May, Danielle Casanova fell ill and, despite being vaccinated by the SS doctors, died of typhoid nine days later.

==== Sub-camp Raisko ====
Shortly after their arrival, five women from the convoy – Madeleine Dechavassine, Marie-Élisa Nordmann-Cohen, Hélène Solomon-Langevin, Laure Gatet and Alice Loeb – were sent to work in the Raisko Sub-camp. This camp was responsible for the production of kok-saghiz, a dandelion with latex in its root, which was used to create rubber. Located outside the camp, Raisko was an old school surrounded by fields and greenhouses. It was run by an SS officer who was afraid of contagion and allowed women to be clean and remain in relatively good health. Those who were most qualified in chemistry were assigned to the laboratory to do experiments, whilst others worked in the fields, took care of the plants or helped the chemists. It was one of the least dangerous sub-camps of Auschwitz-Birkenau.

At the start of the summer, Marie-Claude Vaillant Couturier overheard that the Frenchwomen were to be transferred to Ravensbrück. At the end of April, Emmanuel Fleury, Marie-Thérèse Fleury's husband, heard from the Resistance that his wife had died. A telegram had been sent to the French Resistance in London and broadcast on the BBC's Radio Londres. Around that time, the families of the deportees sent letters to the French Red Cross and to the government to ask for news of their loved ones following several other death notices arriving in France. On 17 August Radio Londres reported on the detention conditions of the Communist women, who had been transferred from Romainville to Auschwitz. When it was stated that there was only one tap for 5,000 women, the reporters thought it was a mistake and corrected it to one tap for 500 women. Following these events – although no document has been found to prove it – the women in the Raisko sub-camp were allowed to write a letter in German to their French-speaking families.

The women at Raisko from Convoy 31000 also discovered that there were 37 others in Auschwitz-Birkenau who were still alive.

=== Transfer to Ravensbrück ===
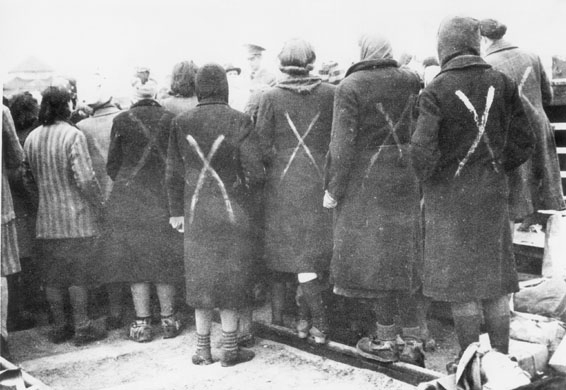
Female prisoners in Ravensbrück with white crosses on their clothes.

On 7 January 1944, 10 women from the Raisko sub-camp were transferred to Ravensbrück. On their arrival, after a shower and a gynaecological examination, they received new outfits taken from the luggage of deportees and painted with large white crosses on the front and back. The new arrivals were sent to sew German military uniforms; if their daily quota was not reached, they were beaten by one of the guards. One member of their tight-knit group, Marie-Jeanne Pennec was transferred alone to Czechoslovakia. On 4 August 1944, members of the convoy who had been in quarantine at Auschwitz since the previous year, also arrived at Ravensbrück. Several members of the original convoy were placed in Block 32 among them, Marie-Élise Nordmann-Cohen, Marie-Claude Vaillant-Couturier and Adélaïde Hautval. This cell block accommodated prisoners, mainly Polish, who had survived experiments inflicted on them by Dr Karl Gebhardt.

A few weeks later, the women experienced their greatest fear: separation. One group, composed of Cécile Charua, Poupette Alizon, Carmen and Lucienne Thévenin and Gilberte Tamisé are put in a deportation convoy to Beendorf, a factory manufacturing V1 and V2 missiles located in a former salt mine 600m deep. There, they performed small acts of sabotage: not tightening the screws, making holes too big, putting salt in the grease or even dropping the most fragile parts to break them. Shortly after their departure, Hélène Solomon-Langevin was sent, alone, as a nurse to a Bosch factory near Berlin.

The advance of the Red Army meant that deportees from camps further east were moved west to Ravensbrück, which became increasingly overcrowded. As a result, the Jugendlager – a converted former annex camp – was opened to serve as a death centre for women too weak to work. Adélaïde Hautval and other doctor prisoners were responsible for listing the women to be sent there, but later tried to save them. During this period, Germaine Tillion and Marie-Claude Vaillant-Couturier began to make notes about the camp and their detention. They wrote in handwriting so small that it was almost illegible with the naked eye.

On 2 March 1943, 585 women including 33 French women were put in a convoy to Mauthausen, an old medieval fortress which had been converted into a camp in 1938 and was located near Linz in Austria. They arrived there on the 7 March, having been forced to march the final distance without food. The women were sent to clear the tracks at Amstetten station. Three of the women from the original convoy, Charlotte Decock, Olga Melin and Yvonne Noutari, died in the bombing on 21 March. On 22 April 1945, the 30 survivors of Mauthausen from the original 230 members of the convoy of women from the French Resistance were summoned and learned that the Red Cross had arrived to evacuate them.

=== Liberation ===
On 25 January 1945, the Red Army entered Auschwitz and freed the prisoners who had been abandoned by the guards. Among them was Marie-Jeanne Bauer, the only Frenchwoman from the convoy of 24 January 1943 still there. A few days after the liberation, she was shot by a drunk Soviet soldier. The bullet grazed her aorta before coming out through her shoulder blade but she survived. The first to be released, she was the last to return to France on 15 July 1945.

At the Oranienbourg camp, Hélène Solomon was put on a death march that lasted 12 days, until it was finally abandoned by the SS. Alongside other French women, she left the column and met soldiers who put them in a truck on its way to Lille, where the French Red Cross awaited them. She weighed just 35kg.

The five from Beendorf were transferred to the Neuengamme camp on 10 April, along with 5,000 other prisoners. The trip lasted 12 days, interrupted by stops caused by Allied bombing. When they arrived, the SS and their prisoners discovered that the camp had been abandoned. They were joined there by Madeleine Doiret who had spent the previous months in a Siemens factory. Finally, they were put back on the train with the other deportees and sent to a camp near Hamburg from where they were released by the Red Cross. The six women were sent to Malmö in Sweden to recover.

Meanwhile, negotiations were under way between Count Bernadotte, President of the Swedish Red Cross, Norbert Masur, representing the World Jewish Congress, and Heinrich Himmler for the prisoners in Ravenbrück to be transferred to the care of the Red Cross. At the beginning of April, the first group of patients were evacuated from the camp. On 23 April, those remaining – 488 Frenchwomen, 231 Belgians and 34 Dutch women – were freed by the Red Cross and evacuated. One of the last women to be released by the Red Army was Simone Loche, who was evacuated by the Red Cross after undergoing an operation by a Russian doctor. She spent several months rehabilitation in a hospital in Créteil. She was released on 30 April. Adelaïde Hautval and Marie-Claude Vailant-Couturier decided to stay on site to take care of the sick and agreed to be repatriated only when their last patient had left the camp. Of the 230 women of the French Resistance who were deported in the convoy on 24 January 1943, only 49 survived.

=== Post-war ===
Several women from the convoy testified against those who had arrested and abused them. Betty Langlois testified during the trial of Fernand David, who had been Head of the Special Brigades in Paris, and who sent several members of the convoy to be deported. He was sentenced to be shot. Marie-Claude Vaillant-Couturier testified on 28 January 1946 during the Nuremberg Trials.

Adelaide Hautval was awarded the title of Righteous Among the Nations in 1985 for trying to save her patients in the camps where she was held. Annette Epaud also received the title of Righteous Among the Nations, posthumously in 1997, for having given water to the women dying in Block 25 of Auschwitz, including many Jews, an act which led to her being sent to the gas chamber a few days later.

Many survivors suffered consequences to their health after their years of detention. Problems included: arthritis, flare-ups of typhus, chronic exhaustion and depression.

The last survivor of the Convoi des 31000, Christiane (Cécile) Charua, died at the end of October 2016, aged 101.

== Women in the convoy ==
The Convoi des 31000 is unusual in that of the 230 women who were deported, most of them were arrested for acts of Resistance. It was the only convoy carrying women in the Resistance under the Nacht und Nebel operations. Of the 230 women, 85% of them were members of the Resistance; 199 women were also Communist Party members. The husbands of 36 out of the 230 women were killed by the Nazis, either shot or murdered during detention. Ninety-nine of the women had children, 167 in all, the youngest of whom was barely a few months old when their mother was deported.

Of the 230 women in the convoy, none of the 54 who were over 44 years old survived. Of the 21 aged between 40 and 44, six survived. Of the 38 between 35 and 40, there were eight survivors. There were 17 survivors of those between 25 and 35 while there were 18 survivors of those 50 between 17 and 25.

One hundred and six women came from Île-de-France; 85 came from towns of more than 10,000 inhabitants, 32 from towns or villages of less than 10,000, and for six of them, the information is unknown. Nine of those in this convoy were not French.

Regarding their professionals, there were four chemists (including Marie-Élise Nordmann-Cohen), three doctors (Maï Politzer, midwife; Danielle Casanova, dentist; and Adélaïde Hautval, psychiatrist), a teacher, 21 seamstresses, one singer and some students.

== Gallery ==
=== Survivors ===
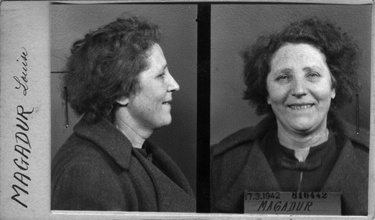
Louise Magadur

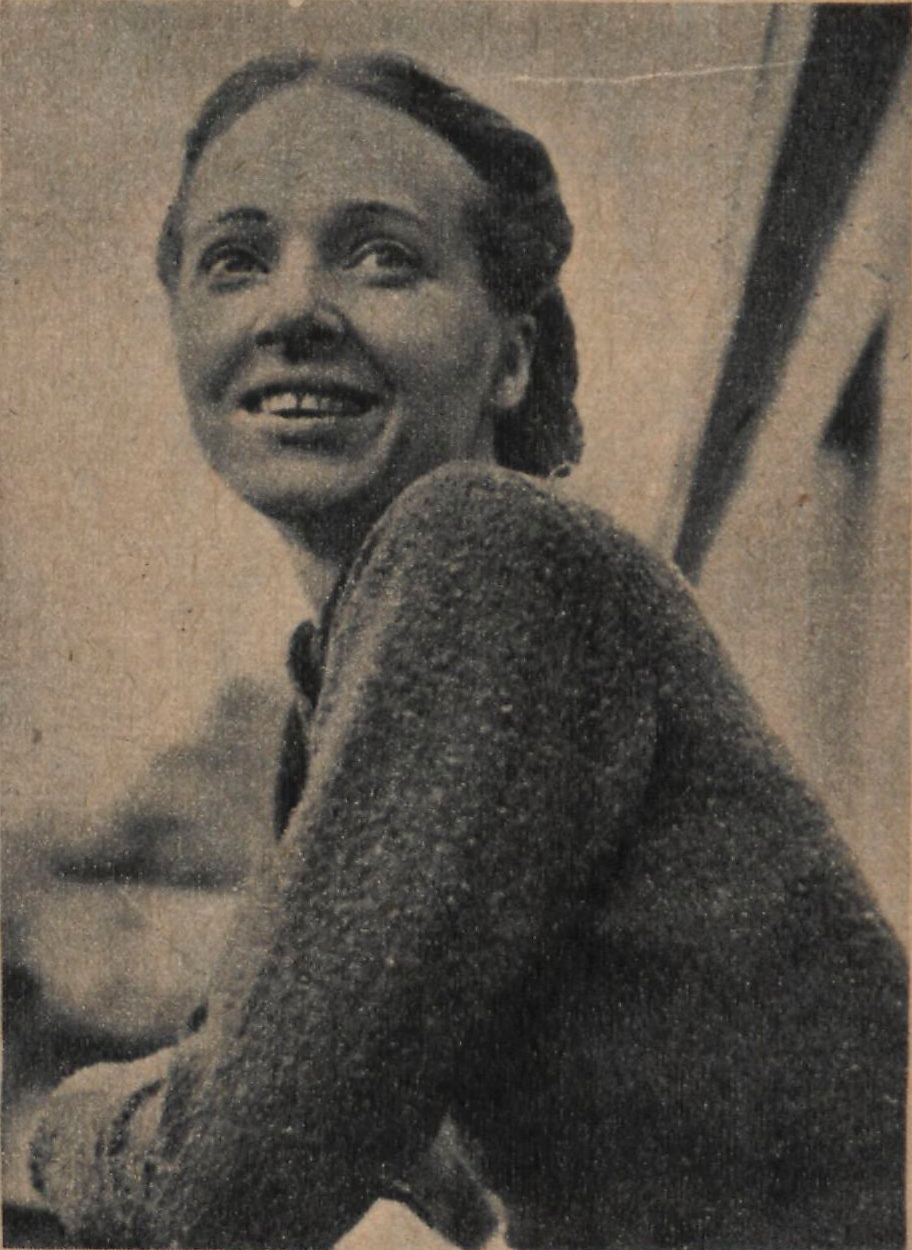
Marie-Claude Vaillant-Couturier

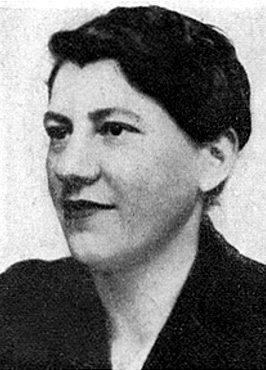
Hélène Solomon-Langevin

=== Victims ===
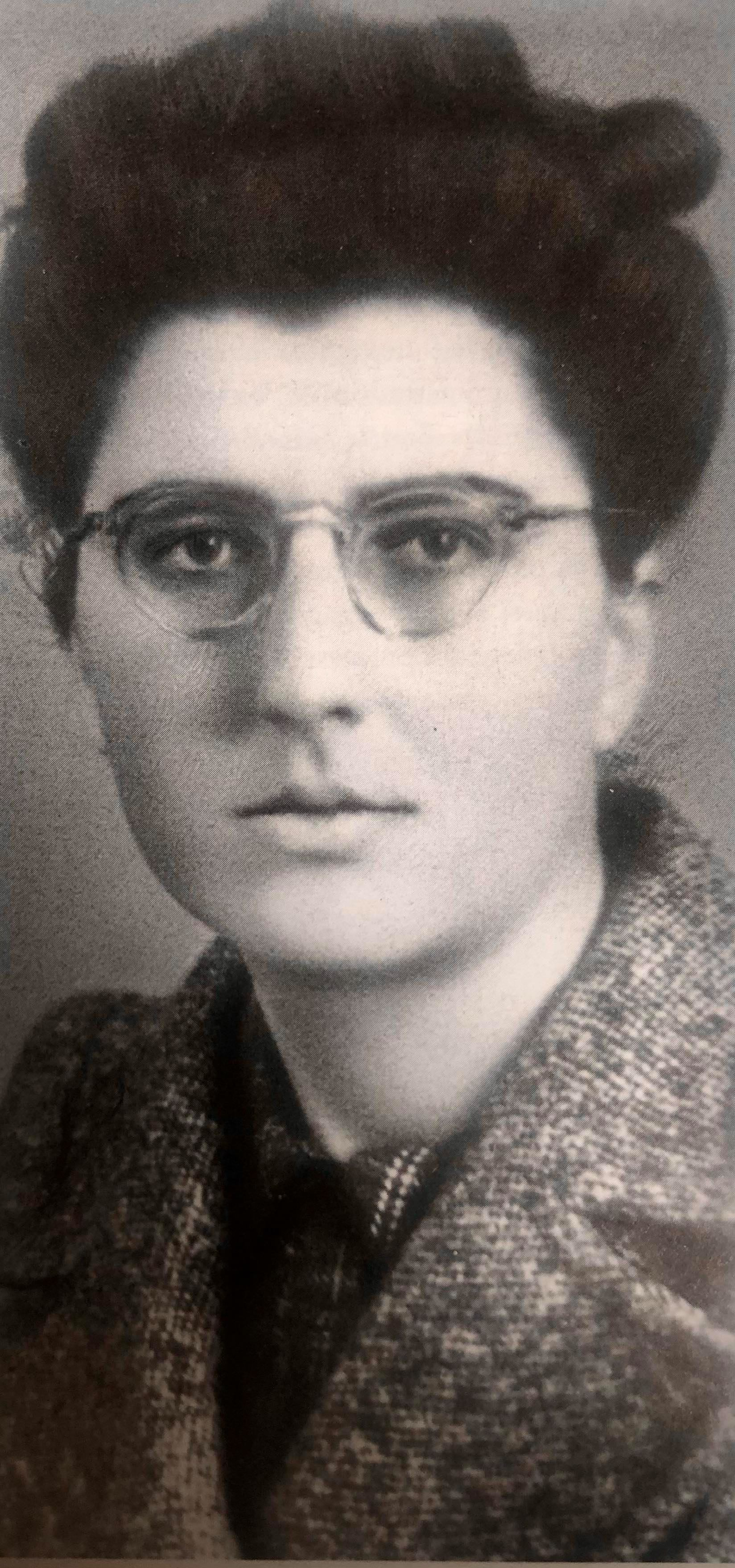
Laure Gatet

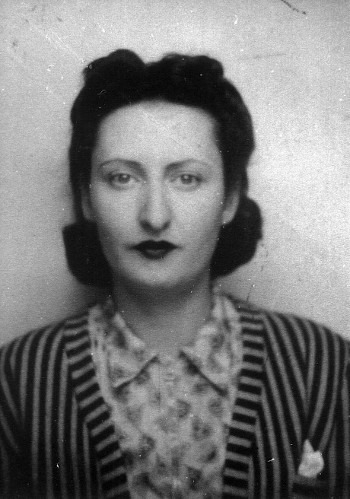
Vittoria Nenni

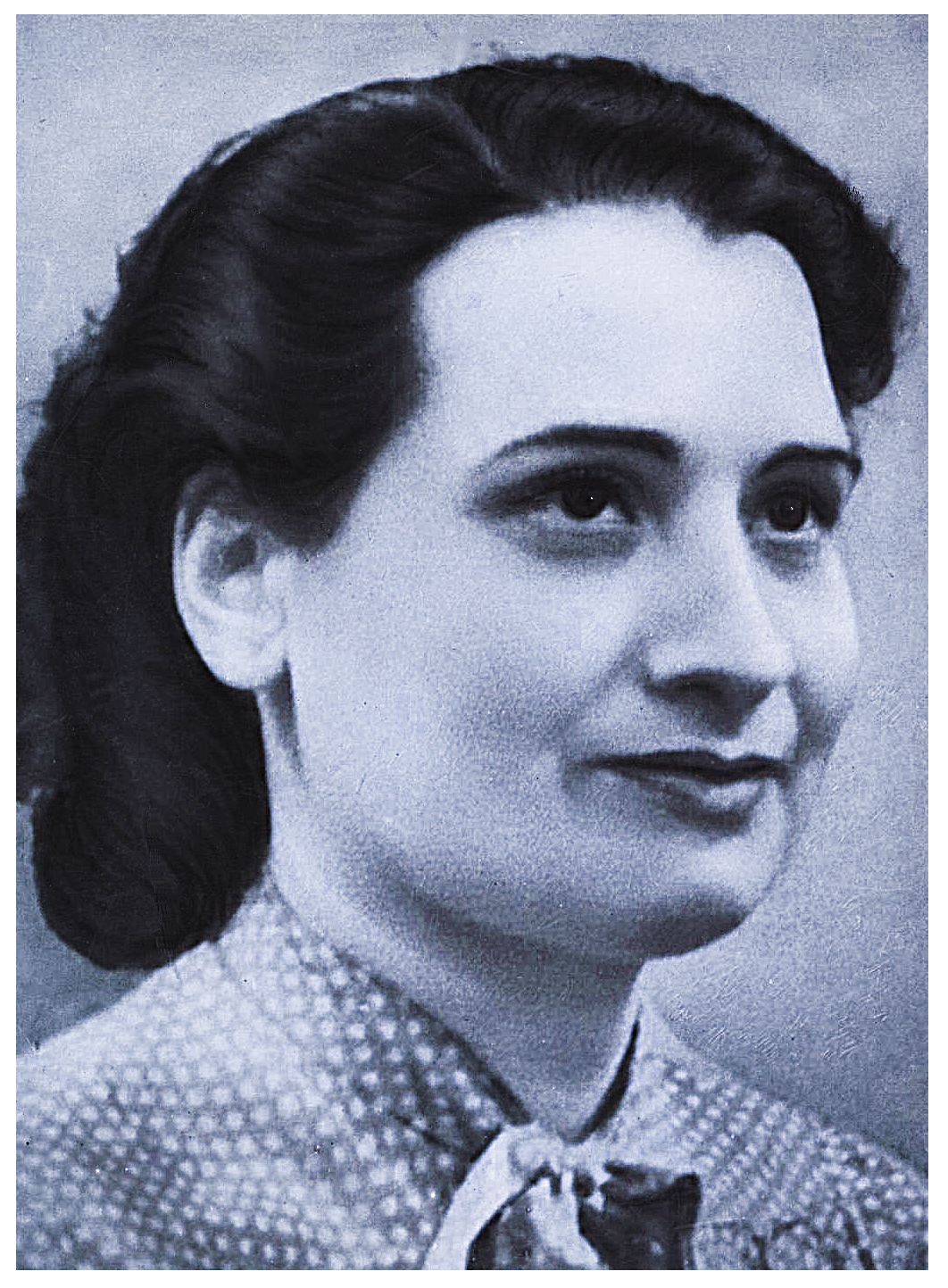
Danielle Casanova

== Commemoration ==
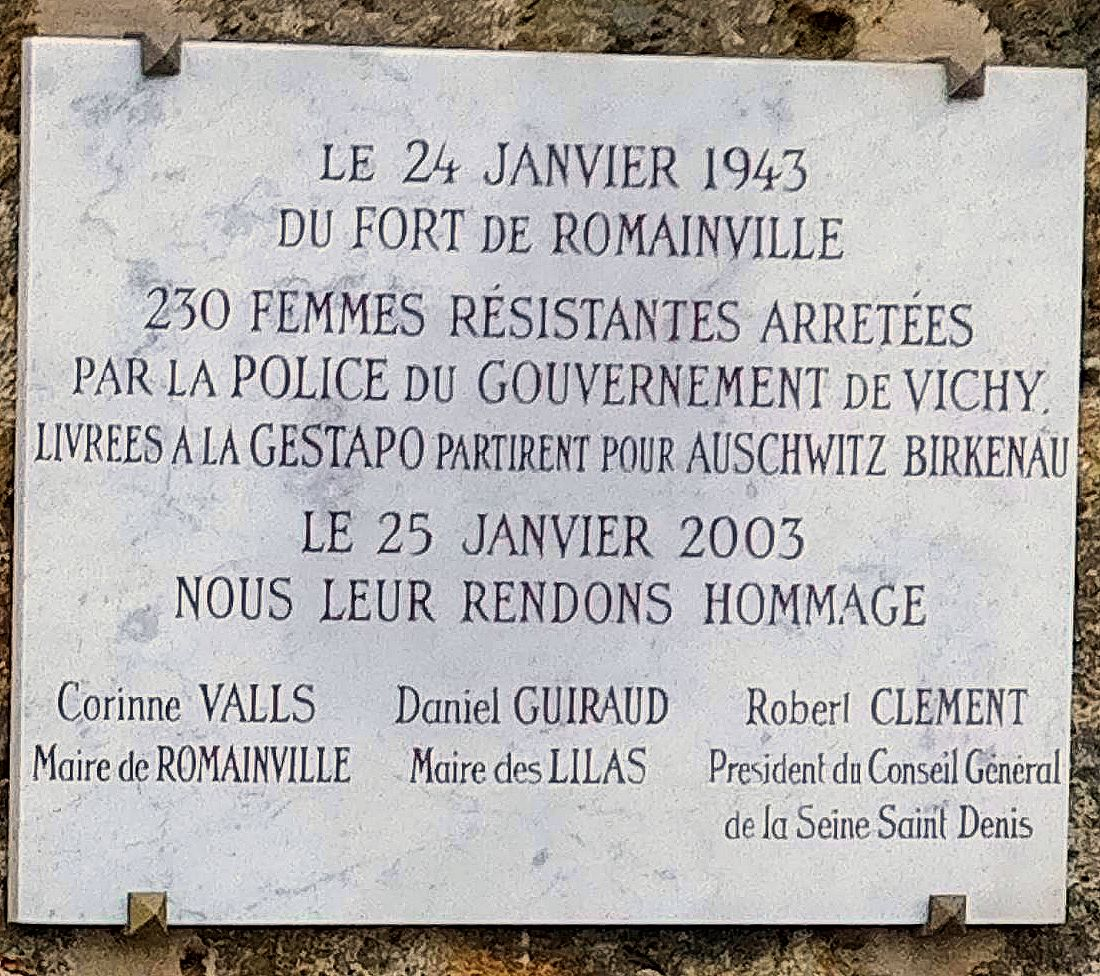
Commemorative plaque at Fort Romainville

In September 1943, when information on the fate of French women in the convoy began to circulate in resistance circles, Louis Aragon wrote a poem about them, which began: "Je vous salue, Maries des France aux cent visages" [Translation: "I salute you, Maries of France with a hundred faces"].

Soon after her return, Charlotte Delbo wrote her Auschwitz manuscript but did not submit it to an editor until 20 years later. The first volume came out in 1965. The same year, she published Le Convoi du 24 janvier, which included the biographies of the 230 women in the convoy.

On 25 January 2003, to commemorate the 60th anniversary of the convoy, a plaque was affixed to the wall of Fort Romainville.

In 2008, the biographer Caroline Moorehead decided to contact the survivors of the convoy to write their story. There were seven still living at the time. She met Betty Langlois, Cécile Charua, Madeleine Dissoubray and Poupette Alizon, whose sister died in the camps.

In 2013, an amateur theatre festival paid tribute to the Convoi des 31000 with a play by Gérard Thévenin. In 2019, a play called Convoy 31000 was directed by Tina Taylor at the Lunatico Theater in Berkeley, California.

A documentary on the history of the convoy was broadcast in January 2019 on the French channel Toute l'Histoire.

Each year, in Romainville, the date of the convoy's departure is marked with a wreath-laying ceremony.

== See also ==
- Timeline of deportations of French Jews to death camps
