= Élisabeth Le Port =

French Resistance fighter from Tours

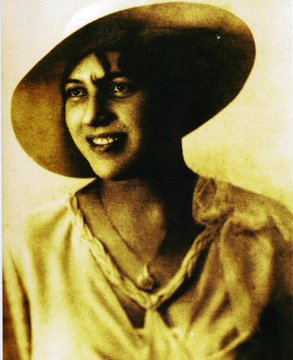
- Born: Élisabeth Marcelle Marthe Le Port; 9 April 1919; Lorient, Morbihan
- Died: 14 March 1943 (aged 23); Auschwitz
- Occupation(s): Teacher, French Resistance fighter

Élisabeth Le Port (9 April 1919 - 14 March 1943) was a member of the French Resistance in the Indre et Loire department in west-central France. She was denounced for publishing an underground newspaper and she died in a concentration camp.

== Early life ==
Élisabeth Marcelle Marthe Le Port was born on 9 April 1919 in Lorient, Morbihan. She was the daughter of Marie-Thérèse Gloton and Marcel Le Port, a 24-year-old railwayman and fitter at Établissements maritimes du port de Lorient. The family moved to Indre et Loire when her father found a job with the Compagnie du chemin de fer de Paris à Orléans (the Paris to Orléans railway company).

Elisabeth Le Port grew up in Saint Symphorien, north of Tours. Her younger brother Jack was born there on 9 June 1925. A gifted musician, she won a conservatoire prize for piano.

She wanted to become a teacher, and entered the l'Ecole Normale primaire in Tours in 1936. Le Port became close to some of the communist students, which frightened her parents, who were fervent Catholics. Her first teaching post was in Saint-Christophe-sur-le-Nais, in the north-west of the Indre et Loire département. She joined the village school in 1939 and was confirmed in posted on 1 January 1940.

== Second World War ==
Revolted by the Vichy government's policy of collaboration with the invading Nazis, Le Port joined the Union of Communist Students. She soon became responsible for the clandestine newspaper La lanterne, which had communist leanings, and printed it illegally in her school using a mimeograph. She wrote: "We must wage a fierce struggle against the enemy so that he can feel the ground burning under his feet". In 1942, she joined the Front National resistance network.

Le Port gave private piano lessons to Nicole, a 16-year-old friend of a Wehrmacht officer. Nicole discovered a number of leaflets in her teacher's drawers. The girl denounced her.

On 18 June 1942, Le Port was arrested by the Gestapo at her school. In her flat the Gestapo discovered leaflets, newspapers and a typewriter, but not a single document that could compromise her friends.

She was imprisoned in the Tours prison at 28 rue Henri-Martin where she was beaten and tortured, but she never broke. She later told a companion: "If you only knew how they beat me in Tours prison to make me denounce the others. They promised to release me if I spoke up. I regret nothing...". A cellmate was local woman and Resistance worker Maria Murzeau . She was then transferred to the Fort de Romainville internment camp on 7 November 1942. There she met Hélène Fournier, another Resistance worker, also from Tours.

On 24 January 1943, Le Port was deported to the Birkenau camp in Auschwitz. She was part of Convoi des 31000 (the Convoy of 31,000), so named because the women, mostly Communist Party members or Resistance fighters, were assigned numbers between 31625 and 31854 when they reached Auschwitz. At Châlons-sur-Marne station, she threw a letter out of the window addressed to her parents. The message read in part "Today, 24 January 1943, 250 women and 2,000 men interned at the Compiègne and Romainville camps.... are being deported to Germany singing 'La Marseillaise', confident of the forthcoming victory of the Allies and the liberation of France". Railway workers picked it up and posted it to her parents in Tours.

She was registered in Birkenau on 27 January 1943 under the number 31786, which was immediately tattooed on her left forearm. On 3 February, she returned on foot to Auschwitz with other prisoners, in rows of five.

In March 1943, exhausted by dysentery, yet helped and supported by her comrades, she could no longer work. She was severely beaten and entered the Revier sick bay, where she died on 14 March 1943. Her parents learned of her death on 14 May 1943 from the German Kommandantur of Tours.

== Commemoration ==
On 17 June 1945, the municipality of Saint-Christophe-sur-le-Nais organised a remembrance event in Élisabeth Le Port's honour. Her parents were present. La Nouvelle République du Centre-Ouest reported the event. Speakers at the ceremony included Georges Girard, the town's mayor; Paul Racault, on behalf of the Libération-Nord network, the school inspector, Héléna Fournier, who had been repatriated from Auschwitz just six weeks previously, and the préfet of Indre-et-Loire. A marble plaque was affixed to the wall of the classroom where she had taught. The plaque refers to an execution by shooting, which is untrue.

In 2010, in Saint-Christophe-sur-le-Nais, l'association Histoire et Patrimoine organised a tribute to Élisabeth Le Port, which was attended by around a hundred people.

A street bears her name in Saint-Christophe-sur-le-Nais. There are commemorative plaques in Place Velpeau, Tours, and in her former classroom in Saint-Christophe-sur-le-Nais.
