= Laure Gatet =

French biochemist, member of the French Resistance, deported to Auschwitz (1913–1943)

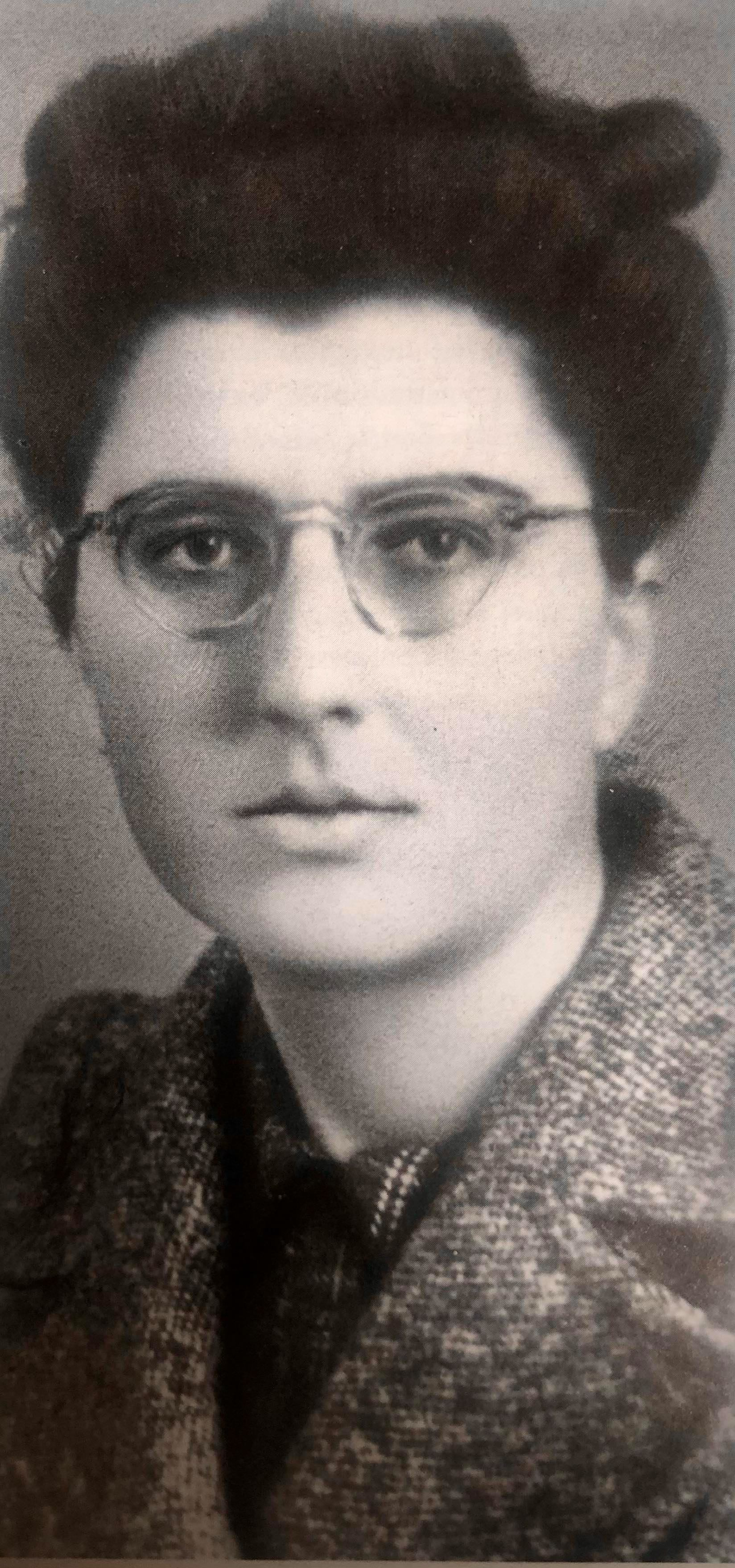
- Laure Gatet in 1940.
- Born: 19 July 1913; Boussac-Bourg, France
- Died: 25 February 1943 (aged 29); Auschwitz-Birkenau, German-occupied Poland

Laure Gatet (19 July 1913 – 25 February 1943) was a French pharmacist, biochemist, and a spy for the French Resistance during World War II.

Gatet was born on 19 July 1913 in Boussac-Bourg, France. After attending several schools in the Southwest of France, including Périgueux and Bordeaux, Gatet finished her pharmacy studies before moving to biochemical research. During the German occupation, she engaged in the resistance network, the Brotherhood of Our Lady, as a liaison to Free France. She mainly performed actions of propaganda and information exchanges between France and its neighboring countries. Spotted by the German police, she was arrested on the evening of 10 June 1942 and detained in several prisons before being transferred to the Auschwitz concentration camp where she was murdered.

== Childhood and schooling debut ==
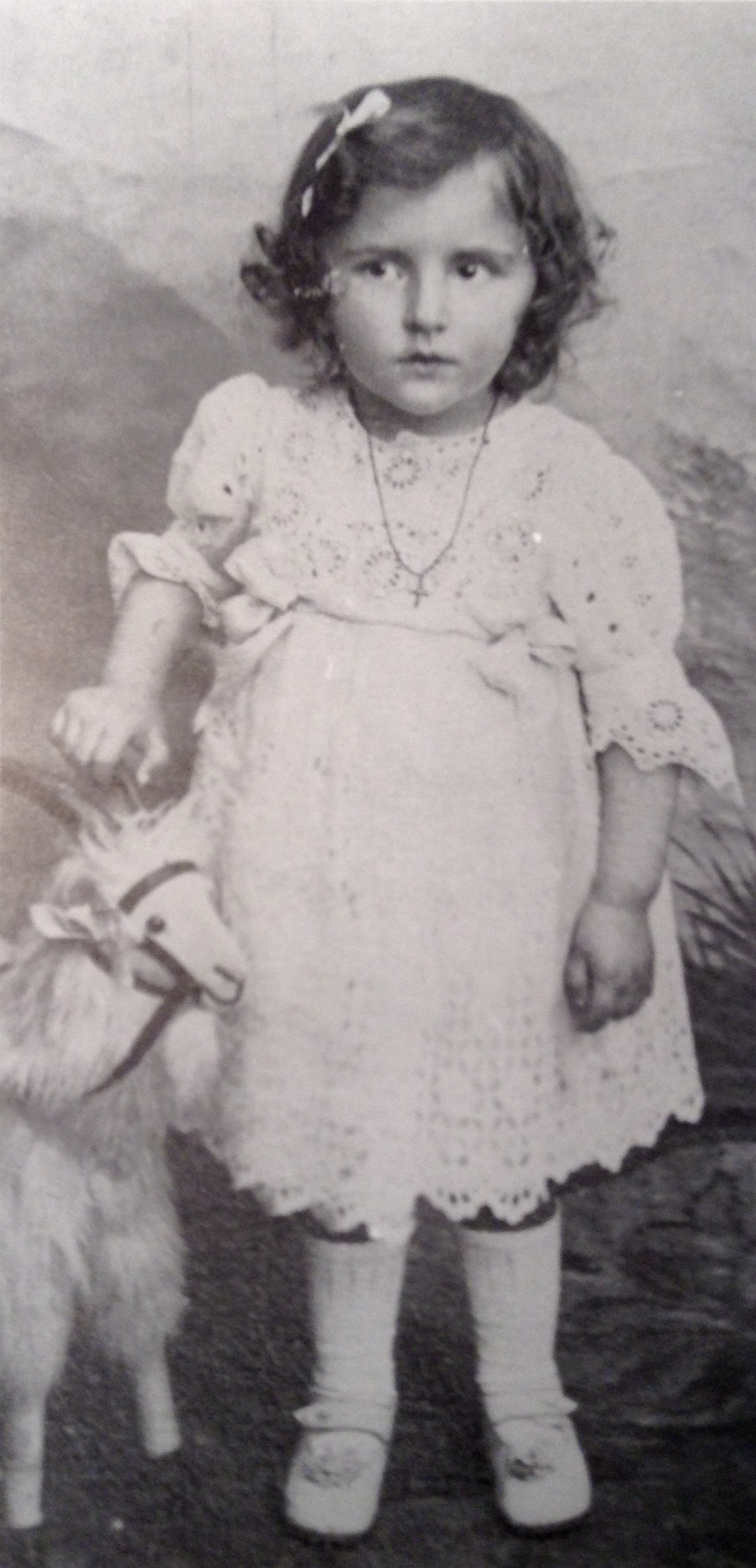
Gatet at age 2.

Laure Constance Pierrette Gatet was born in Boussac-Bourg in Creuse, France on 19 July 1913. Her family promoted education and her mother and aunt attended a girls' high school and earned their high school diploma and certificate of competency. Her father was a teacher, inspector and director of training schools.

Gatet was brilliant in her primary studies. She was first educated in a primary school for girls in La Villeneuve from 1920 to 1924 and then at the school of Boussac-Ville in 1925. In April 1925, she joined the young girls college in Aurillac, Cantal. Several awards were given to her during her school career. In February 1926, for example, with the results of her graduation certificate, she won a bicycle.

Gatet was one of the most awarded school students and was cited many times on the honor roll. She received the Disciplinary Board congratulations for impeccable behavior. When she obtained her high school diploma, she also received the 1st prize for outstanding results in mathematics and English. She also excelled in literature, physics, chemistry, history and geography, Spanish, Latin, and visual arts.

On 11 July 1930, Gatet passed the series A and B of her first tests for her baccalaureate at the University of Bordeaux. Her tests were marked "good enough" and as a result she passed. In April 1931, she was elected president of the "Horizon", a cooperative founded to "strengthen links among students" and organize various cultural clubs.

== Graduate studies ==
Gatet decided to study to be a pharmacist, which was the most common science study in baccalaureate at that time. She began her training with a mandatory one-year internship, from July 1931 to October 1932, with Mr. Pasquet, owner of the central pharmacy in town hall square in Périgueux.

Following the internship, Gatet resumed her studies at the Faculty of Pharmacy of Bordeaux, where she received her diploma as a pharmacist in 1936. At the same time, she started preparing for degree in Natural Sciences at the Faculty of Science. She obtained her mineralogy certificate in June 1935, biological chemistry in June 1936 and botany in June 1938.

She found that she was not attracted to profession of pharmacist dispensary, so she finally decided to move towards biochemistry, and at the end of 1936, she was accepted at the Laboratory of Physiological Chemistry of Professor Louis Genevois, in the Faculty of Science. While there, she devoted herself to her thesis and collaborated in scientific articles with different colleagues, in particular Pierre Cayrol, a specialist in yeast and a former doctoral student in the same laboratory.

Gatet's thesis dealt with the maturation of grapes over time. The subject was of particular interest to Gatet, whose paternal grandfather was a winemaker. Based on three types of white and red grapes, collected between 1936 and 1938, Gatet developed many preparations, mixtures and methods to carry out this study over the next two years. She defended her thesis on 23 February 1940. This quality work is also the subject of a publication in the journal Annals of Physiology and Biological Physical Chemistry. Furthermore, the International Office of Wine awarded her work on 12 June 1946 (after her death) for a price of 5,000 francs.

In the absence of employment, Laure Gatet was supported financially by her family from 1931 to 1938. During the academic year 1938–1939, the Schutzenberger Foundation offered her a scholarship of 10,000 francs for one year. Gatet was then subsidized by the National Fund for Scientific Research (CNRS), which granted her a half-scholarship of 12,500 francs. She also won many other scholarships.

== Involvement in the resistance ==
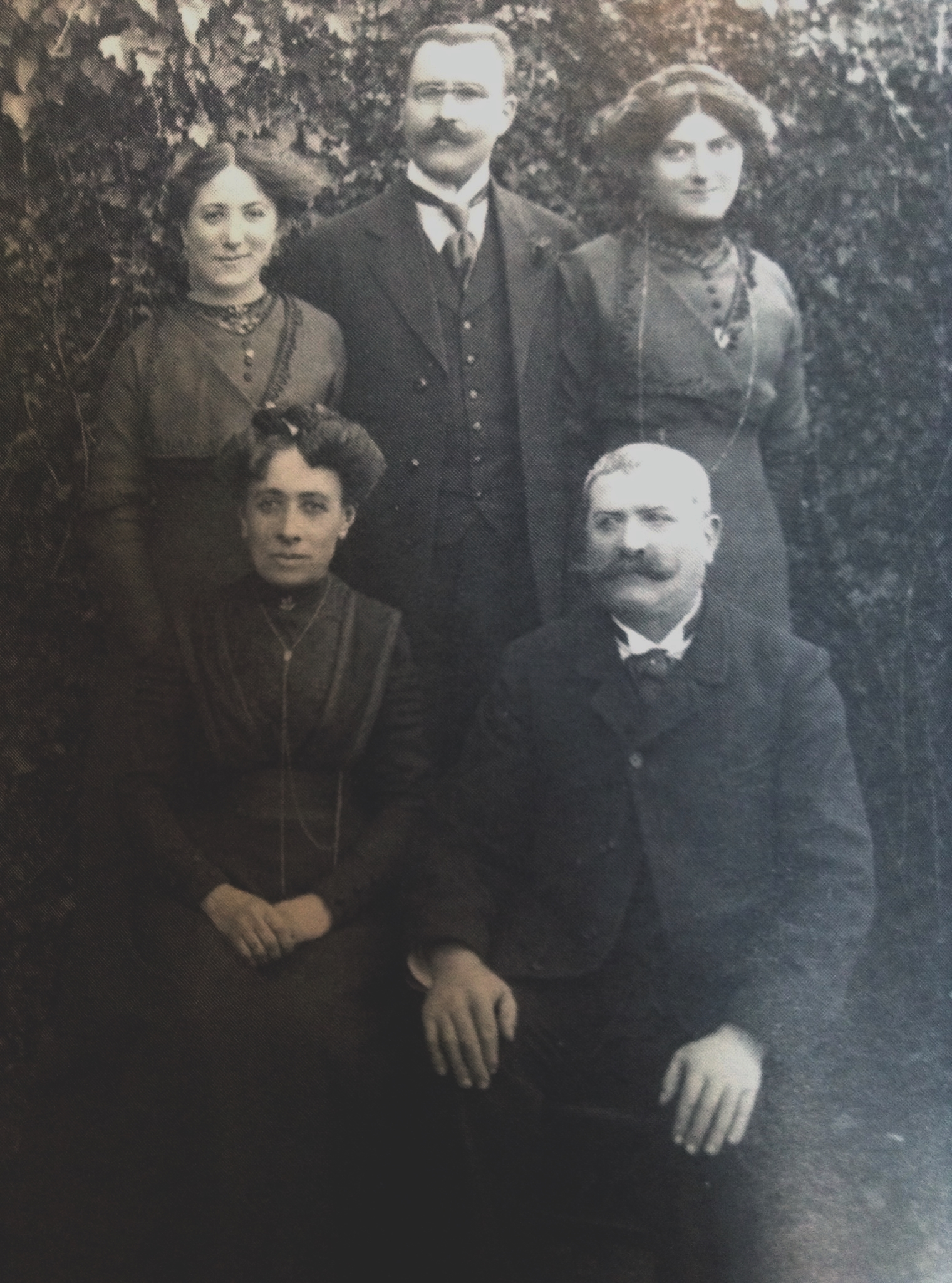
Gatet's family in 1912. Standing from left to right: Marie Laure Malassenet, (Laure Gatet's aunt whom she later stayed with) Louis Eugene Gatet, (Laura's father) Marguerite Agathe (her mother) Seated left to right: Marie Laure Martin, wife of Félix and Laure Malassenet maternal grandmother, Felix Malassenet, maternal grandfather of Laura.

In Bordeaux, before the Second World War, Gatet met with a group of Catholics led by Jesuit Father Antoine Dieuzayde at the foyer Henri Bazire. Many of them worked at a Catholic summer camp that he founded near Barèges, which was also organized to support refugees from the Spanish Civil War. This group was known as the "Barégeois Bordeaux." In June 1940, Father Dieuzayde and most of the other members of the group looked for ways to resist the Germans. Gatet regularly attended their meetings.

On the night of 19 – 20 June 1940, Gatet was in Bordeaux with her aunt when the midnight bombing began. According to a testimony from Gatet's mother dating from 1955, at that time "Laure still hopes that France will be saved, [...] she does not accept the occupation, often at night, I hear her cry" .

Gatet returned to live with her aunt, Marie Laure, in Bordeaux as the occupation of the city started at the beginning of October 1940. From that moment, she engaged in propaganda against the Nazis through Pierre Cayrol. In January 1941, she joined the resistance network and provided information to the Confrérie Notre-Dame (CND), headed in Bordeaux by Commander Jean Fleuret. She continued her propaganda activities against the occupiers. In 1982, Louis Genevois wrote that Laura Gatet made Gaullist propaganda, a dangerous mix that scared her secretary. Gatet and other resistant members in the CND network gathered each Sunday morning in Victor Hugo Bordeaux. Each person gave the others information collected. The information was then sent to London, to agents in the free zone or on the borders of the country. Gatet hid the classified top secret papers in boxes of baking powder. She received a pass, allowing her to cross the line and visit her parents in Périgueux. During these visits, she was often searched but the Germans never found anything that could accuse her.

On 10 June 1942, however, Laure Gatet and thirty-three other members of the CND network were arrested. Pierre Cartaud, the Liaison Officer of the Network in Paris was arrested on 29 or 30 May 1942 and had admitted, after being tortured, of the existence of the network and provided a number of names. It was 5 am when three officers of the Sicherheitsdienst, dressed as French civilians arrived to arrest her. They searched the entire house for three or four hours, then took her away.

== Detention ==
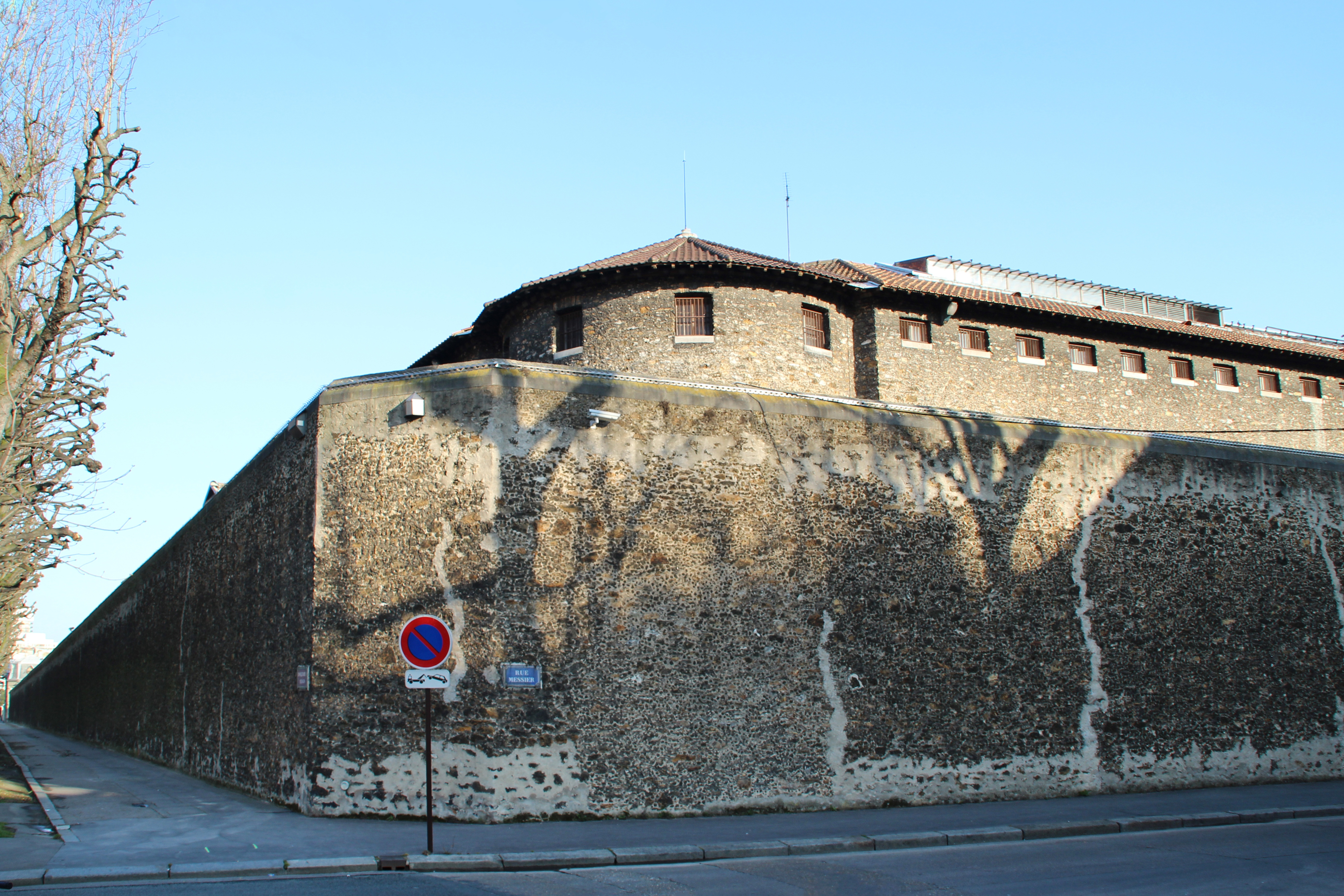
La Sante Prison in Paris where Gatet was held for a while

After her arrest, Gatet was transferred to the barracks in Boudet, then to Château du Hâ in Bordeaux. She was held there for three days and although she underwent several interrogations, never denounced anyone. On the day of her arrest on 10 June 1942, her aunt, Marie Laure, went to the central police station for news and then to the military headquarters in Bordeaux. There, an officer informed her of the whereabouts of her niece, assuring her that the place had good living conditions. Marie Laure tried to have her niece released, but without success. 15 June 1942, she tried to visit her, but Laure was no longer strong, as evidenced by a police report of 16 June 1942. In another report, dated 29 June 1942, Gatet was supposedly returned to Bordeaux. On 3 July 1942, Marie Laure received a letter informing her that her niece was detained in prison La Santé Prison in Paris. She had been detained there since 14 June 1942. Gatet communicated with her family for a long time, from autumn 1942, receiving letters and parcels from them. She never talked about her situation in the prison and did not seem worried. On 8 September 1942, one of the letters she wrote to her to Marie Laure referred to Pierre Cartaud and his responsibility for dismantling the resistance network .

12 October 1942, Laure Gatet was transferred to Prison de Fresnes, and could not longer transmit news to her family. She was again transferred, this time to Fort Romainville, on 12 January 1943. Seven days later, she sent a letter to her family, saying she was "very well."

== Deportation ==
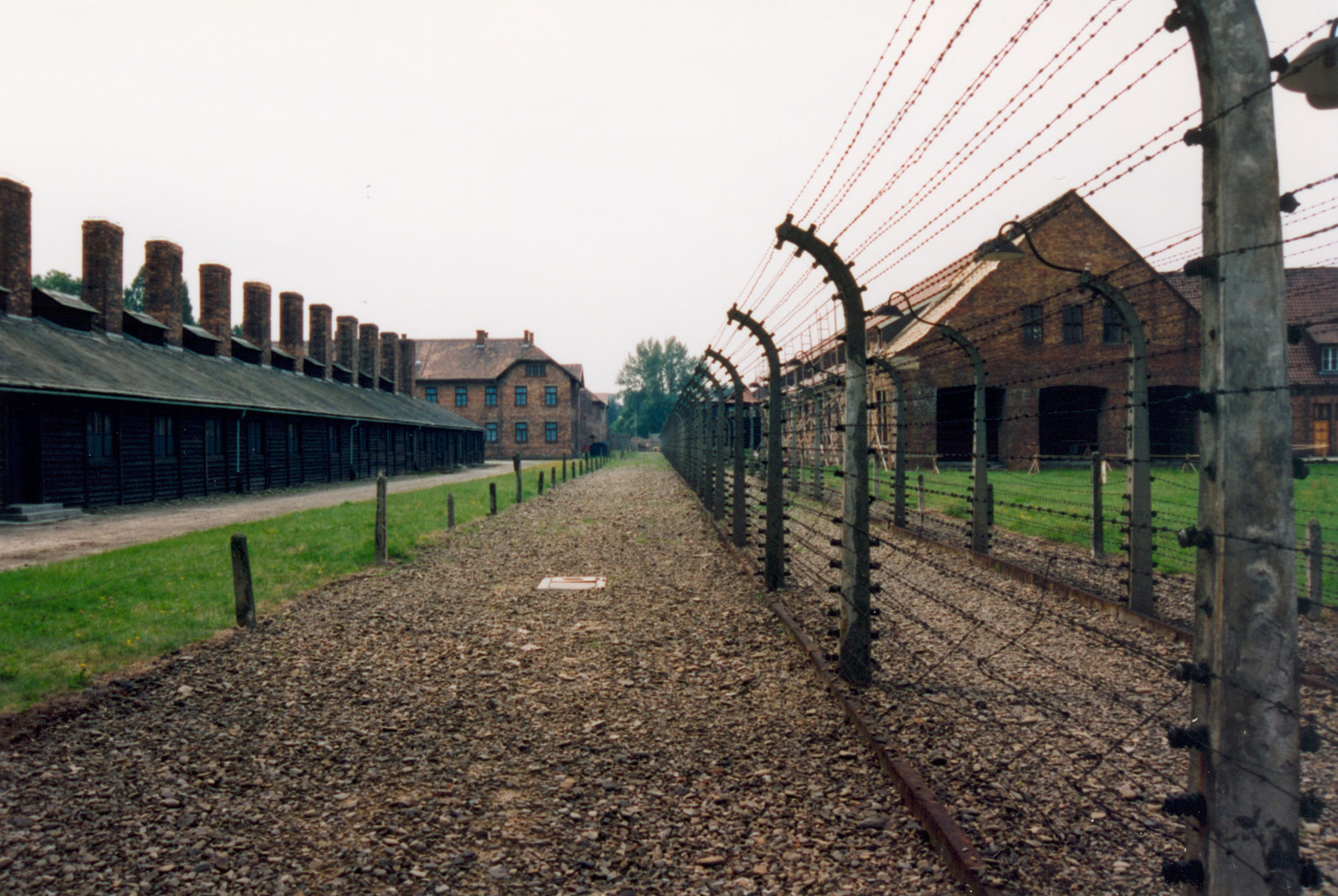
Auschwitz Concentration Camp where Gatet was murdered.

On 23 January 1943, Laure Gatet and one hundred and twenty-one prisoners from the Romainville fort were transferred to Camp de Royallieu in Compiegne, along with hundreds of others from various places of detention, mainly in the occupied zone. This particular convoy, known as Convoi des 31000 collected mostly intellectual members or relatives of the PCF (Danielle Casanova and Charlotte Delbo were among them) and some Gaullists, including Laure Gatet. The next day, two hundred and thirty were brought to the Compiegne station by truck and piled into the train alongside 1,200 men who were already loaded in the cars the day before, for a journey of three days. During the trip, passengers suffered from cold and malnutrition. The men were sent to Oranienburg concentration camp, on the outskirts of Berlin, but the women continued their journey to Poland and Auschwitz. As resistant or "common law", they were not theoretically intended to go to an extermination camp but to Ravensbrück concentration camp. Historians have failed to rationally explain this exception (there were only two convoys of "policies" that led to Auschwitz), except that it could have been an administrative error.

When the railcar doors were opened, Gatet and other women were led by soldiers into the women's camp of Birkenau. When they entered the camp, knowing that they were a "little out in luck," they sang La Marseillaise.

Gatet was tattooed on the left forearm and registered under registration number 31833, and underwent various tests. With the other women of the convoy, she was then quarantined in Block No. 14, given chores and undernourished. This was often enough to kill the older prisoners. The survivors were then taken to the main camp for anthropometric photography. The living conditions became worse for all the prisoners. Since 24 January 1943, any form of communication between Gatet and her family had been broken, while they tried in vain to find information about her whereabouts by sending letters to various public authorities.

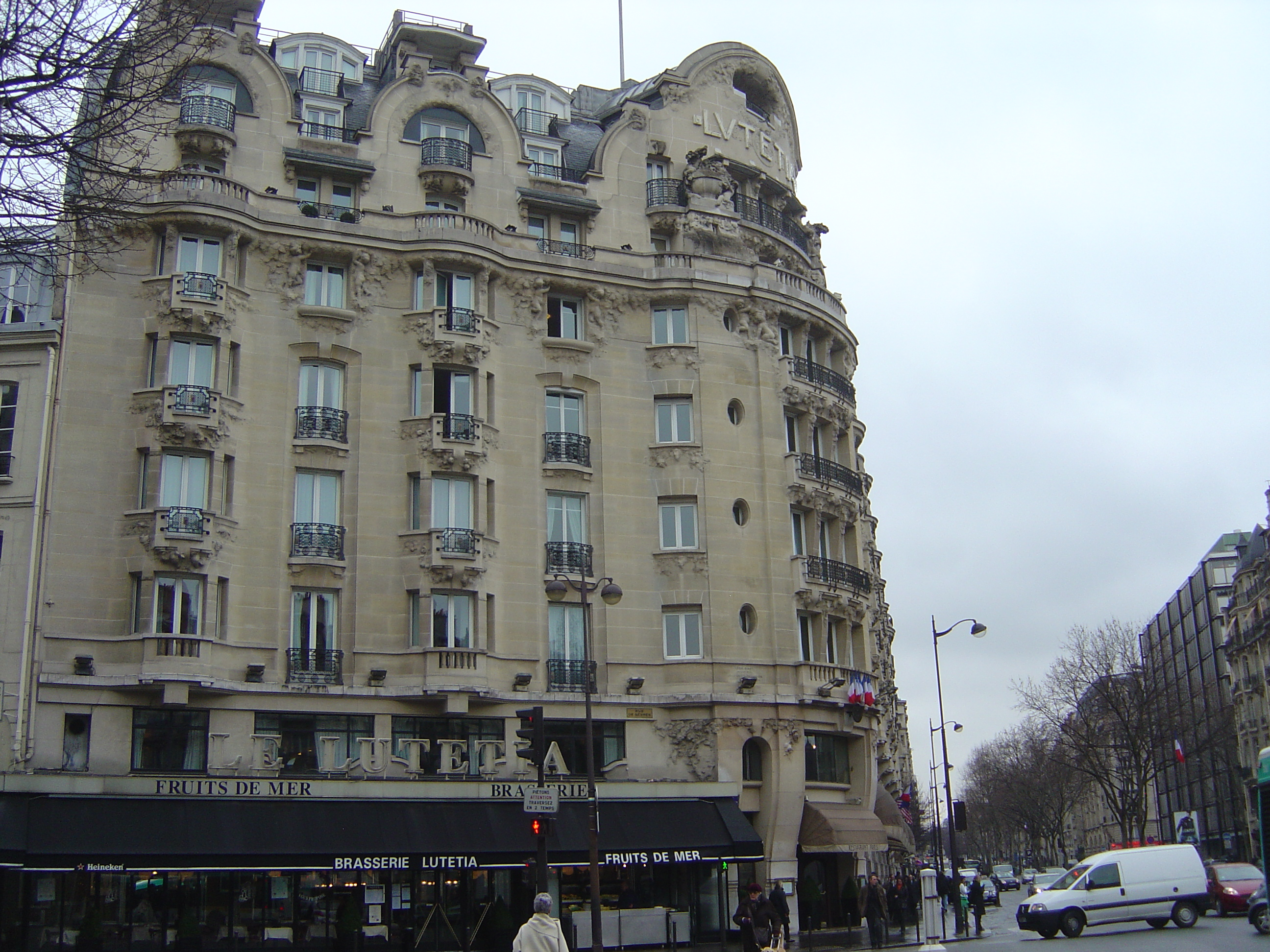
Hotel Lutetia in Paris

In February 1943, a secretary suggested seeking among prisoners for biologists, botanists and chemists to form the "Kommando Raisko," a program responsible for researching a species of dandelion, whose root is rich in latex. They were hoping to provide an alternative to rubber from the rubber tree that was sorely lacking in the German industry during the war. Gatet died before the program began in the middle of the month. No obituary was sent by the Nazi police to her family, which explains the uncertainty about the date of her death. Over 79% of the women in her convoy were murdered in the detention camp.

At the end of the war in April 1945, the Gatet family went repeatedly to the Hotel Lutetia, where most deported French survivors arrived. Her death certificate, finally came on 19 December 1946 in Paris. It was labeled "death of France" and officially dates the death of Laura Gatet at 25 February 1943.

== Memory ==
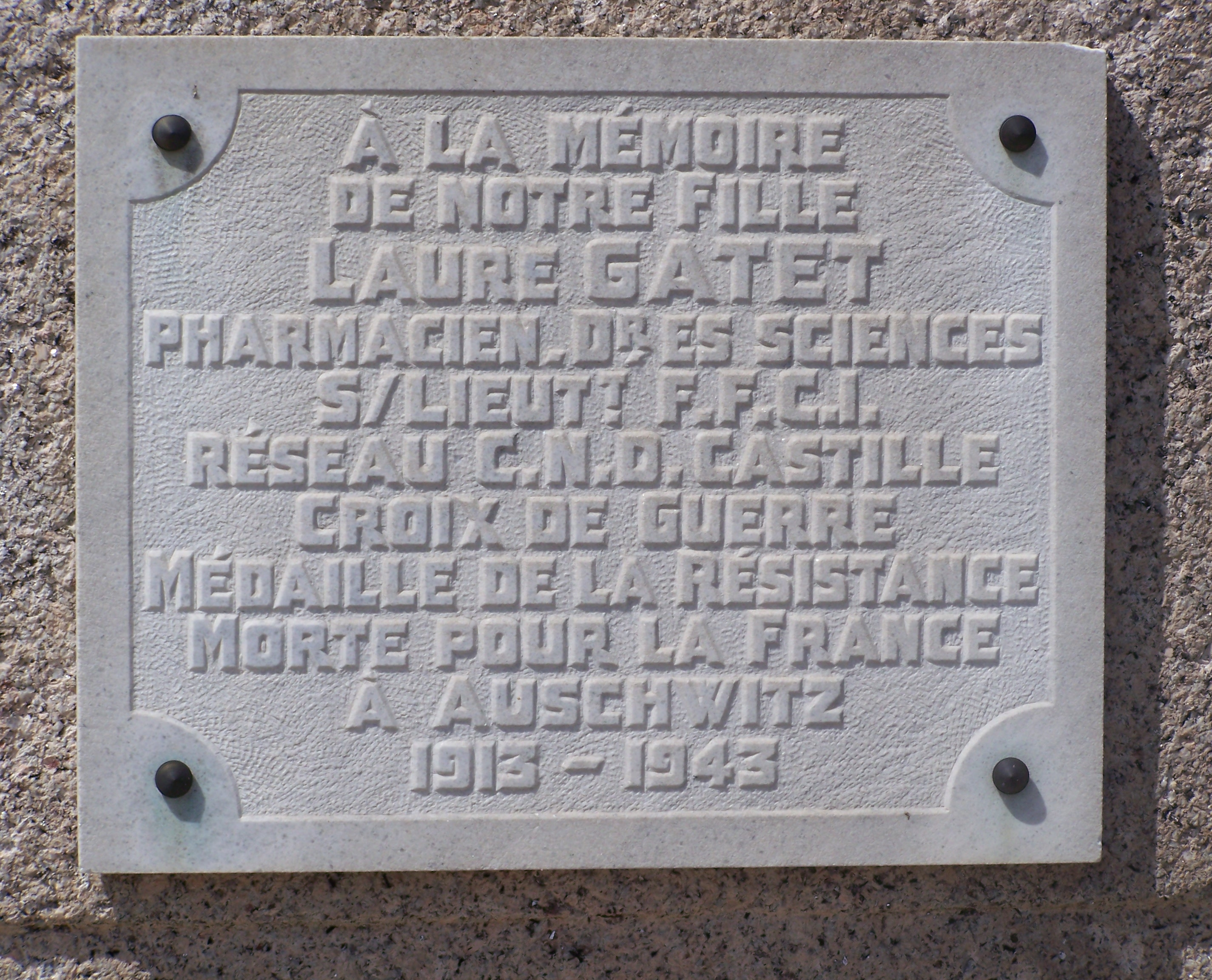
Plaque dedicated to Laure Gatet, in Boussac-Ville

On 15 January 1946, a religious celebration in tribute to victims of the Resistance took place at the Saint-André cathedral in Bordeaux. Laure Gatet's name was mentioned in the liturgy. Major political figures attended the ceremony, but not her aunt who still lived in the city. On 8 March 1946, by the decision of General de Gaulle, Gatet was posthumously decorated with the 1939–1945 Croix de Guerre. She was then elevated to the rank of lieutenant by the War Minister, Paul Coste-Floret, on 24 May 1947. She was also named to the French Legion of Honour on 10 November 1955 by President René Coty, who also assigns her the French Resistance Medal. On 16 June 1953, Gatet officially received the status of "remote-resistant" from the Departmental of Veterans Affairs in Limoges, following the request of her mother made two years before. With this award honoring her daughter, Gatet's mother received a mandate of 60,000 francs. Since 9 September 1992, the words "death in deportation" is affixed to Gatet's death certificate.

After the war, Gilbert Renault published various books about Laure Gatet, particularly Les Mains Jointes, the sixth volume of the memoirs of a secret agent of Free France, published in 1948. In June 1946, Jean Cayrol, the brother of Peter, the resistance companion that made him join the network, wrote in a literary magazine of Europe, about the living conditions in the concentration camps. He paid tribute to her with this title: "Man and the tree Laure Gatet martyrdom of resistance" .

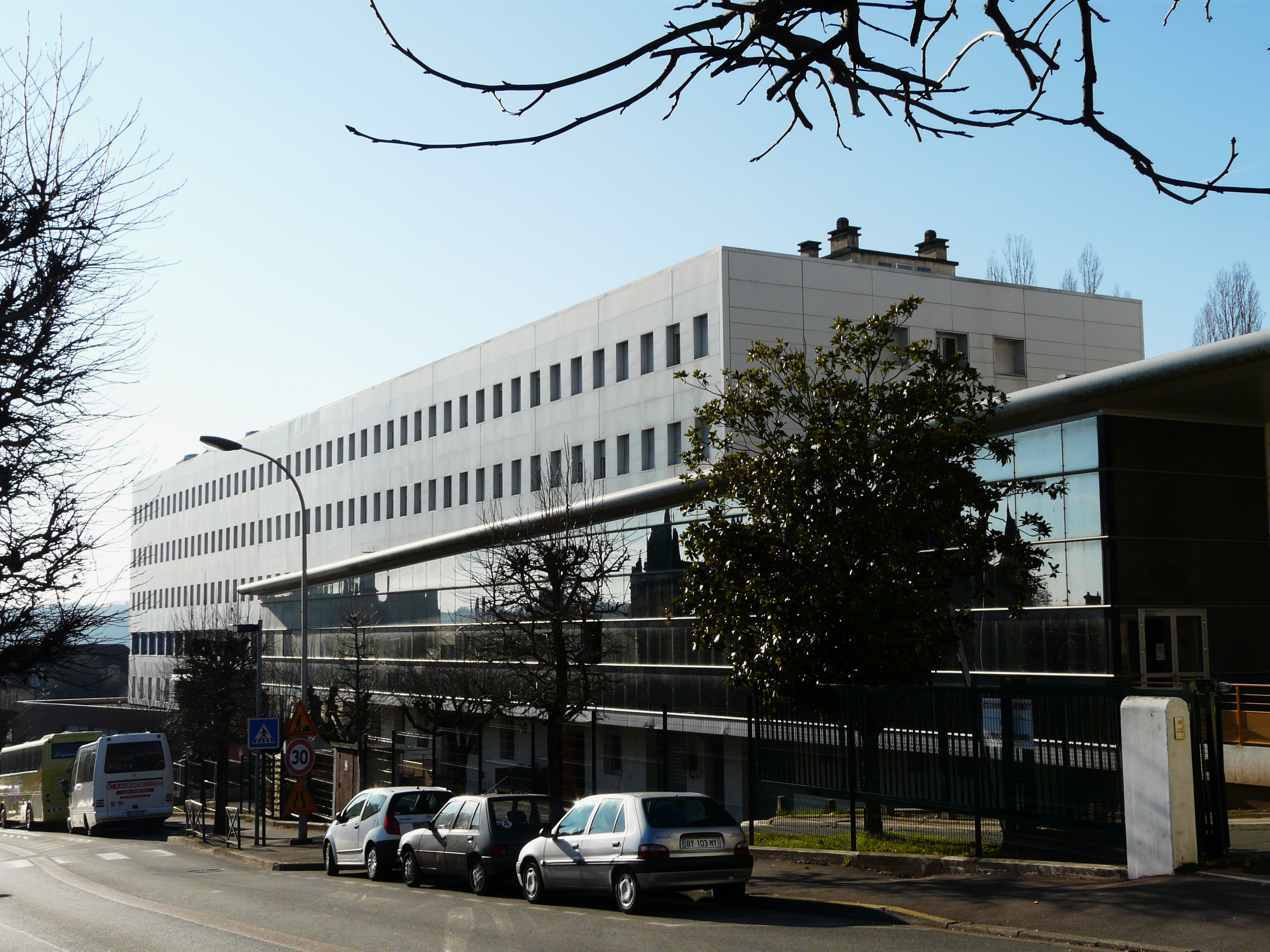
Laure Gatet School in Périgueux, France, named in her honor

Other tributes were paid to her in the postwar period, especially at the schools she attended in her youth. Different places now bear her name. For instance, the school, Lycée Laure Gatet of Périgueux, on the site of her old girls high school, was named after her on 11 June 1969. This was after building renovations and decision of the municipal council. Additionally, the street where Gatet was arrested by the SS on 10 June 1942, in Bordeaux, was named Laure-Gatet Street on 2 October 1951. Her name also appears on a plaque in memory of the dead students of France, placed in the lobby of the former faculty of medicine and pharmacy of Bordeaux. A monument in her honor was erected in April 1997, in Boussac-Bourg, in the place called "The board pre" near the house where Laure Gatet grew up. Her name is also added to the family tomb of Gatet Malassenet her family, situated in the center of the cemetery in Boussac-Ville.

In 2011, Laure Gatet was one of the twenty-five women honored in the traveling exhibition "Famous Women of Périgord", organized by the General Council of the Dordogne by sociologist Victoria Estier-Man.

On 8 March 2013, on the occasion of International Women's Day, the newspaper Sud Ouest, conducted a survey. The survey question was "Who is your favorite Perigord?" Laure Gatet led with 30.4% of the votes cast.

From 18 March – 28 April 2013, an exhibition on the history and life of the resistance took place inside the Laure-Gatet school on the occasion of the centenary of her birth in partnership with the municipal library in Périgueux.<re name=ph/>
