= Marie-Claude Vaillant-Couturier =

French Resistance hero and communist politician (1912–1996)

Madame Marie-Claude Vaillant-Couturier
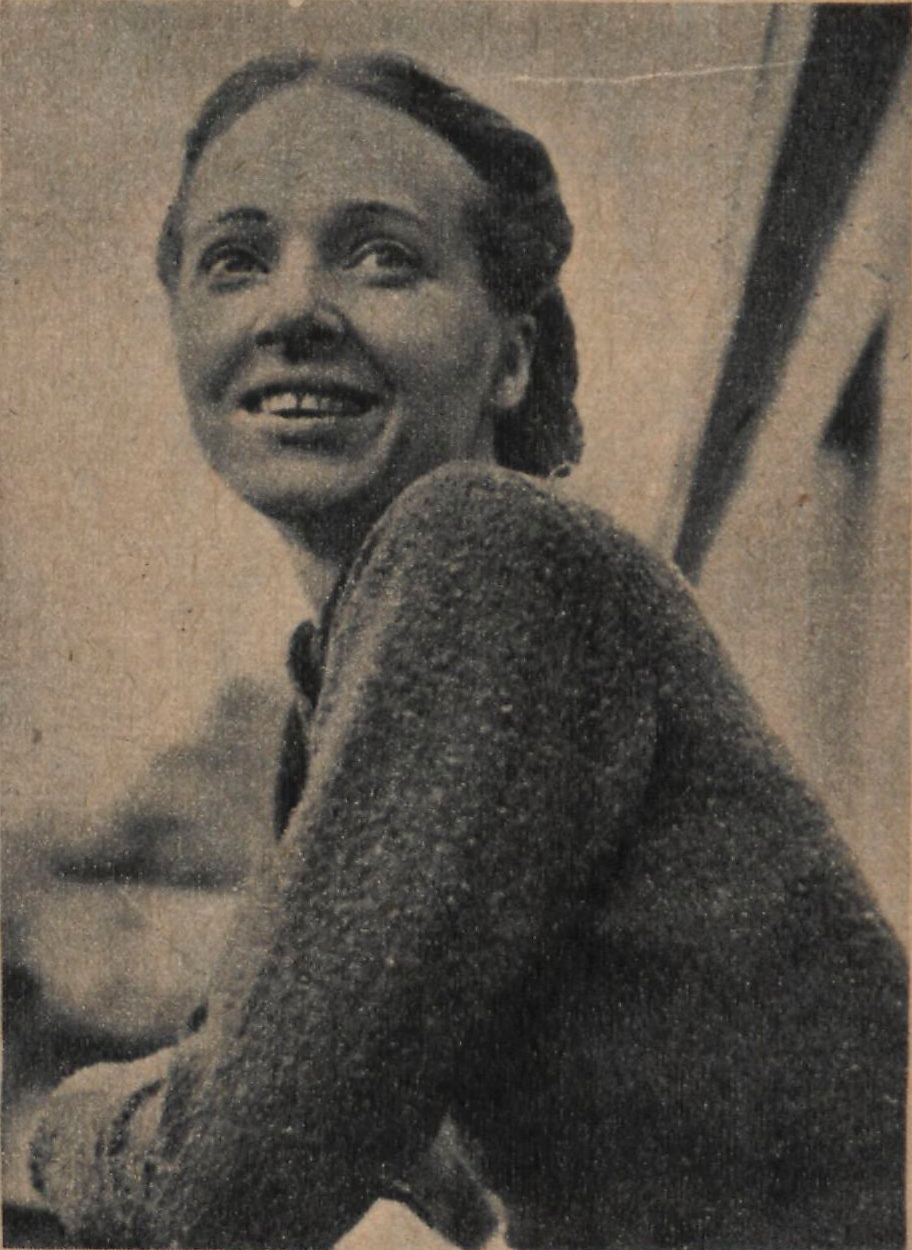
- Born: Marie-Claude Vogel; 3 November 1912; Paris, Third French Republic
- Died: 11 December 1996 (aged 84); Villejuif, Fifth French Republic
- Education: Collège Sévigné
- Era: Fourth and Fifth Republic
- Employer(s): Vu, L'Humanité
- Organization(s): French Resistance, Fédération nationale des déportés et internés résistants et patriotes
- Title: Member of Parliament
- Term: 1945–1958, 1962–1967, 1967–1973
- Political party: Communist
- Criminal penalty: Deported to Auschwitz in 1943
- Criminal status: Transferred to Ravensbrück, stayed after the liberation to care for the sick
- Spouse(s): Paul Vaillant-Couturier; Pierre Villon
- Parents: Lucien Vogel, editor and publisher of Gazette du Bon Ton and Vu (father); Cosette de Brunhoff, first editor-in-chief of the French edition of Vogue (mother)
- Relatives: Sister Nadine Vogel, actress Brother Nicolas Vogel, actor Grandfather Hermann Vogel, illustrator

Marie-Claude Vaillant-Couturier (French: [maʁiklod vajɑ̃kutyʁje]; née Vogel; 3 November 1912 – 11 December 1996) was a French Resistance member in World War II as well as a photojournalist, deported to Auschwitz in 1943. She survived the war and became a Communist politician, elected to Parliament under the Fourth and Fifth Republic.

== Biography ==
=== Photojournalist ===
Vaillant-Couturier's father, Lucien Vogel was an editor who created Vu magazine in 1928. Her mother, Cosette de Brunhoff, whose brother Jean de Brunhoff created Babar the Elephant, was the first editor-in-chief of Vogue Paris.

Vaillant-Couturier became a photojournalist at a time when the trade was overwhelmingly male, which earned her the nickname of "the lady in Rolleiflex". She joined the Association des Écrivains et Artistes Révolutionnaires (AEAR) and in 1934 the Mouvement Jeunes Communistes de France (MJCF), the Communist Youth Movement of France, and in 1936, the Union of the Girls of France. In 1934, she married Paul Vaillant-Couturier, founder of the Republican Association of Ex-servicemen, a communist and chief editor of L'Humanité, who mysteriously died in 1937. She became a photographer for L'Humanité, which she later took over, and got to know Gabriel Péri and Georges Cogniot.

Attached to the Vu team as a photographer but also as a German speaker, she took part in an investigation in Germany into the rise of Nazism and travelled there in 1933, two months after Adolf Hitler came to power. Her report on the Oranienburg and Dachau camps was published upon her return to France. She also reported for Regards, in particular on the International Brigades. The prohibition of L'Humanité in September 1939 due to the Molotov–Ribbentrop Pact, influenced her change of activities.

=== Resistance and deportation ===
Vaillant-Couturier participated in the Resistance and helped produce clandestine publications, including leaflets such as: l'Université Libre (first issued in November 1940); Georges Politzer's pamphlet Sang et Or (Blood and Gold) which presented the theses of the Nazi theorist Alfred Rosenberg (November 1941); and a clandestine edition of L'Humanité with Pierre Villon, her second husband, whom she married in 1949. She strengthened the relationship between the civil resistance (Committee of National Front Intellectuals to fight for the Independence of France) and the military resistance (the Organization spéciale (OS), which later became the Franc-tireurs et Partisans Français (FTPF), French Snipers and Partisans. She even transported explosives.

She was arrested in a trap laid by French police on 9 February 1942 with other Resistance activists, including Jacques Decour, Georges Politzer, Jacques Solomon, and Arthur Dallidet, all of whom were shot by the Nazis at Fort Mont-Valérien. Vaillant-Couturier was interned until 15 February at the Dépôt de la Préfecture, and on 20 March was secretly moved to La Santé Prison – here she stayed until August when she was transferred to Romainville, an internment camp under German authority.

Like her companions, among whom were Danielle Casanova and Heidi Hautval, she was deported to Auschwitz-Birkenau via the internment camp of Compiègne in the convoy of 24 January 1943, said to be the convoy of "31,000" (see the Memorial of the deportees of France to the title of repression, by the La Fondation pour la Mémoire de la Déportation, 2004 and The Convoy of 24 January, by Charlotte Delbo, Midnight Editions, 1965).

Others in the convoy included Danielle Casanova and Madeleine Passot. Singular in its composition, this convoy of 230 women, Resistance members, communists, and Gaullist wives of Resistance members, was illustrated in La Marseillaise by crossing the entrance of the camp of Birkenau. Only 49 of these 230 women returned from the camps after the war.

Vaillant-Couturier was in Auschwitz for 18 months, where she witnessed the genocide of the Jews and the Gypsies and took part in the international clandestine resistance committee of the camp. She was then transferred to the Ravensbrück concentration camp in August 1944. Initially assigned to earthworks, she was transferred to the revier (camp infirmary) because of her knowledge of the German language. Ravensbrück was liberated on 30 April 1945 by the Red Army.

Vaillant-Couturier returned to France on 25 June 1945. During the interim weeks, she devoted herself to the patients' repatriation. According to a 16 June 1945 article in Le Monde, "Each day, this magnificent Frenchwoman makes the rounds, uplifting courage, giving hope where it is often but illusion. The word "holiness" comes to mind when one sees this grand sister of charity near these men and these women who are dying every day."

=== Social and political engagement ===
In 1945, she successively participated in the Provisional Consultative Assembly and the two Constituent Assemblies and was then elected as a French Communist Party (PCF) deputée, member of parliament for the Seine (1946–1958; 1962–1967), then for Val-de-Marne until 1973. She twice was vice-president of the French National Assembly, from 1956 to 1958 and 1967 to 1968, and later became its honorary vice-president.

In 1946, she was elected Secretary-General of the Women's International Democratic Federation and in 1979 was elected vice-president of the Union des femmes française (today Femmes Solidaires). She notably wrote legislative bills for wage equality between men and women, and was also allied with the peace movement.

In 1951, David Rousset filed libel charges and won a suit against the newspaper Les Lettres Françaises. The newspaper, at the time closely related to the PCF, had attacked Rousset after he compared the Soviet Gulags to Nazi concentration camps. The newspaper accused him of being a "Trotskyst falsifier". Marie-Claude Vaillant-Couturier declared at the time: “I indisputably regard the Soviet penitentiary system as the most desirable in the whole world”.

A leading member of the National Federation of Deported and Imprisoned Resistance Fighters and Patriots since its creation in 1945, she became its vice-president, then co-president in 1978. She was also one of the first presenters of l'Amicale d’Auschwitz. A witness at the Nuremberg Trials, she said later that "by telling of the sufferings of those who could not speak any more, I had the feeling that, through my voice, those who they had tortured and exterminated accused their torturers."

She returned from the trials "shocked, worried," “exasperated by the procedure," and particularly denouncing the absence from the dock of the leaders of businesses like Krupp, Siemens, and IG Farben, which had greatly profited from the economic exploitation of deportees. But in spite of these failures, she later emphasized the extent to which defining crimes against humanity was "progress for the human conscience".

In 1964, Paul Rassinier, one of the first Holocaust deniers, and a critic of the verdict of the Nuremberg trials, accused her of having survived the camps by stealing from other prisoners. Marie-Claude Vaillant-Couturier filed suit against these accusations and in the lawsuit against Rassinier the charges were found to be proven. Geneviève de Gaulle-Anthonioz declared to the bar of witnesses "We entered the infirmary buildings not to hide, but because we needed courageous German speaking comrades. […] When we gave back this ration of bread deducted from our own ration, this bulb, we knew that she would give it well to those who needed it most and without any political appreciation […] I know few women as courageous as Marie-Claude, who always gave the feeling that her own life was nothing if she wasn't with the company of her comrades." The court found against Rassinier and the manager of the extreme-right magazine Rivarol.

In December 1964, she presented to the French National Assembly on the concept that there should be no statute of limitations for crimes against humanity, thus opening the way with the ratification, by France in 1968, of the Convention of United Nations on the Non-Applicability of Statutory Limitations to War Crimes and Crimes against Humanity.

In 1987, she called all the civil parties to testify against Klaus Barbie. During the creation of the Foundation for the Memory of the Deportation, in 1990, she was unanimously designated President, then President d' Honneur until her death on 11 December 1996.

=== Honours ===
Légion d'honneur

- Chevalier from 20 December 1945
- Officer from 1981
- Commander from 1995

Combattante Volontaire de la Résistance et de décorations étrangères (Croix de Guerre Tchécoslovaque).

== See also ==
- Convoi des 31000
- International concentration camp committees
- Marie-José Chombart de Lauwe

== Bibliography ==
- Benoit Cazenave: Marie Claude Vaillant Couturier, in: Hier war das Ganze Europa, Brandenburg Memorial Foundation, Metropol Verlag, Berlin 2004, ISBN 3-936411-43-3 (in German)
