= Jean-Louis Cohen =

French architect and architectural historian (1949–2023)

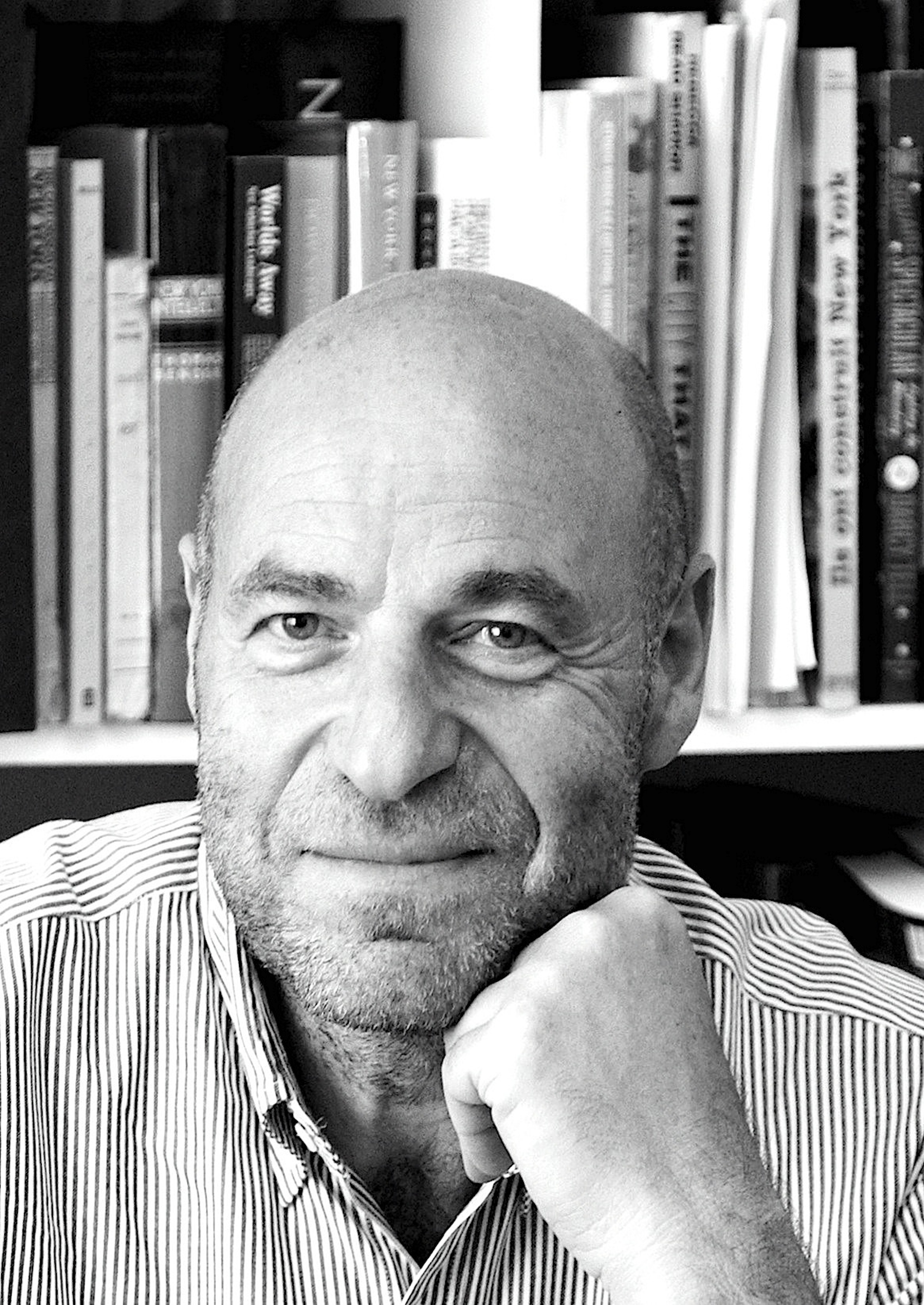
- Cohen in 2009
- Born: 20 July 1949; Paris, France
- Died: 7 August 2023 (aged 74)
- Education: École Spéciale d'Architecture; École des Hautes Études en Sciences Sociales
- Occupations: Architect; Architectural historian
- Awards: Chevalier des Arts et Lettres

Jean-Louis Cohen (20 July 1949 – 7 August 2023) was a French architect and architectural historian specializing in modern architecture and city planning. Since 1994 he had been the Sheldon H. Solow Professor in the History of Architecture at New York University Institute of Fine Arts.

== Life and career ==
Jean-Louis Cohen was born on 20 July 1949 in Paris, grandson of Marcel Cohen, a French scholar of Semitic languages, and son of the biologist and journalist Francis Cohen and the chemical engineer Marie-Élisa Nordmann-Cohen, a survivor of Auschwitz.

He was trained as an architect at the École Spéciale d'Architecture and at the Unité Pédagogique n° 6 in Paris, graduating in 1973 and then receiving his post-graduate diploma Architecte DPLG ( Architecte diplômé par le gouvernement ) in 1979. He received his Ph.D. in Art History from the École des Hautes Études en Sciences Sociales in 1985. After directing the Architectural Research Program at the French Ministry of Housing, from 1983 to 1996 he held a Research Professorship at the School of Architecture Paris-Villemin, and from 1996 to 2004, a Chair in Town-Planning History at the Institut Français d'Urbanisme, University of Paris. In 1994 he was named the Sheldon H. Solow Chair for the History of Architecture at New York University's Institute of Fine Arts, where he taught, and he lectured widely at North American universities.

In 1998 he was appointed to develop the Cité de l'Architecture et du Patrimoine in Paris which opened in 2007. He was director of the project until 2003. In the course of his career he curated many major exhibitions including "The Lost Vanguard", at the Museum of Modern Art (2007); "Scenes of the World to Come", "Architecture in Uniform" and "Building a New New World: Amerikanizm in Russian Architecture" at the Canadian Centre for Architecture (1995, 2011, and 2019); "Paris-Moscou" (1979) and the centennial show "L'aventure Le Corbusier" (1987), both at the Centre Georges Pompidou; "Le Corbusier, tainy tvorchestva," at the Pushkin Museum in Moscow (2012); "Interférences – architecture, Allemagne, France" at the Musée d’art moderne et contemporain de Strasbourg, and the Deutsches Architekturmuseum, Frankfurt (2013); and "Le Corbusier: An Atlas of Modern Landscapes" at New York's Museum of Modern Art in 2013. In 2013 he was also appointed Commissioner of the French Pavilion for the 14th International Architecture Exhibition (Venice Biennale, 2014).

Cohen was made a Chevalier of the Ordre des Arts et des Lettres in 2001. He is the recipient of the 2003 Medal for Architectural Analysis from the Académie d'Architecture and the 2010 Schelling Architecture Theory Prize in architectural theory. Two of his books won the Grand Prix du livre from the Académie d'Architecture—Scènes de la vie future: l'architecture européenne et la tentation de l'Amérique 1893-1960 (1996) and Architecture en uniforme: projeter et construire pour la seconde guerre mondiale (2012). In 2012, he was awarded a Graham Foundation Individual Grant for the publication of his forthcoming history of French Architectural Modernism by Reaktion Books. He was a Fellow of the John S. Guggenheim Foundation for 2013.

In 2013 the Collège de France in Paris appointed him for three years to hold a chair devoted to Architecture and Urban Form. In 2021 he was appointed the inaugural Penelope Visiting Professor in Architectural History at the University of Sydney, Australia.

Jean-Louis Cohen died on 7 August 2023, at the age of 74. The Canadian Centre for Architecture holds his archives.

== Selected exhibitions ==
- Paris-Moscou, Centre Georges Pompidou, Paris, 31 May to 5 November 1979
- L'aventure Le Corbusier, 1887-1965, Centre Georges Pompidou, Paris, 8 October 1987 to 3 January 1988
- Scenes of the World to Come: European Architecture and the American Challenge, 1893–1960, Canadian Centre for Architecture, Montreal, 14 June 1995 to 14 September 1995
- The Lost Vanguard: Soviet Modernist Architecture, 1922–32 Photographs by Richard Pare, Museum of Modern Art, New York, 18 July to 29 October 2007
- Architecture in Uniform: Designing and Building for the Second World War, Canadian Centre for Architecture, Montreal, 13 April 2011 to 18 September 2011
- Le Corbusier: Secrets of Creativity: Between Painting and Architecture, Pushkin State Museum of Fine Arts, Moscow, 25 September 2012 to 18 November 2012
- Interférences/Interferenzen: Architecture Allemagne-France, 1800-2000, Musée d’art moderne et contemporain de Strasbourg, 30 March to 21 July 2013 and Deutsches Architekturmuseum, Frankfurt, 3 October 2013 to 12 January 2014
- Le Corbusier: An Atlas of Modern Landscapes, Museum of Modern Art, New York, 15 June to 23 September 2013
- Building a New New World: Amerikanizm in Russian Architecture, Canadian Centre for Architecture, Montreal, 12 November 2019 to 26 July 2020

== Selected publications ==
- Le Corbusier and the Mystique of the USSR, Theories and Projects for Moscow, 1928-1936. Princeton: Princeton University Press, 1992.
- Des fortifs au périf, Paris: les seuils de la ville. Paris: Picard, 1992 (with André Lortie).
- Scenes of the World to Come: European Architecture and the American Challenge, 1893-1960. Montreal: Canadian Centre for Architecture; Paris: Flammarion, 1995.
- L'architecture d'André Lurçat (1894-1970); l'autocritique d'un moderne. Liege: Pierre Mardaga, 1995.
- Les Années 30, l'architecture et les arts de l'espace entre industrie et nostalgie. Paris: Éditions du Patrimoine, 1997 (ed.).
- Encyclopédie Perret. Paris: Éditions du Patrimoine/Institut français d'architecture, 2002 (ed., with Joseph Abram and Guy Lambert).
- Casablanca, Colonial Myths and Architectural Ventures. New York: The Monacelli Press, 2002 (with Monique Eleb).
- Alger, paysage urbain et architectures 1800-2000. Paris: Éditions de l'Imprimeur, 2003 (ed., with Nabila Oulebsir and Youcef Kanoun).
- Le Corbusier, la planète comme chantier. Paris: Textuel, 2005.
- Above Paris, the Aerial Survey of Roger Henrard. New York: Princeton Architectural Press, 2006.
- Liquid Stone, New Architecture in Concrete. New York: Princeton Architectural Press, 2006 (ed., with G. Martin Moeller, Jr.).
- Mies van der Rohe. Paris: Hazan; Basel, Berlin, Boston: Birkhäuser, 2007.
- "Radical Relics: Architecture and the Politics of Modernization in Soviet Russia." In Richard Pare: The Lost Vanguard: Russian Modernist Architecture 1922-1932. New York: The Monacelli Press, 2007.
- New York. Paris: Mazenod, 2008.
- Architecture in Uniform: Designing and Building for the Second World War. Montreal: Canadian Centre for Architecture; Paris: Hazan, 2011.
- The Future of Architecture. Since 1889. London: Phaidon, 2012.
- Le Corbusier’s secret Laboratory, From Painting to Architecture, edited by Jean-Louis Cohen with Staffan Ahrenberg, Hatje Cantz, 2013
- Le Corbusier: an Atlas of Modern Landscapes. New York: Museum of Modern Art, 2013.
- Interférences/Interferenzen: Architecture Allemagne-France, 1800-2000. Strasbourg: Musées de la Ville de Strasbourg, 2013 (ed., with Hartmut Frank).
- L'Architecture au XXe siècle en France, modernité et continuité. Paris: Hazan, 2014.
- France: Modern Architectures in History. London: Reaktion Books, 2015.
- Architecture, modernité, modernisation. Paris: Fayard, 2017.
- Building a New New World: Amerikanizm in Russian Architecture. New Haven: Yale University Press, 2020.
- Articles published in Cahiers d’Art: Architecture and the Museum: a troubled relationship, (Cahiers d’Art, Ellsworth Kelly, 2012. p. 82-87), The Jacques Lipchitz studio of Le Corbusier, (Cahiers d’Art, Rosemarie Trockel 2013, p. 154-165), Frank Gehry in Malibu, the Ron Davis studio and residence, (Cahiers d’Art, Gabriel Orozco, 2018, p. 148-158), Miró with José Luis Sert: a Mediterranean style of hospitality (Cahiers d’Art, Miró, 2018, p. 108-114)
- Frank Gehry, Catalogue raisonné of the Drawings, volume 1, by Jean-Louis Cohen, Cahiers d’Art, 2020
- Frank Gehry, The Masterpieces, by Jean-Louis Cohen, coedition Cahiers d’Art Flammarion, 2021

== Decorations ==
- Officer of the Order of Arts and Letters (2015)
