= Richard Pare =

English photographer

Richard Pare (born 20 January 1948 in Portsmouth, England) is an English photographer known for his work documenting Soviet modernist architecture. He was born in Portsmouth, England, on 20 January 1948. He studied graphic design and photography at Winchester and Ravensbourne College of Art before attending the Art Institute of Chicago. He received a Master of Fine Arts from Chicago in 1973. He was the founding curator of the Photography Collection of the Canadian Centre for Architecture.

Richard Pare curated the exhibition "Photography and Architecture: 1839–1939" at the Canadian Centre for Architecture in 1982. Exhibitions of his photographs include "Lost Vanguard: Soviet Modernist Architecture, 1922–32" (2007) and "Le Corbusier: An Atlas of Modern Landscapes" at the Museum of Modern Art (2013).

== Selected publications ==
- Richard Pare (1982). Photography and Architecture, 1839–1939. Montréal: Canadian Centre for Architecture; [New York]: Callaway Editions.
- Richard Pare (1996). The Colours of Light: Tadao Ando Architecture. London: Phaidon.
- Richard Pare (2007). The Lost Vanguard: Russian Modernist Architecture 1922-1932. New York: The Monacelli Press.
- Richard Pare and Jean-Louis Cohen (2018). Le Corbusier: The Built Work. New York: The Monacelli Press.
- Richard Pare (2018). Tadao Ando: The Colours of Light, Volume 1. London: Phaidon. (2nd edition)

== See also ==
- Russian avant-garde
- List of photographers
