= Louise Magadur =

French resistance fighter, Communist and Holocaust survivor

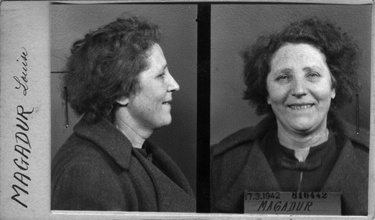
- Born: 21 April 1899
- Died: 12 May 1992 (aged 93); Pont-Croix
- Citizenship: France
- Occupation: Hairdresser
- Organization(s): Communist Party; French Resistance

Louise Magadur (21 April 1899 - 12 May 1992) was a French resistance fighter, Communist and Holocaust survivor.

== Biography ==
Magadur was born on 21 April 1899 in Pont-Croix in Finistère, France. Her father was a miller and she was the fourth child of a family of six. She learnt to be a seamstress and moved to Paris in 1924, where she offered hairdressings lessons. In 1942 she opened a hairdressing salon in the 12th arrondissement.

Prior to the outbreak of the Second World War, Magadur was active in the Communist Party. She became a member of the National Front for the Fight for the Liberation and Independence of France (Front National) and was an active member of the Resistance. Her salon became the respectable cover for activities including leaflet distribution, letter exchange and the creation of disguises for members. She also encouraged others to join the fight, including Suzanne Lasne.

On 9 March 1942, she was arrested by the French police and was held in solitary confinement until 24 August 1942. She was then sent to Fort Romainville, which was under German administration; there she discovered the news that both her mother and sister had died. From Romainville she was transported on 24 January 1943 in what became known as the convoi des 31,000 (Convoy 31000) - all of whom were sent to Auschwitz. Many of those in the convoy were Communist Party members. On 4 August 1944 she was deported to Ravensbrück. On 5 March 1945 she was moved to Mauthausen.

Magadur was released from Mauthausen on 22 April 1945. Six months after her release, Magadur was able to reopen her hair salon, despite the fact that she found readjusting to life difficult. By the time of her death, she was the oldest survivor of 'Convoy 31,000' and was the only woman who was transported on it, born before 1900, to return.

== Legacy ==
There is a playground dedicated to Louise Magadur in her hometown of Pont-Croix, which was named as a tribute to her.

== See also ==
- Convoi des 31000
