= Revier (Nazi concentration camps) =

Medical facility in Nazi concentration camps

Revier was a term used in Nazi camps to designate the medical facility for inmates. It was abbreviated from the German word Krankenrevier (infirmary). The Reviers were managed by Kapos who most often did not have medical training. The conditions in reviers varied drastically, in most camps, a trip to the Revier was virtually a death sentence.

== Extermination camps ==
In extermination camps (as well as in many labor camps, where extermination through labor was practiced) the name revier was immediately associated with death in many respects. Death was to be expected immediately upon entrance to a revier: An "insufficiently" sick person could be classified as malingerer, who was avoiding labor. The penalty was death. Even being admitted into the revier gave little hope: while the medical personnel (inmates) could be highly qualified doctors, they could not offer any help beyond very basic first aid. For example, the supply of medicine was very limited. In addition, rations for the sick were lower than for the inmates who could work and no hygiene was maintained. Finally, at any moment the residents of a revier were subject to extermination for various reasons (e.g. a threat of an epidemic, due to overcrowding or deemed incurably sick).
