= Marie-Élisa Nordmann-Cohen =

French chemist and resistance fighter

- Born: November 4, 1910; Paris, France
- Died: August 5, 1993 (aged 82); Paris, France
- Other name: Marie-Élisa Nordmann
- Occupation: Chemist
- Employers: Université Paris-Sud; Sorbonne Université; Université de Paris
- Known for: Chemistry, Resistance fighting
- Spouse: Francis Cohen
- Children: 4

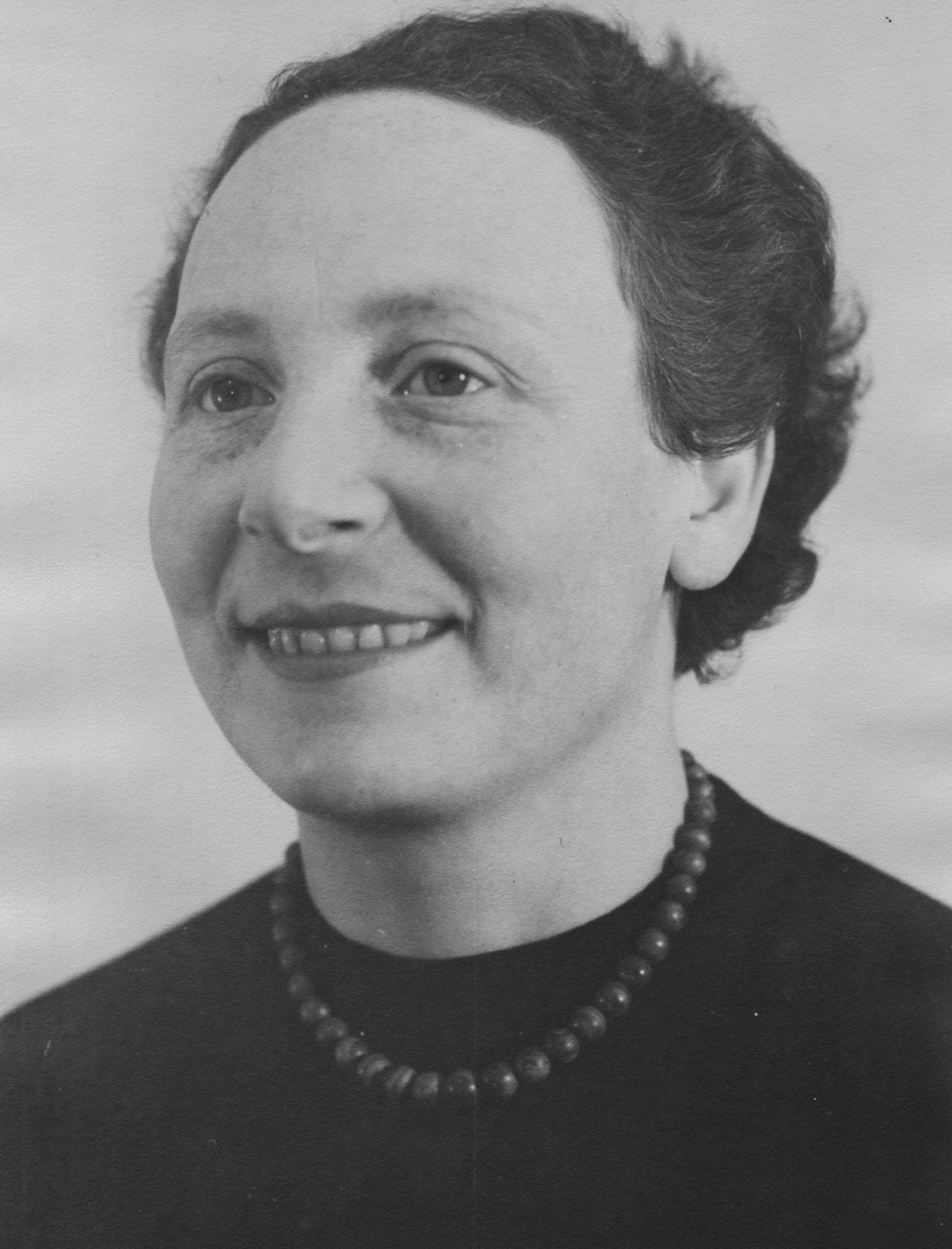
Marie-Élisa Nordmann in 1950

Marie-Élisa Nordmann-Cohen (4 November 1910 – 15 August 1993) was a French chemist, antifascist, and communist member of the French Resistance during World War II.

== Biography ==
Marie-Élisa Nordmann was a student of physicist Paul Langevin, who supervised her doctoral studies in chemistry before the war.

Beginning in 1940, she distributed clandestine publications from the intellectual resistance group Université Libré. During this time, she became close with France Bloch-Sérazin, the daughter of Jean-Richard Bloch. In 1943 she was deported to Auschwitz. Though she survived, Bloch-Sérazin did not. After the war, she helped found and became president of l'Amicale des anciens déportés d'Auschwitz (The Association of Auschwitz Deportees).

She and Frédéric Joliot-Curie helped establish the French Alternative Energies and Atomic Energy Commission, where she was Secretary of the Scientific Council. Afterwards, she worked at the Sorbonne, and later at the Université d’Orsay.

She married journalist Francis Cohen. She died on 15 August 1993. Her daughter Isabelle Cohen published a poetic biography of Marie-Elisa Nordmann in 2024 titled Revenir Raconter (Returning Retelling), which was widely acclaimed by the French media.

== Honours ==
- Croix de Guerre 1939–1945
- Officer of the Legion of Honour
