= Fort de Romainville =

French fort used as a Nazi concentration camp in World War II

- Transit camp
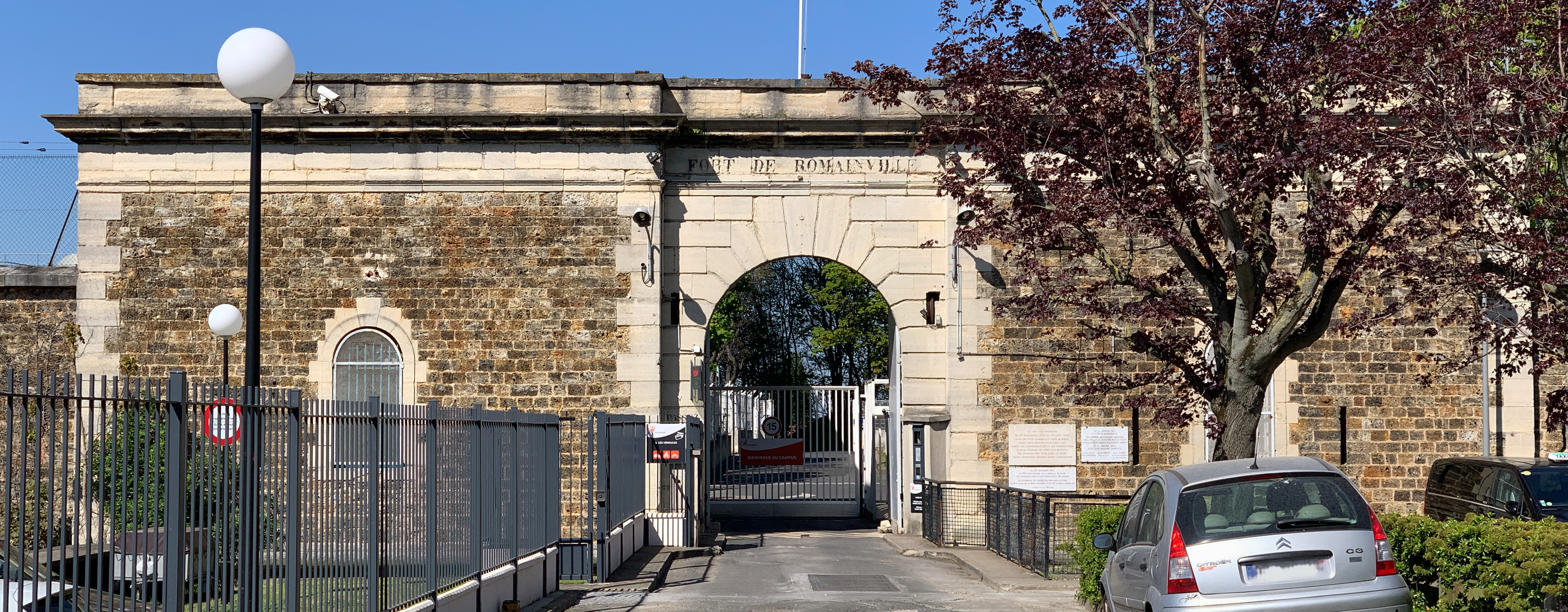
- Entrance archway

- Location within Paris and inner ring Location within France
- Coordinates: 48°53′06″N 2°25′22″E
- Location: Les Lilas, Île-de-France; Occupied France
- Built by: Second French Republic
- Operated by: SS
- Commandant: Bickenbach
- Original use: Military fort for the protection of Paris
- First built: 1844–48
- Operational: October 1940 – 19 August 1944
- Inmates: French Resistance, French communists
- Killed: 152
- Notable inmates: Pierre Georges, Danielle Casanova, Marie-Claude Vaillant-Couturier, Hélène Solomon-Langevin, Charlotte Delbo, Eddie Chapman

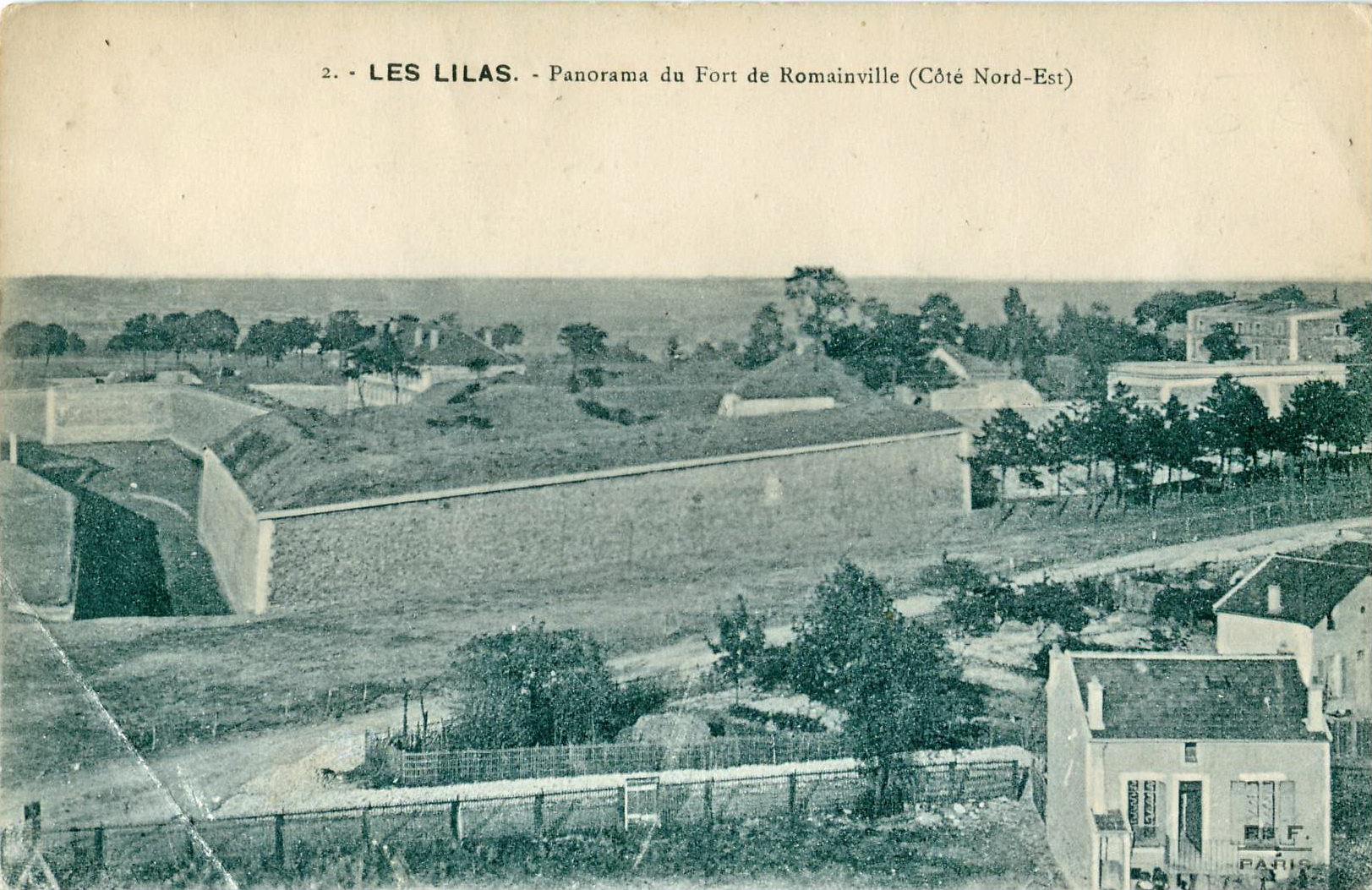
Panorama of the Fort de Romainville, at the beginning of the 20th century

Fort de Romainville, (in English, Fort Romainville) was built in France in the 1830s and was used as a Nazi concentration camp in World War II.

== Use in World War II ==
Fort de Romainville was a Nazi prison and transit camp, located in the outskirts of Paris. The Fort was taken in 1940 by the German military and transformed into a prison. From there, resistants and hostages were directed to the Nazi concentration camps. People were interned there before being deported to Auschwitz, Ravensbrück, Buchenwald or Dachau concentration camps; the deportees comprised 3,900 women and 3,100 men.

In the Fort itself, 152 persons were executed by firing squad. A few escaped, such as Pierre Georges, alias "Colonel Fabien." From her cell, Danielle Casanova motivated and encouraged her comrades to confront their torturers. From February 1944, the Fort held primarily female prisoners (resistants and hostages), who were jailed, executed or redirected to the camps. At liberation in August 1944, many abandoned corpses were found in the Fort's yard.

== Gallery ==
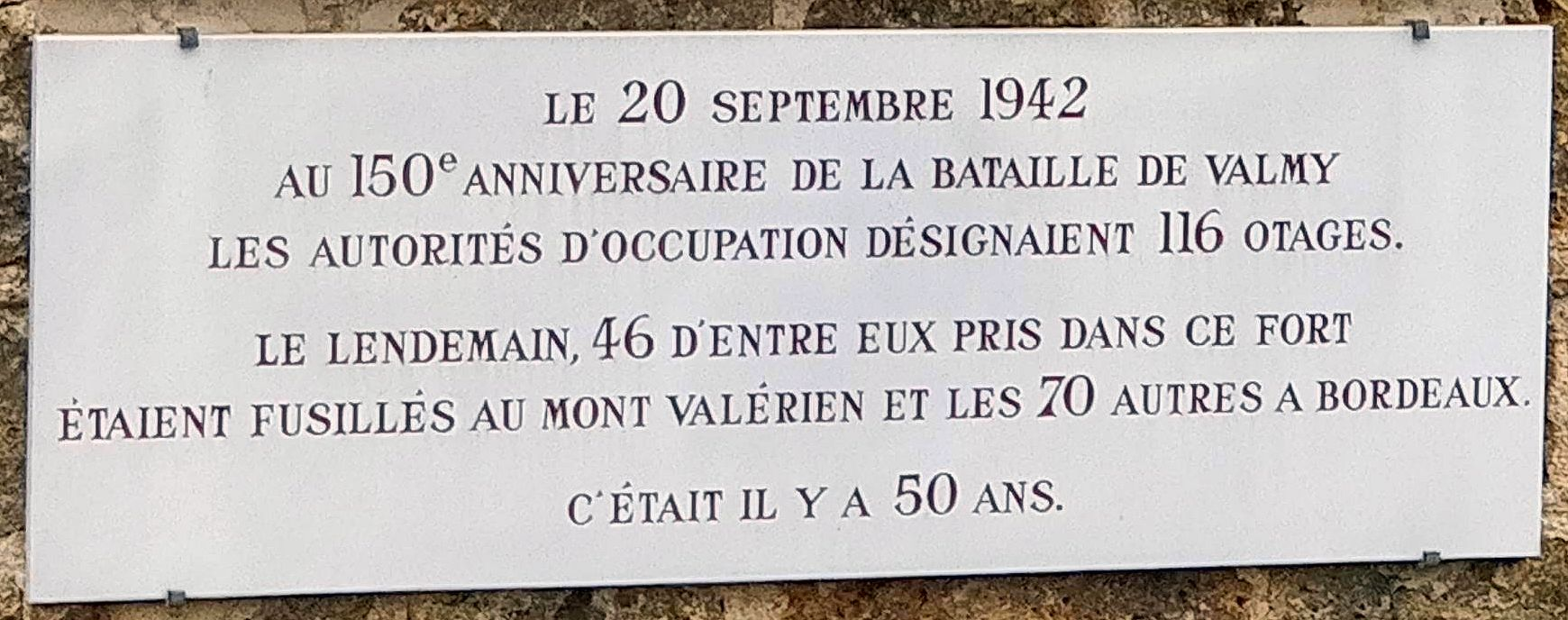
Memorial plaque to the hostages shot at Romainville

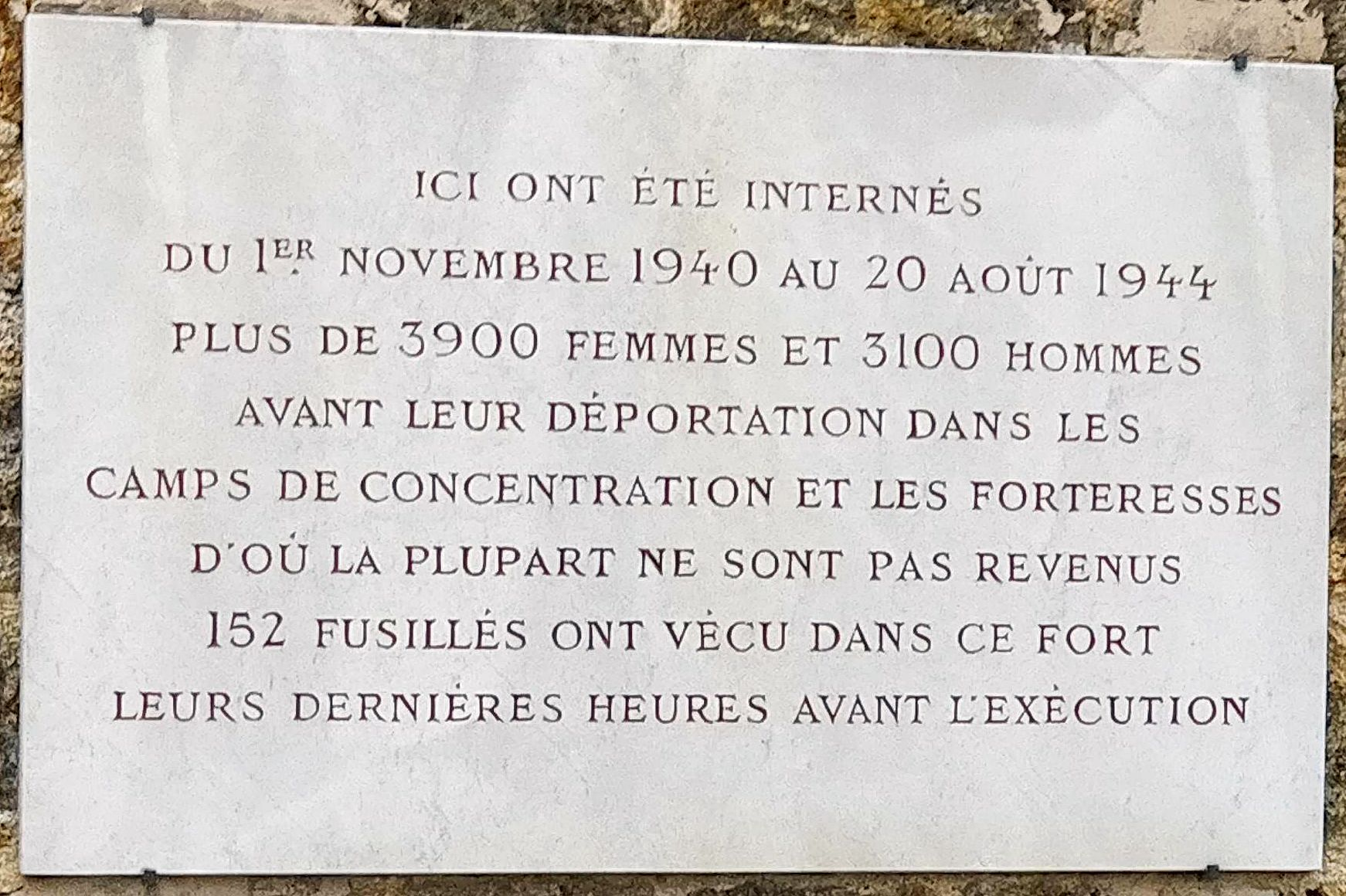
Memorial plaque to the internees deported and the prisoners shot at Romainville

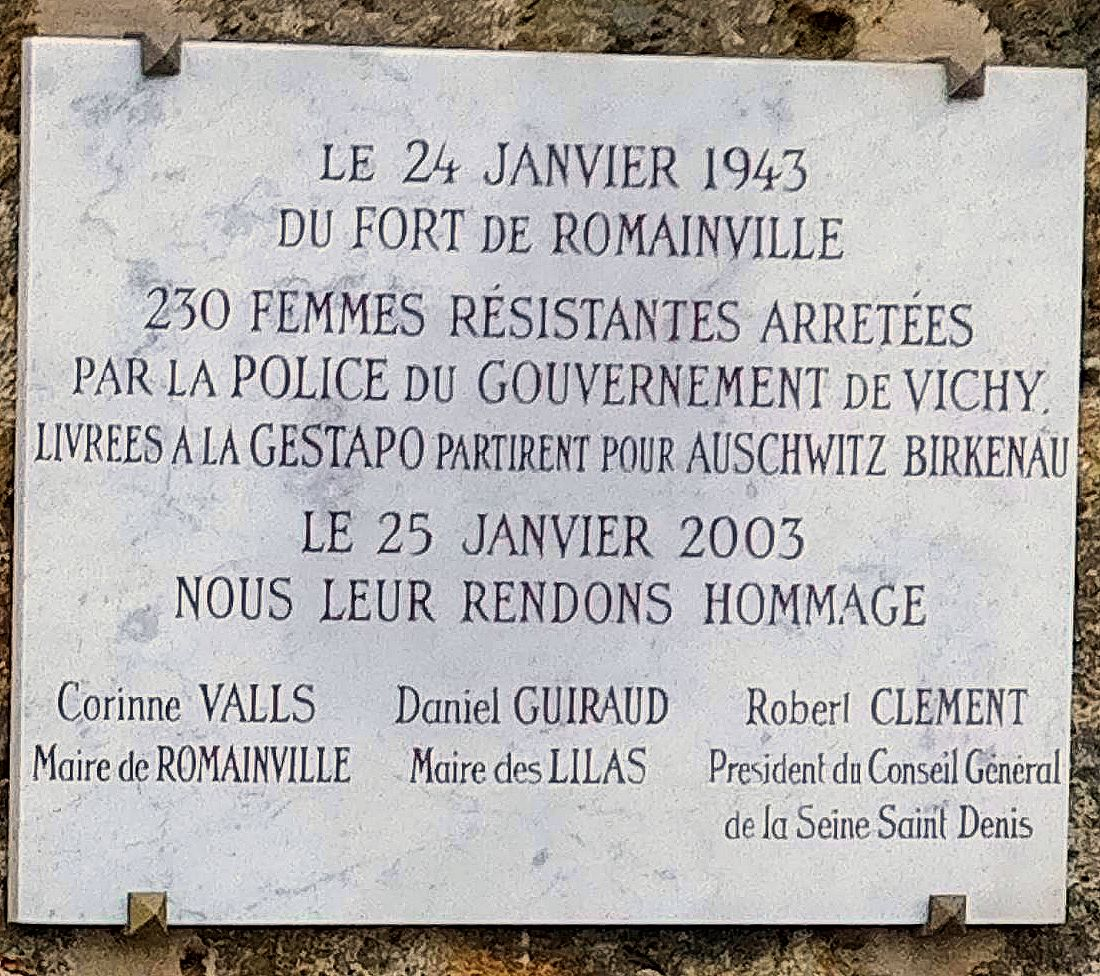
Memorial plaque to women of the Resistance sent to Auschwitz from Romainville

== See also ==
- Vichy France
- Military history of France during World War II
- World War II
- Jews outside Europe under Nazi occupation
- Eddie Chapman aka Agent Zigzag
- Anthony Faramus
- Liberation of Paris
- Concentration camps in France
- Italian concentration camps
- Nazi concentration camps
- Nazi concentration camp list
- Concentration and internment camps list
- The Holocaust
