= Charlotte Delbo =

French writer (1913–1985)

- Delbo with her camp number tattoo visible
- Born: 10 August 1913; Vigneux-sur-Seine, Essonne, France
- Died: 1 March 1985 (aged 71); Paris, France
- Occupations: Playwright; memoirist
- Writing career
- Subject: Holocaust
- Notable work: Auschwitz and After

Charlotte Delbo (10 August 1913 – 1 March 1985) was a French writer chiefly known for her memoirs of her time as a prisoner in Auschwitz, where she was sent for her activities as a member of the French Resistance.

== Early life ==
Charlotte Delbo was born in Vigneux-sur-Seine, Essonne near Paris in 1913, to Charles Delbo from the French department of Sarthe, and Ermini (née Morero) who moved from Italy to France at the age of 18-years.

She gravitated toward theater and politics in her youth, joining the French Young Communist Women's League in 1932. She met and married George Dudach two years later. Later in the decade she went to work for actor and theatrical producer Louis Jouvet and was with his company in Buenos Aires when Wehrmacht forces invaded and occupied France in 1940.

She could have waited to return when Philippe Pétain, leader of the collaborationist Vichy regime, established special courts in 1941 to deal with members of the resistance. One sentenced a friend of hers, a young architect named Andre Woog, to death. "I can't stand being safe while others are guillotined", she told Jouvet. "I won't be able to look anyone in the eye."

== Resistance and arrest ==
Accordingly, she returned to Paris with Dudach, who was already active in the resistance as the assigned courier for the internationally famous poet Louis Aragon. The couple spent much of that winter printing and distributing pamphlets and other anti-Nazi Germany reading material. They became part of the group around communist philosopher Georges Politzer, and took an active role in publishing the underground journal Lettres Françaises.

On 2 March 1942, police followed a careless courier to their apartment, and arrested George and Charlotte. The courier was able to escape from a back window.

== Time in camps ==
Dudach was shot on the morning of 23 May after being allowed to bid his wife farewell. Delbo was held in transit camps near Paris for the rest of the year; then on 23 January 1943 she and 229 other Frenchwomen, imprisoned for their resistance activities, were put on a train for the Auschwitz concentration camp, in what became known as Convoi des 31000. It was one of only a few convoys of non-Jewish prisoners from France to that camp (most were sent to the Mauthausen-Gusen concentration camp or other camps for political prisoners) and the only convoy of women. Only 49 returned; she wrote about this experience later in Le convoi du 24 janvier (published in English as Convoy to Auschwitz).

Other Frenchwomen of note on that convoy were Marie-Claude Vaillant-Couturier, daughter of magazine editor Lucien Vogel and Communist Resistance activist, who would later testify at the Nuremberg Trials of war criminals; France Rondeaux, a cousin of André Gide; Vittoria "Viva" Daubeuf, daughter of Italian socialist leader and future deputy prime minister Pietro Nenni; Simone Sampaix, daughter of the editor of L'Humanité; Marie "Mai" Politzer, wife of sociologist Georges Politzer; Adelaide Hautval, a doctor who would save many inmates and testify against Nazi medical atrocities; and Hélène Solomon-Langevin, daughter of physicist Paul Langevin. It was partly thanks to the presence of several scientists among the prisoners (others were Laure Gatet and Madeleine Dechavassine) that a few, Delbo included, were selected to farm kok-saghyz and survived.

Most of the women on the convoy, however, were poor and uneducated and nearly all Communists. One of their number, Danielle Casanova, would be eulogized as a Communist martyr and role model for many years. Delbo later debunked much of the Casanova legend. She paid more tribute to her working-class friends such as Lulu Thevenin, Christiane "Cecile" Charua (later married to historian and Mauthausen survivor Jose Borras), Jeannette "Carmen" Serre, Madeleine Doiret, and Simone "Poupette" Alizon, many of whom figure prominently in her memoirs.

The women were in Auschwitz, first at Birkenau and later the Raisko satellite camp, for about a year before being sent to Ravensbrück and finally released to the custody of the Swedish chapter of the International Red Cross in 1945 as the war drew to a close. After recuperating, Delbo returned to France.

== Post-war ==
She wrote her major work, the trilogy published as Auschwitz and After ("None of Us Will Return", "Useless Knowledge" and "The Measure of Our Days,") in the years immediately after the war but held off on publishing the first part until 1965 to give the book the test of time, because of her fear that it would not do justice to the greatest tragedy humanity had known. The final volumes were published in 1970 and 1971.

The play "Qui Rapportera Ces Paroles?" (Who Will Carry the Word?) is about Delbo's experience at Birkenau.

In later years, she abandoned Communism, influenced like other resistor-survivors (David Rousset and Jorge Semprún among them) by the exposure of concentration camps in the Soviet Union.

Her political views remained strongly left: during the Algerian War she published "Les belles lettres", a collection of petitions protesting colonial French policy. She never remarried.

During the 1960s, she worked for the United Nations and philosopher Henri Lefebvre, who had worked with Politzer before the war.

She died of lung cancer in 1985.

=== Commemoration ===
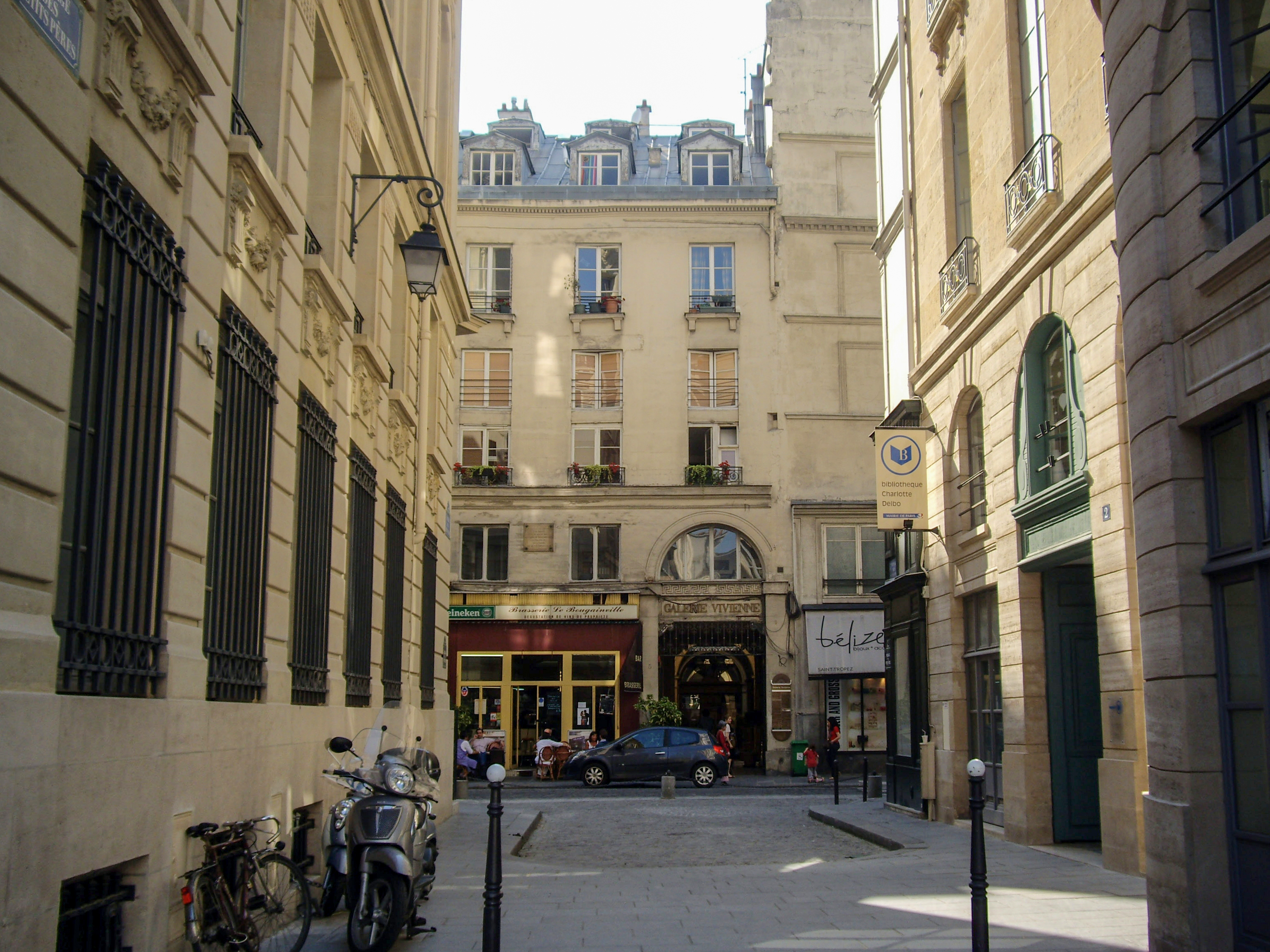
Charlotte Delbo library is on the right.

A library in Paris is named after her: Bibliotheque Charlotte Delbo.

== Work ==
While little-known by most readers, within the Holocaust-literature community Delbo is widely respected and her work is beginning to be assigned as part of most college-level courses on the subject.

This relative obscurity is partly due to her work only recently having appeared in English translation; also because the Holocaust-literature canon has tended to focus on writers such as Anne Frank, Primo Levi and Elie Wiesel who have been in print for far longer.

But her technique were a hurdle. Like Tadeusz Borowski, another non-Jew sent to Auschwitz for resistance activities, she chose a less comfortable way of relating her experience than the more straightforward narratives of Levi and Wiesel.

Inga Clendinnen notes that Delbo registered her "deepest subjective experience", the interior monologue, the terror and despair in violent moments in the camps.

Her guiding principle was, as she regularly described it, Essayez de regarder. Essayez pour voir, or roughly translated when it occurs as a refrain in her work, "Try to look. Just try and see."

Delbo's work has been very influential already for a number of other scholars in addition to Haft and Lamot, such as Lawrence L. Langer, Nicole Thatcher, Geoffrey Hartman, Marlene Heinemann, Robert Skloot, Kali Tal, Erin Mae Clark, Joan M. Ringelheim, Debarati Sanyal, and many others. Feminists are showing an increasing interest in her work, though Delbo did not identify herself as a feminist.

=== English translations ===
A limited-edition English translation of Aucun de nous ne reviendra (None of Us Will Return), translated by John Githens, was published in 1968 by Grove Press.

A translation of Qui Rapportera Ces Paroles? (Who Will Carry the Word?) was completed by Dr. Cynthia Haft and appears in 'The Theatre of the Holocaust' edited by Robert Skloot and published in 1982 by the University of Wisconsin Press. A translation of the whole Auschwitz and After trilogy, by Rosette C. Lamont, was only published in the U.S. in 1995, ten years after the author's death.

Delbo is one of the female French Resistance members in the book A Train in Winter by British biographer Caroline Moorehead, published in 2011.

== Bibliography ==
- Auschwitz and After, Yale University Press,(1997), ISBN 0-300-07057-8
  - None of Us Will Return
  - Useless Knowledge
  - The Measure of Our Days
- Le convoi de 24 janvier (Convoy to Auschwitz), Northeastern University Press, (1997), ISBN 1-55553-313-2
- Who Will Carry the Word
- Les belles lettres
- Days and Memory
