= Danielle Casanova (disambiguation) =

Danielle Casanova (1909–1943) was a French Communist activist and resistance fighter during the Second World War, who died in deportation to Auschwitz.

Danielle Casanova may also refer to:

- Rue Danielle Casanova, Paris, named after the resistance fighter
- MS Danielle Casanova, cruise ferry commissioned in 2002 by SNCM, currently sailing under the colors of Corsica Linea
