= Emma Choury =

French communist, activist and trade unionist (1916–2001)

- Born: Emma Perini; 14 April 1916; Ajaccio, Corsica, France
- Died: 29 November 2001 (aged 85); 12th arrondissement of Paris, France
- Resting place: Piana, Corsica
- Occupation: Dentist
- Political party: French Communist Party
- Spouse: Maurice Choury (m. 1936; died 1969)
- Relatives: Danielle Casanova and Renée Perini (sisters)

Emma Choury (née Perini 14 April 1916 – 29 November 2001) was a French communist activist and trade unionist from Corsica. She was an officer of the Union of Communist Students and the Union of French Women in the 1930s and 1940s, then became head of the dental surgeons' union in 1949.

== Biography ==
Born on 14 April 1916, Emma Perini grew up in a family of republican teachers in Ajaccio, Corsica. Her father was a communist sympathiser and a member of the Comité de vigilance des intellectuels antifascistes. The youngest of five children, she had a brother and three sisters, including Danielle Casanova and Renée Perini.

Following in her sisters' footsteps, she studied medicine in Paris and joined the student communist movement. In 1936, she married Maurice Choury, who had been the leader of the Jeunesses Communistes for two years and whom she supported until his death. From 1937, she was active in the dental section of the Federal Union of Students, which became the Union of Communist Students (UEC) in 1939. She sat on the first board of the UEC.

In 1946, she was a board member of the Bordeaux and Corsica section of the Union of French Women, the women's organ of the French Communist Party (PCF) that grew out of the underground women's committees founded by her sister Danielle during the Nazi occupation of France. In 1949, Choury became a dental surgeon and found work in the 5th arrondissement of Paris. She joined the management of the dental surgeons' union.

She died on 29 November 2001 in the 12th arrondissement of Paris. A tribute was paid to her by the PCF, its president Robert Hue and its national secretary Marie-George Buffet. She was buried in the family vault in Piana, Corsica, in the presence of the party's National Council.

== Bibliography ==
- Pennetier, Claude (4 April 2021) [25 October 2008]. "CASANOVA Danielle [née PÉRINI Vincentella, épouse CASANOVA, dite]". Le Maitron (in French).
- Pennetier, Claude (2 January 2022) [25 October 2008]. "CHOURY Emma [née PÉRINI Emma]". Le Maitron (in French).
