= Janine Jambu =

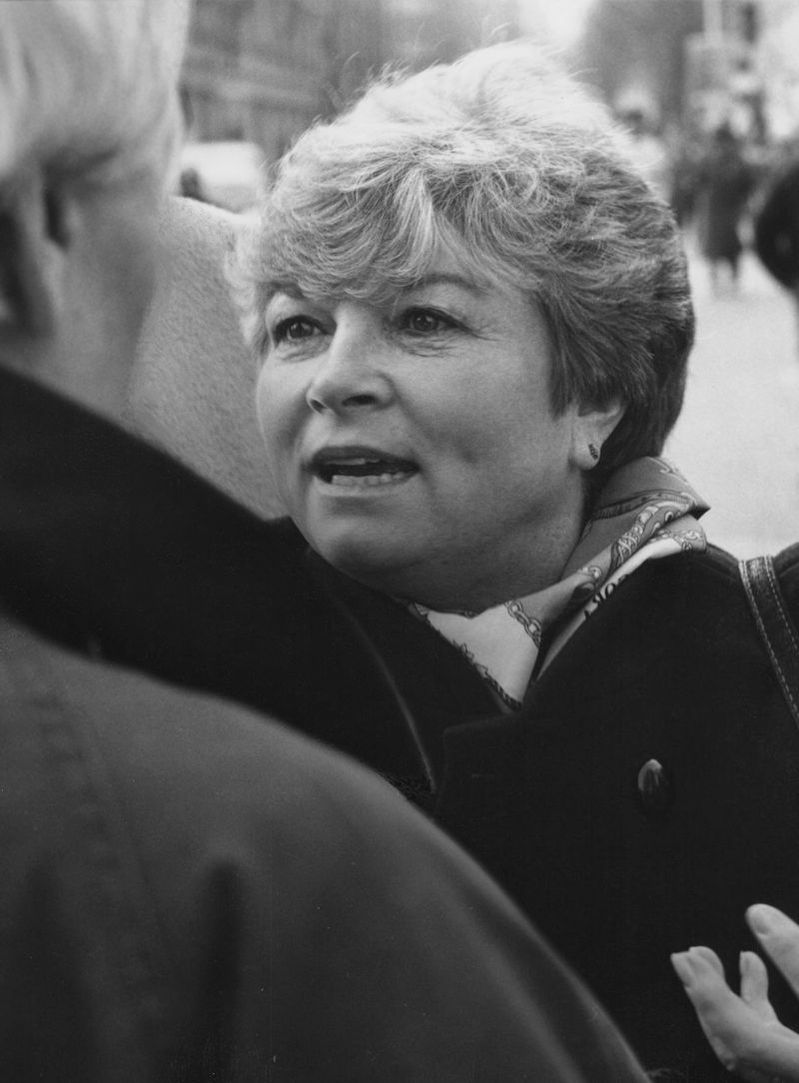

Member of the National Assembly for Hauts-de-Seine's 11th constituency
- In office 2 April 1993 – 19 June 2007
- Preceded by: Philippe Bassinet
- Succeeded by: Marie-Hélène Amiable

Personal details
- Born: Janine Lucienne Jambu; 18 November 1942 Berre-l'Étang, Bouches-du-Rhône, France
- Died: 17 April 2012 (aged 69) Bagneux, Hauts-de-Seine, France
- Party: PCF

Janine Lucienne Jambu (18 November 1942 – 17 April 2012) was a French activist and politician of the French Communist Party. She was a municipal councillor of Colombes and general councillor of Bagneux, Hauts-de-Seine before being elected deputy for Hauts-de-Seine's 11th constituency in the National Assembly from 1993 to 2007.

== Early life ==
Jambu was born in Berre-l'Étang, Bouches-du-Rhône on 18 November 1942, to the construction technician Adrien Jambu and Julienne Auber. She had an older brother and obtained her Baccalauréat in school. In 1959, Jambu began working as an office worker at the Ferodo company in Saint-Ouen.

== Political career ==
Influenced by the activism her brother was carrying out, she joined the Mouvement Jeunes Communistes de France in 1959 at an initiative for peace in Algeria. Jambu sat in the national office of the organisation in 1961 as well as the Union of Young Girls of France (UJFF). She became a member of the French Communist Party (PCF) in 1962. Jambu became a member of the Seine-Ouest Communist Federal Committee in 1964 and later of the Hauts-de-Seine Federal Committee. She was sent to a training school in Moscow by the PCF in approximately 1965 and was appointed the UJFF's deputy federal secretary in 1968. Jambu spoke at the 22nd Congress of the French Communist Party at L'Île-Saint-Denis in February 1976. She was also an activist for the General Confederation of Labour and for the National Housing Confederation.

In 1969, she became a municipal councillor of Colombes and general councillor of Bagneux, Hauts-de-Seine from 1982 to 1993. Jambu was mayor of Bagneux between 1985 and 2004. After the invalidation of her election in March 2001 by the Conseil d'État, she won election for the final time in October 2002. Jambu resigned the mayorship effective 15 May 2004, being succeeded by her assistant Marie-Hélène Amiable. She was elected deputy for Hauts-de-Seine's 11th constituency in the National Assembly and took up her seat on 2 April 1993. Janine aligned her actions with the Union of the Left, and focused on the right to housing, gender equality, Armenian genocide recognition, peace and disarmament. She was a member of the Commission for Cultural, Family and Social Affairs, the Economic Affairs Committee, the Committee on Economic, Environmental and Territorial Affairs and the National Defence and Armed Forces Committee. Jambu retired from the National Assembly on 19 June 2007, and was succeeded by Amibale.

She was given a four-month suspended prison sentence and five years of ineligibility for "illegal taking of interests" in a case involving subsidies to local associations (two sports associations and two integration associations) by the Tribunal judiciaire de Nanterre in May 2006.

== Death and legacy ==
She died of a sudden heart attack in Bagneux on 17 April 2012. Jambu's funeral took place at Cimetière parisien de Bagneux on 24 April 2012, attended by between 2,000 and 3,000 people. The Janine-Jambu sports hall opened in 2013 in the southern district of Bagneux was named for her.
