= Guy Besse =

French philosopher and politician

Guy Besse (25 November 1919 – 16 February 2004) was a French philosopher and politician, a member of the executive of the French Communist Party (PCF).

== Biography ==
A member of the Responsible du Front National while a student in Lyon under the pseudonym of César, he was part of the Mouvement Jeunes Communistes de France during the Resistance, and was the national secretary of the Union of Communist Students from 1944 to 1945.

Agrégé professor of philosophy, he graduated from lycée in Bourges, then studied at the University of Caen Lower Normandy, the Sorbonne and the French National Centre for Scientific Research.

He published a number of socialist texts for many years, and in March 1970, replaced Roger Garaudy as the head of the Centre d’études et de recherches marxistes.

A member of the Central Committee of the PCF from 1956, he joined its Political Bureau 11 years later as an alternate member, and was its head in 1970.

He retired from the PCF leadership in February 1985 at age 65, believing himself to have reached a "militant age limit". He continued to be a member of the PCF and published several books on Marxist philosophy afterwards.

== Works ==
- Principes fondamentaux de philosophie, with Georges Politzer and Maurice Caveing, Éditions sociales, 1954
- Helvétius. De l'Esprit, introduction and notes by Guy Besse, Éditions sociales, 1959
- Pratique sociale et théorie, Éditions sociales, 1963
- La morale selon Kant et selon Marx, Centre d'études et de recherches marxistes, s.d.
- Lénine: la philosophie et la culture, with Jacques Milhau and Michel Simon, Éditions sociales, 1971
- Problèmes de la révolution socialiste en France: Semaine de la pensée marxiste (22-29 avril 1971), with Gérard de Bernis and François Billoux, Éditions sociales, 1971
- Jean-Jacques Rousseau, l'apprentissage de l'humanité, Éditions sociales, 1988
- La philosophie des Lumières, Éditions sociales, 1990

== Honours ==
- Chevalier de la Légion d'honneur
- Médaille de la Résistance
