= Hauts-de-Seine's 11th constituency =

Constituency of the National Assembly of France

11th constituency of Hauts-de-Seine
- inline Constituency of the National Assembly of France

- Deputy: Aurélien Saintoul; LFI
- Department: Hauts-de-Seine
- Cantons: Bagneux, Malakoff, Montrouge
- Registered voters: 67,356

The 11th constituency of the Hauts-de-Seine is a French legislative constituency in the Hauts-de-Seine département.

== Description ==
Hauts-de-Seine's 11th constituency sits the south of the department bordered to the north by Paris and to the east by Val-de-Marne.

The seat has nearly always been held by members of left-wing parties; it was held consistently by the French Communist Party, with the exception of the 1988 election, until 2012 when it was carried by the Socialists.

In the 2017 election, the seat was won by a centrist, Laurianne Rossi of La République en Marche !, for the first time. In 2022, it returned to the left, won by Aurélien Saintoul of La France Insoumise.

== Historic representatives ==
Election	Member	Party
1967	Guy Ducoloné	PCF
1968	Guy Ducoloné	PCF
1973	Guy Ducoloné	PCF
1978	Guy Ducoloné	PCF
1981	Guy Ducoloné	PCF
1986	Proportional representation – no election by constituency	
1988	Philippe Bassinet	PS
1993	Janine Jambu	PCF
1997	Janine Jambu	PCF
2002	Janine Jambu	PCF
2007	Marie-Hélène Amiable	PCF
2012	Julie Sommaruga	PS
2017	Laurianne Rossi	LREM
2022	Aurélien Saintoul	LFI

== Election results ==
=== 2024 ===
Candidate	Party	Alliance	First round			Second round		
Candidate	Party	Alliance	Votes	%	+/–	Votes	%	+/–
Aurélien Saintoul	LFI	NFP	25,031	50.14	+5.16			
Laurianne Rossi	RE	ENS	15,036	30.12	-5.99			
Juliette Chatelain	RN		6,737	13.49	+5.74			
Eric Roux	DIV		1,039	2.08	N/A			
Suzanne Baclet	REC		491	0.98	-3.88			
Franck Rollot	LO		281	0.56	-0.49			
Olivier Gardent	DIV		196	0.39	N/A			
Xavier Chiarelli	NPA		161	0.32	-0.33			
Philippe Ponge	DIV		154	0.31	-0.26			
Valid votes			49,923	98.12	+0.55			
Blank votes			647	1.27	-0.55			
Null votes			312	0.61	±0.00			
Turnout			50,882	71.01	+18.34			
Abstentions			20,777	28.99	-18.34			
Registered voters			71,659					
Source: Ministry of the Interior, Le Monde
Result						LFI HOLD		

=== 2022 ===
Legislative Election 2022: Hauts-de-Seine's 11th constituency
Party	Candidate	Votes	%	±%
LFI (NUPÉS)	Aurélien Saintoul	16,359	44.98	+4.94
LREM (Ensemble)	Laurianne Rossi	13,132	36.11	-2.32
RN	Juliette Chatelain	2,817	7.75	+2.08
REC	Florence Leveque	1,769	4.86	N/A
DVE	Dominique Chantal Broussaudier	880	2.42	N/A
Others	N/A	1,413		
Turnout		37,276	52.67	+0.48
2nd round result
LFI (NUPÉS)	Aurélien Saintoul	19,583	54.76	+7.09
LREM (Ensemble)	Laurianne Rossi	16,181	45.24	−7.09
Turnout		35,764	52.64	+7.71
LFI gain from LREM				

=== 2017 ===
Legislative Election 2017: Hauts-de-Seine's 11th constituency
Party	Candidate	Votes	%	±%
LREM	Laurianne Rossi	13,895	38.43	N/A
LFI	Yasmine Boudjenah	7,957	22.01	N/A
PS	Julie Sommaruga	5,237	14.48	−15.45
UDI	Philippe Parain	3,736	10.33	−13.82
FN	Julia Carrasco	2,051	5.67	−0.90
EELV	Carmelina De Pablo	1,284	3.55	+0.05
Others	N/A	1,995		
Turnout		36,155	52.19	−5.76
2nd round result
LREM	Laurianne Rossi	16,287	52.33	N/A
LFI	Yasmine Boudjenah	14,834	47.67	N/A
Turnout		31,121	44.93	−8.82
LREM gain from PS		Swing		

=== 2012 ===
Legislative Election 2012: Hauts-de-Seine's 11th constituency
Party	Candidate	Votes	%	±%
PS	Julie Sommaruga	11,681	29.93	+7.05
FG	Marie-Hélène Amiable*	11,399	29.20	+1.80
NM	Jean-Loup Metton	9,428	24.15	−12.17
FN	Marie De Fontenailles	2,564	6.57	+3.31
EELV	Rodéric Aarsse	1,368	3.50	−0.36
Others	N/A	2,593		
Turnout		39,033	57.95	−3.51
2nd round result
PS	Julie Sommaruga	23,242	64.22	N/A
NM	Jean-Loup Metton	12,950	35.78	−5.64
Turnout		36,192	53.73	−4.90
PS gain from PCF				

* Withdrew before the 2nd round

=== 2007 ===
Legislative Election 2007: Hauts-de-Seine's 11th constituency
Party	Candidate	Votes	%	±%
NM	Jean-Loup Metton	14,424	36.32	
PCF	Marie-Hélène Amiable	10,882	27.40	
PS	Catherine Picard	9,089	22.88	
LV	Carmelina De Pablo	1,534	3.86	
FN	Hubert Bonjean	1,294	3.26	
Far left	Olivier Barberousse	999	2.52	
Others	N/A	1,495		
Turnout		40,312	61.46	
2nd round result
PCF	Marie-Hélène Amiable	22,016	58.58	
NM	Jean-Loup Metton	15,570	41.42	
Turnout		38,461	58.63	
PCF hold				

=== 2002 ===
Legislative Election 2002: Hauts-de-Seine's 11th constituency
Party	Candidate	Votes	%	±%
PCF	Janine Jambu	10,005	26.33	
UDF	Jean-Loup Metton	8,914	23.46	
PS	Catherine Picard	7,512	19.77	
UMP	Silva Matricon	5,166	13.60	
FN	Jean-Pierre Schmitt	2,778	7.31	
LV	Carmelina De Pablo	1,111	2.92	
Others	N/A	2,512		
Turnout		38,452	64.57	
2nd round result
PCF	Janine Jambu	19,044	54.35	
UDF	Jean-Loup Metton	15,993	45.65	
Turnout		36,049	60.54	
PCF hold				

=== 1997 ===
Legislative Election 1997: Hauts-de-Seine's 11th constituency
Party	Candidate	Votes	%	±%
PCF	Janine Jambu	11,225	29.76	
UDF	Jean-Loup Metton	9,506	25.20	
PS	Philippe Bassinet	7,320	19.41	
FN	Raoul Raketitch	4,621	12.25	
DVE	Brigitte Bourges	1,214	3.22	
GE	Roger Ragot	972	2.58	
LO	Louis Pirois	965	2.56	
Others	N/A	1,896		
Turnout		38,819	63.24	
2nd round result
PCF	Janine Jambu	21,842	57.43	
UDF	Jean-Loup Metton	16,188	42.57	
Turnout		39,977	65.13	
PCF hold				

== Sources ==
- Official results of French elections from 1998: "Résultats électoraux officiels en France" (in French). Archived from the original on 20 December 2011.
