= Julie Sommaruga =

French politician (born 1975)

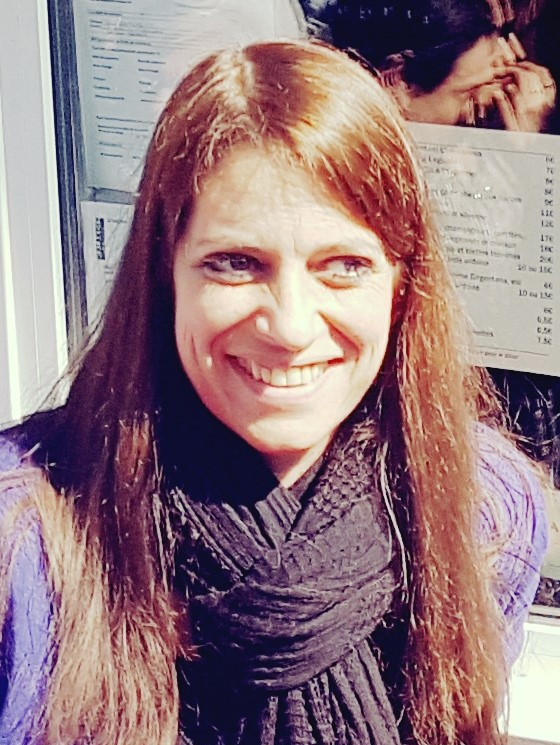
- Sommaruga in 2017

Member of the French National Assembly for Hauts-de-Seine's 11th constituency
- In office 20 June 2012 – 20 June 2017
- Preceded by: Marie-Hélène Amiable
- Succeeded by: Laurianne Rossi

Personal details
- Born: 1 August 1975 (age 50)
- Party: Socialist Party (since 1991)

Julie Sommaruga (born 1 August 1975) is a French politician. From 2012 to 2017, she was a member of the National Assembly. From 2008 to 2012, she served as deputy mayor for education of Bagneux.
