= Union of Communist Students =

Political organisation in France

Union of Communist Students Union des étudiants communistes
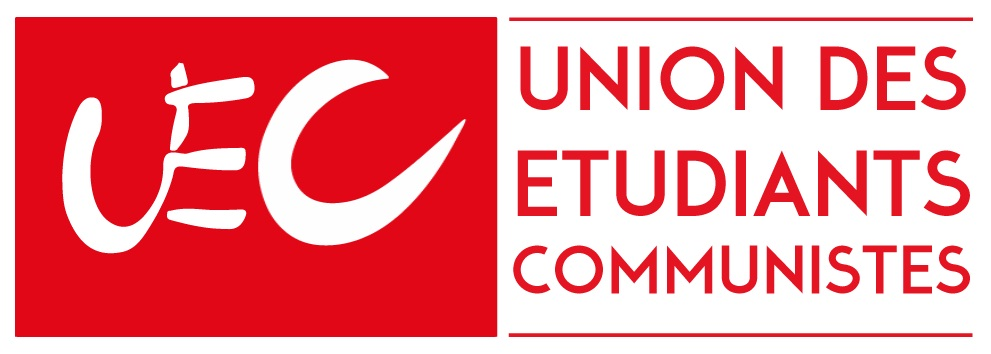
- Abbreviation: UEC
- Secretary: Camille Mongin
- Founded: April 1, 1939
- Preceded by: Federal Union of Students
- Headquarters: 2 Place du Colonel Fabien; 75019 Paris
- Newspaper: l'Avant-Garde
- Ideology: Communism; Feminism; Internationalism; Marxism
- National affiliation: Young Communists Movement of France

Website
- etudiants-communistes.fr

The Union of Communist Students (French: Union des étudiants communistes, UEC) is a French student political organization, part of the Mouvement Jeunes Communistes de France (MJCF, Young Communists Movement of France). It was founded in 1939 but dissolved after World War II. The UEC was re-created in 1956, along with the MJCF. It is independent from the French Communist Party (PCF) although it remains close to it. It maintains exchange contacts with the PCF, in particular on student issues. The UEC is organized in sectors, by university, and is led by a national collective elected during the congress of the MJCF and renewed during the National Assemblies of the facilitators, every year. A national coordination runs the organization.

== Roots ==
Although founded in 1939, the UEC is the heir of numerous students' associations, some of them created at the end of the 19th century at the beginning of the Third Republic. However, the Communist student movement was created following the 1920 Tours Congress of the French Section of the Workers' International (SFIO), in parallel with the creation of the Communist Youth and of the PCF (named at first SFIC - French Section of the Communist International).

During the July 12, 1920 Congress of the Etudiants socialistes révolutionnaires group (Revolutionary Socialist Students), mostly composed of anarchists (and not exclusively students), the Revolutionary Socialist Students decided to associate them with the Third International — four months before the creation of the Communist Youth and five months before the creation of the SFIC (future PCF). A lot of the Revolutionary Socialist Students were themselves former members of the mostly anarchist association Étudiants socialistes révolutionnaires internationalistes (Internationalist Revolutionary Socialist Students). After this decision, the Revolutionary Socialist Students took the name of Étudiants collectivistes révolutionnaires (Revolutionary Collectivist Students), among which were Nguyễn Sinh Cung, later known under the name of Hô Chi Minh.

After the creation of the Communist Youth (JC) and then of the Communist Youth International, the CYI absorbed the Internationale des Etudiants Socialistes and called forth to the communist students to join it. However, students' were not the priority of the JC — in 1920, France counted only 50,000 students, whom a vast majority came from the bourgeoisie. University circles were adamantly opposed to Communists, and mostly to the right — a lot of them were members of the monarchist Action française (AF). Until the 1930s, Communist presence in estudiantine sectors remained small, and the function of responsible of students quickly disappeared in the JC.

The majority of communist students gathered in the 1920s in the Union fédérale des étudiants (UFE, Federal Union of Students). Danielle and Laurent Casanova were both leaders in this union. The UFE, which boasted several thousand members, counted however many non-Communist members. Furthermore, it was confronted with problems regarding its political orientation, because of its mixed nature between a political association and a students' union. In 1935, after the February 6, 1934 riots organized by far-right leagues, the Etudiants socialistes (Socialist Students) merged with it. Despite this association, or the Clarté universitaire group of Georges Cogniot, related to Paul Vaillant-Couturier and Henri Barbusse's Clarté movement, there was no stable Communist youth organisation before 1938.

In December 1934, the Students' World Congress Against War and Fascism was organized in Brussels, after the World Youth Congress in Paris. Furthermore, the JC set up again, in 1935, a function of students' responsible, given to Aimé Albert. The office was renamed "Secretary for Students" at the JC Congress in Marseille of 1936. In 1937, during the Popular Front, the different communist students' groups organized themselves through the creation of a "national secretary of communist students of France," and published their first newspaper, Relève.

== Foundation and history ==
On April 1 and 2, 1939, the Union of Communist Students held its first, constitutive, national congress. It then boasted 1,000 members and groups in all of France, in particular in Paris, Toulouse, Grenoble and Strasbourg (where the local section was headed by Maurice Kriegel-Valrimont). Their main struggle was then anti-fascism, carried out in a difficult context because of the Munich Agreement. The UEC then gathered mainly university students, but also high school students. At the beginning of the war, the UEC became the UELC (Union des étudiants et lycéens communistes, Union of Communist Students and Lycéens - lycéens being high school students). The Congrès des lycéens anti-fascistes (Congress of Antifascist Lycéens) merged into it.

Dissolved after the Liberation, the UEC was re-created during the Fourth Republic, in 1956. Ten years later, "leftist" elements were excluded: those included Trotskyists who rejected Stalinism, such as Alain Krivine, future leader of the Trotskyist Revolutionary Communist League, and Maoists. The first created the Jeunesse communiste révolutionnaire (JCR, Revolutionary Communist Youth) and the second the Union des jeunesses communistes marxistes-léninistes (UJC (ml); Union of Marxist–Leninist Communist Youth).

== Organisation ==
Today, the UEC is organized in local sections, mostly corresponding to universities or campus. These sections are sometimes regrouped in citywide sections or groups of cities. It is headed by a national collective of 30 members, elected during each congress of the MJCF. The national collective then elects a national coordination, charged of the implementation of the collective's decision and of the organisation of debates, as well as a national secretary.

The UEC is present in many universities, including the Sorbonne, Jussieu University, Tolbiac University, University of Paris III (Censier), Université de Versailles Saint-Quentin-en-Yvelines, University of Paris VIII, University of Aix-Marseille, University of Bordeaux, University of Caen, University of Grenoble, University of Lyon, University of Orléans, University of Dijon, etc.

== Activity ==
Along with ATTAC Campus, the UEC is the only student political association present at the national scale (notwithstanding students' union such as the UNEF). Since it is not a students' union, it does not present itself at students' elections in universities. However, the UEC did present an electoral list in December 2005 for the elections in the University of Aix-Marseille I, which obtained 15% of the votes; the vice-president of the students' representatives in the universities is therefore affiliated to the UEC.

The UEC contributes to political debate, carries out investigations and information tasks. It took part to the 2006 protests against the CPE labour contract. It has opposed itself to the Bologna process reforming universities at the European scale, implemented in France by the LMD reforms, and participated to the demonstrations in 2003 against these reforms. In June 2006, the UEC participated to the collective Unis contre l'immigration jetable (United Against Throw-Away Immigration) and to the creation of the Réseau université sans frontière (Network of Universities Without Borders), opposed to anti-immigration policies then enacted by Dominique de Villepin's government (with Nicolas Sarkozy as Minister of Interior).

== List of national secretaries ==
List of the UEC national secretaries :
1939	Pierre Hervé
1939-1941	Francis Cohen, François Lescure, Suzanne Djian (collective clandestine direction)
1944-1945	Guy Besse
1956-1957	Serge Magnien
1957-1958	Claude Deydié
1958-1959	Claude Kastler
1959-1961	Philippe Robrieux
1961-1962	Jean Piel
1962-1964	Alain Forner
1964-1965	Pierre Kahn
1965-1967	Guy Hermier
1967-1969	Jean-Michel Catala
1969-1971	Gérard Molina
1971-1973	Pierre Zarka
1973-1976	Jean-Charles Eleb
1976-1979	Francis Combes
1979-1984	Patrice Dauvin
1984-1986	Pierre Laurent
1986-1987	Sabino Patruno
1987-1991	Sylvie Vassallo
1991-1994	Alain Raimbault
1994-1997	Yasmine Boudjenah
1997-1998	Nadège Magnon
1998-2000	Pierre Garzon
2000-2002	Olivier Valentin
2002-2004	Vincent Bordas
2004-2006	Manuel Blasco
2006-2009	Igor Zamichiei
2009-2010	François Dellaleau
2010-2013	Marion Guenot
2013-2015	Hugo Pompougnac
2015-2016	Matthieu Bauhain
2016-2019	Antoine Guerreiro
2019-2020	Anais Fley
2020-2022	Jeanne Pechon
2022-2025	Léna Raud
2025-	Camille Mongin

== Some former members ==
- Tony Bloncourt (Resistant during Vichy France, executed in 1942)
- Pierre Goldman (assassinated in 1979)
- Maurice Kriegel-Valrimont (Resistant during Vichy France, died in 2006)
- Alain Krivine (now leader of the Revolutionary Communist League, LCR)
- Dominique Strauss-Kahn (president of the International Monetary Fund as of 2007)

== Bibliography ==
- BRILLANT, Bernard, Les clercs de 68. Paris : PUF, 2003.
- DREYFUS, Michel, PCF, crises et dissidences. Paris : éditions Complexe, 1990.
- HAMON Hervé, ROTMAN Patrick, Génération. 1. Les années de rêve. Paris : Le Seuil, 1987. ISBN 2-02-009549-1
- MATONTI, Frédérique, Intellectuels communistes, essai sur l'obéissance politique : la Nouvelle Critique (1967-1980). Paris : la Découverte, 2005.
- Mouvement de la jeunesse communiste de France, Jeunesse, socialisme, liberté : congrès extraordinaire du mouvement de la jeunesse communiste de France, Paris : MJCF, 1977. 200 pages.
- ROBRIEUX, Philippe, Notre génération communiste (1953-1968). Paris : Robert Laffont, 1977.
- ROBRIEUX, Philippe, Histoire intérieure du Parti communiste français, quatre tomes. Paris : Fayard, 1980-1984.
- RUSCIO, Alain, Nous et moi, grandeurs et servitudes communistes. Paris : éditions Tirésias, 2003.
- VARIN, Jacques, Jeunes comme JC : sur la jeunesse communiste (1920 - 1939). Paris : éditions sociales, 1975. 271 pages. ISBN 978-2-209-05160-1
