= Valentin Feldman =

French philosopher and Marxist of Jewish-Russian origin

Valentin Feldman (23 June 1909 – 27 July 1942) was a French philosopher and Marxist of Jewish-Russian origin. In 1942, he was murdered by the Nazis during the Occupation of France.

Born in Saint Petersburg, he left the USSR in 1922 at the end of the Civil War. He settled in Paris and studied at the Lycée Henri IV and the Sorbonne University. A pupil of French philosopher Victor Basch, he worked on aesthetics and wrote an essay, L'Esthétique française contemporaine (French contemporan aesthetic), Félix Alcan, 1936.

Involved in public activities as a teacher of philosophy, he supported as an antifascist the Front populaire and the Spanish Republic during the Spanish Civil War. He joined the French Communist Party in 1937. Among his friends were Jean-Paul Sartre, Simone de Beauvoir, Gaston Bachelard and Georges Politzer. In September 1939, he volunteered for the French Army despite suffering from a heart condition. Mobilized as a soldier in Rethel, he began to write his Journal de guerre in January 1940 in the middle of the Phoney War. He survived several air attacks and bombardments during the Fall of France (May–June 1940).

Under the German Occupation he was a teacher in Dieppe but suffered from the first law on the status of Jews (October 1940). He was finally excluded from teaching in July 1941. By that time, he was already active in the French Resistance. From 1940, he was liaison officer between Dieppe, Rouen and Paris. After a year, he wrote the texts against the collaborationist Vichy regime and the Germans in the clandestine newspaper L'Avenir normand in Dieppe, and wrote several texts for the clandestine Parisian review La Pensée libre, supervised by Georges Politzer, Jacques Decour and Jacques Solomon. Becoming part of the underground, he joined a group of communist Resistance in Rouen, where he participated in actions against the German occupiers.

Arrested in February 1942 after the sabotage of a factory, he was imprisoned and tortured. Judged in Paris, he was condemned to death by a German military tribunal. He refused to sign his appeal for a reprieve. Feldman was executed by a firing squad on 27 July 1942. Addressing the German soldiers just before the salvo, he called out to them: "Imbeciles, it is for you that I die!"

His last words inspired numerous French writers: Jean-Paul Sartre and Louis Aragon were among them. French-Swiss film-maker Jean-Luc Godard dedicated a short film to him, The Last Word (1988).

== Works ==
Essays :

- L'Esthétique française contemporaine, Paris, Félix Alcan, 1936. (fr.)
- Journal de guerre. 1940-1941, Tours, Farrago, 2006. (fr.)

Translations (from Russian to French) :

- I.K. Luppol, Diderot. Ses idées philosophiques, Paris, Éditions sociales internationales, 1936. (fr.)
- Nicolas Ostrovski, Et l’acier fut trempé..., préface de Romain Rolland, Paris, Éditions sociales internationales, 1937. (fr.)
