= Libertaire Rutigliano =

French resistance fighter and Holocaust victim (1921–1945)

- Born: 19 December 1921; Cairo, Egypt
- Died: 6 May 1945 (aged 23); Dachau concentration camp, Germany
- Education: École Centrale Paris
- Political party: French Communist Party
- Movement: French Resistance

Libertaire Rutigliano (19 December 1921 – 6 May 1945) was a French resistance fighter and member of the French Communist Party. Born in Cairo, Egypt, he was deported to the Dachau concentration camp, where he died of tuberculosis shortly after the camp's liberation in 1945.

== Biography ==
Libertaire Rutigliano was born in Cairo, Egypt, on 19 December 1921, the son of Nicolas Rutigliano, an Italian born in Cairo in 1888 to immigrant parents. After World War I, Nicolas joined the communist movement. In 1926, the family was expelled from Egypt and relocated to Naples, Italy. They later moved to France, settling in Paris, where Nicolas worked in Nice and then at the shipyards in Saint-Nazaire. The family established residence in Nantes in 1935.

Rutigliano completed his secondary education in Nice, Saint-Nazaire, and at Lycée Clemenceau in Nantes, where he studied in a preparatory class. In May 1942, he gained admission to the École Centrale Paris.

During World War II, Rutigliano joined the Front National, a mass organization affiliated with the French Communist Party. He became a leader of the Front's student section in Paris. In 1943, he abandoned his studies and returned to Nantes, where he founded the city's first university resistance group. He raised funds to support the publication of resistance newspapers, including Front, established in 1942. In 1943, he represented the Front National in the newly formed Departmental Liberation Committee of Loire-Inférieure. By early 1944, he served as the interdepartmental leader of the United Patriotic Youth Forces in western France, temporarily residing in Parthenay, Deux-Sèvres.

On 1 April 1944, Rutigliano was arrested at his father's home in Nantes by seven Gestapo agents, though some sources indicate the arrest was carried out by the SRMAN (Service de répression des menées anti-nationales, formerly the Anti-Communist Police Service). Both he and his father were taken to Gestapo headquarters at Place Maréchal-Foch in Nantes, where they were interrogated and tortured. They were then imprisoned at Rue Descartes in Nantes before being transferred to Compiègne and deported to Dachau concentration camp in Germany as part of convoy 1229, alongside other Nantes resistance fighters, including Jean-Baptiste Daviais and Gilbert Burlot. At Dachau, Rutigliano was assigned prisoner number 72926 and later transferred to the Allach subcamp, where he organized bread collections among prisoners. He died of tuberculosis on 6 May 1945, six days after the camp's liberation, at the age of 23.

In 1948, Nicolas Rutigliano, who had seen his son shortly before his death, sculpted a bust of Libertaire and placed it on his wife's grave in the Gaudinière Cemetery in Nantes. Due to weather damage, the city of Nantes and the National Association of Resistance Veterans commissioned a new bust in 1999.

== Legacy ==
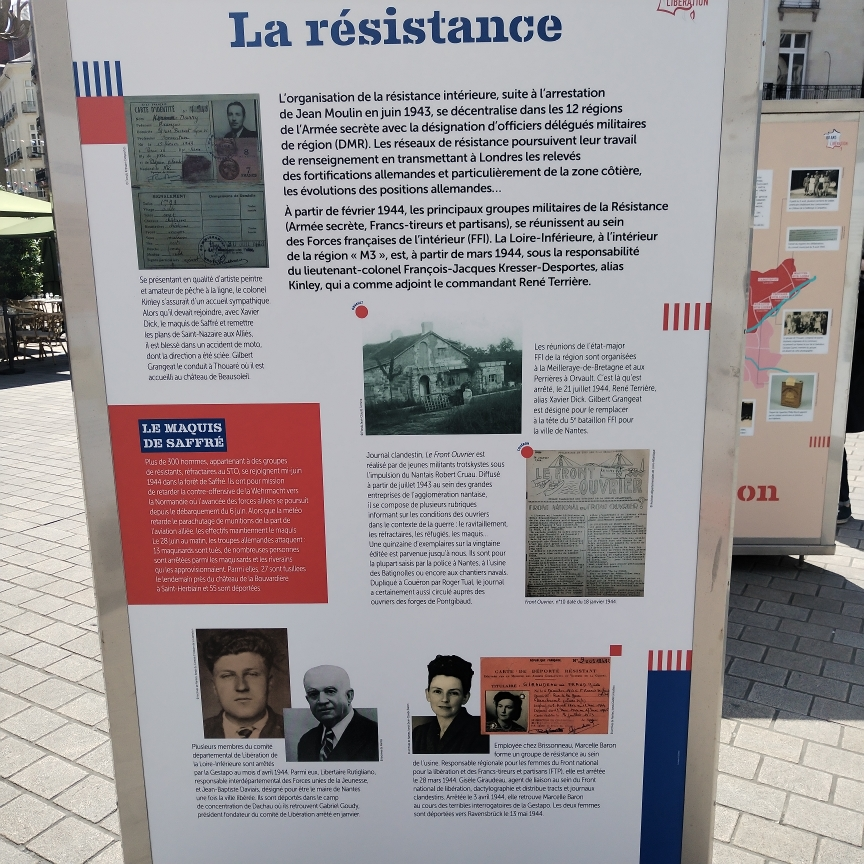

In June 1945, the Rutigliano Committee was established in Nantes, affiliated with the Front National, led by Jean Philippot, then mayor of Nantes and a professor at Lycée Clemenceau. In 1946, the committee, chaired by Paul Le Rolland, published a memorial brochure titled Sacrifice, which was reissued in 1989.

In 1948, Nicolas Rutigliano created a bust depicting Libertaire in a deportee's uniform with a shaved head, based on his final memory of his son. In 1999, Nantes sculptor Jean Guitteny crafted a new bust, portraying a healthy young man based on pre-arrest photographs. This 300 kg statue, carved from white Lavoux stone, is displayed at the Gaudinière Cemetery.

In 1980, the Port-Boyer college in Nantes, located at 60 Rue de l'Éraudière, was named Collège Libertaire-Rutigliano. A bust of Rutigliano was installed at the college in 1984.

In May 2025, the city of Nantes honored Rutigliano with an exhibition at Place Graslin, commemorating the end of the occupation and liberation.

== Bibliography ==
- Croix, Alain (2007). Nantais venus d'ailleurs: Histoire des étrangers à Nantes des origines à nos jours [Nantes residents from elsewhere: History of foreigners in Nantes from its origins to the present day] (in French). Nantes-Histoire/Presses universitaires de Rennes. ISBN 978-2-7535-0339-7.
- Guiffan, Jean; Barreau, Joël; Liters, Jean-Louis (2008). Le Lycée Clemenceau: 200 ans d'histoire [Lycée Clemenceau: 200 years of history] (in French). Nantes: Éditions Coiffard. ISBN 978-2-910366-85-8.
- Prouteau, Marie-Hélène (2017). "La tristesse du magnolia". La ville aux maisons qui penchent, Suites nantaises [The city with leaning houses, Nantes suites] (in French). La Chambre d'échos. ISBN 978-2-35639-204-6.
