= Rosette C. Lamont =

American theater critic (1927–2012)

- Born: February 15, 1927; Paris, France
- Died: January 5, 2012 (aged 84); Falmouth, Massachusetts, U.S.
- Occupation: Theater critic
- Spouse: Bernard Seidler (divorced) Fredrick H. Farmer (divorced)
- Awards: Guggenheim Fellowship (1973)

Academic background
- Education: Hunter College; Yale University

Academic work
- Sub-discipline: Contemporary French theater; Eugene Ionesco
- Institutions: Queens College; CUNY Graduate Center; Sarah Lawrence College

Rosette Clementine Lamont (February 15, 1927 – January 5, 2012) was an American theater critic. She was author of The Two Faces of Ionesco (1978) and Ionesco’s Imperatives (1993), as well as English-language translator of Charlotte Delbo's memoirs Auschwitz and After. She was also a full professor at Queens College and CUNY Graduate Center before moving to Sarah Lawrence College.

== Biography ==
Rosette Lamont was born on February 15, 1927, in Paris. She was the only child of concert pianist Ludmila Lieberman Salomon and furrier Alexandre Salomon, both of whom were Russian emigrants to France. After immigrating to the United States as World War II refugees, she was raised in the Upper West Side in Manhattan. She attended Hunter College, where she obtained a BA in 1947, and Yale University, where she obtained an MA in 1948 and a PhD in 1954.

In 1950, Lamont began working at Queens College as a tutor. She was later promoted to instructor in 1954, assistant professor in 1959–65, associate professor in 1965, and full professor in 1967. She also became a full professor at CUNY Graduate Center in 1968. She moved to Sarah Lawrence College in 1994, supporting their experimental theater work and calling the institution her "utopia on a hill".

Marvin Carlson called Lamont "a leading scholar on the post-war French theatre". She was widely known as an authority on Eugene Ionesco. She wrote two books on the subject: The Two Faces of Ionesco (1978) and Ionesco’s Imperatives (1993). A theater critic, she contributed to publications like The New York Times, TheaterWeek, and The New York Theatre Wire. She was also part of the first editorial board for the journal Western European Stages, where she wrote essays on contemporary Parisian theatre. She published an English translation of Auschwitz and After, after meeting its writer Charlotte Delbo.

In 1973, Lamont was awarded a Guggenheim Fellowship "for a study of the anti-hero in the drama and the novel". She also served as a 1974 Department of State Scholar Exchange Program envoy and a 1983-1984 Rockefeller Foundation Humanities Fellow. She also received the Officier of the Ordre des Arts et des Lettres and the Officier of the Ordre des Palmes Académiques.

Lamont was twice-divorced, from Bernard Seidler and Fredrick H. Farmer. She was a long-time friend of playwright Eugène Ionesco, whom she met when his play Rhinoceros made its Broadway debut. She also was in a relationship with Saul Bellow, whose 1964 novel Herzog had one of its major characters, Ramona, inspired by her. Her mother was murdered at some point after Lamont's first marriage.

Lamont died on January 5, 2012, in Falmouth, Massachusetts.
