= Laurianne Rossi =

French politician (born 1984)

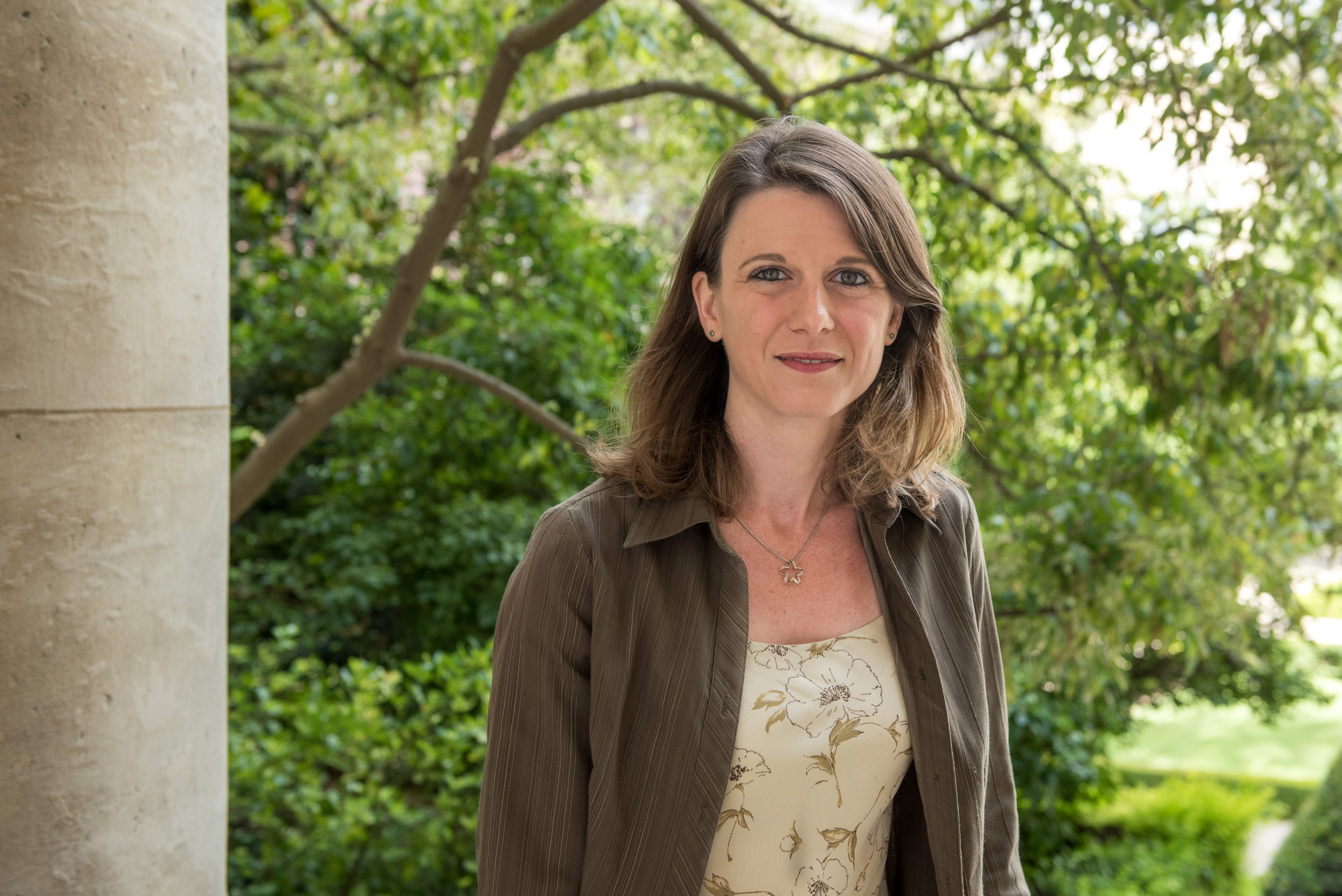
- Laurianne Rossi in 2017

Member of the National Assembly for Hauts-de-Seine's 11th constituency
- In office 21 June 2017 – 21 June 2022
- Preceded by: Julie Sommaruga
- Succeeded by: Aurélien Saintoul

Personal details
- Born: 18 May 1984 (age 42) Toulon, France
- Party: Renaissance
- Education: Sciences Po Aix; University of Paris 1 Panthéon-Sorbonne

Laurianne Rossi (born 18 May 1984) is a French politician of La République En Marche! (LREM) who was elected to the French National Assembly on 18 June 2017, representing the department of Hauts-de-Seine.

== Early life and education ==
Rossi is a graduate of the Sciences Po Aix (2006) and of the Master 2 "Public Affairs" of the Pantheon-Sorbonne University (2007). During her studies, she completed internships with the Global Fund to Fight AIDS, Tuberculosis and Malaria (GFATM) and the United Nations Development Programme (UNDP).

== Political career ==
From 2007 to 2011, Rossi was a member of the Socialist Party. During that time, she was considered a supporter of Dominique Strauss-Kahn and Pierre Moscovici. She left the party in 2011.

Since joining the National Assembly, Rossi has been serving as quaestor and therefore part of the Assembly's Bureau in the 15th legislature of the French Fifth Republic, under the leadership of president Richard Ferrand. She also serves on the Committee on Sustainable Development and Spatial Planning. In addition to her committee assignments, she is part of the French-Egyptian Parliamentary Friendship Group.

In September 2018, after François de Rugy's appointment to the government, Rossi supported Barbara Pompili's candidacy for the presidency of the National Assembly.

In the 2022 French legislative election she was unseated by Aurélien Saintoul from La France Insoumise.

== Other activities ==
- Observatoire de l'éthique publique (OEP), Vice-President

== See also ==
- 2017 French legislative election
