= Jacques Decour =

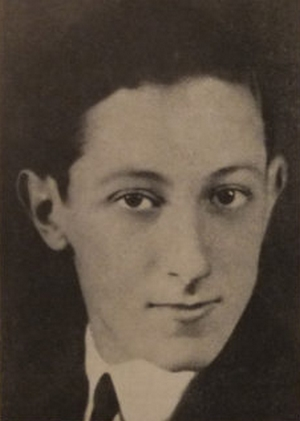
- Jacques Decour c. 1928
- Born: Daniel Decourdemanche; 21 February 1910; Paris, France
- Died: 30 June 1942 (aged 32); Fort Mont-Valérien, Paris, France
- Occupations: Germanist, writer

Jacques Decour (French pronunciation: [ʒak dəkuʁ]; born Daniel Decourdemanche; 21 February 1910 – 30 May 1942), was a French writer, Germanist, essayist, translator and resistant fighter, executed by the Nazis.

== Biography ==
Jacques Decour studied at the Lycée Carnot in Paris and the Lycée Pasteur in Neuilly-sur-Seine. He began his studies in law, but, after a few years changed his orientation and studied German literature and was the youngest student to pass the competitive examination of agrégation in German in 1932.

In 1931, he was named assistant of French at the Domgymnasium in Magdeburg in Prussia . There, he wrote his first book, Philisterburg, which described the risks of nationalism and the "inadmissible myth of race".

Daniel Decourdemanche was then appointed as a teacher of German in Reims where he joined the French Young Communist movement. He was then moved to Tours where he joined the Communist Party.

In 1937, he was appointed as professor of German in Paris at the lycée Rollin (the school which, after Liberation, would become the lycée Jacques-Decour in his honour). He joined the resistance and founded the magazines L'Université libre in 1940 and La Pensée libre in 1941 which became important publications in occupied France.

In 1941, Decour became responsible for the Comité national des écrivains which published a new magazine the Lettres françaises but never got to see it, due to his arrest by the French police on 17 February 1942. Imprisoned in La Santé by the Germans, he was executed on 30 May 1942, one week after Georges Politzer and Jacques Solomon. In the cell where he was waiting for his execution in Fort Mont-Valérien, he wrote a letter saying goodbye to those he loved: his parents and his daughter Brigitte. Resigned to his forthcoming death, he expressed his confidence in youth, and hoped that his sacrifice would not be in vain.

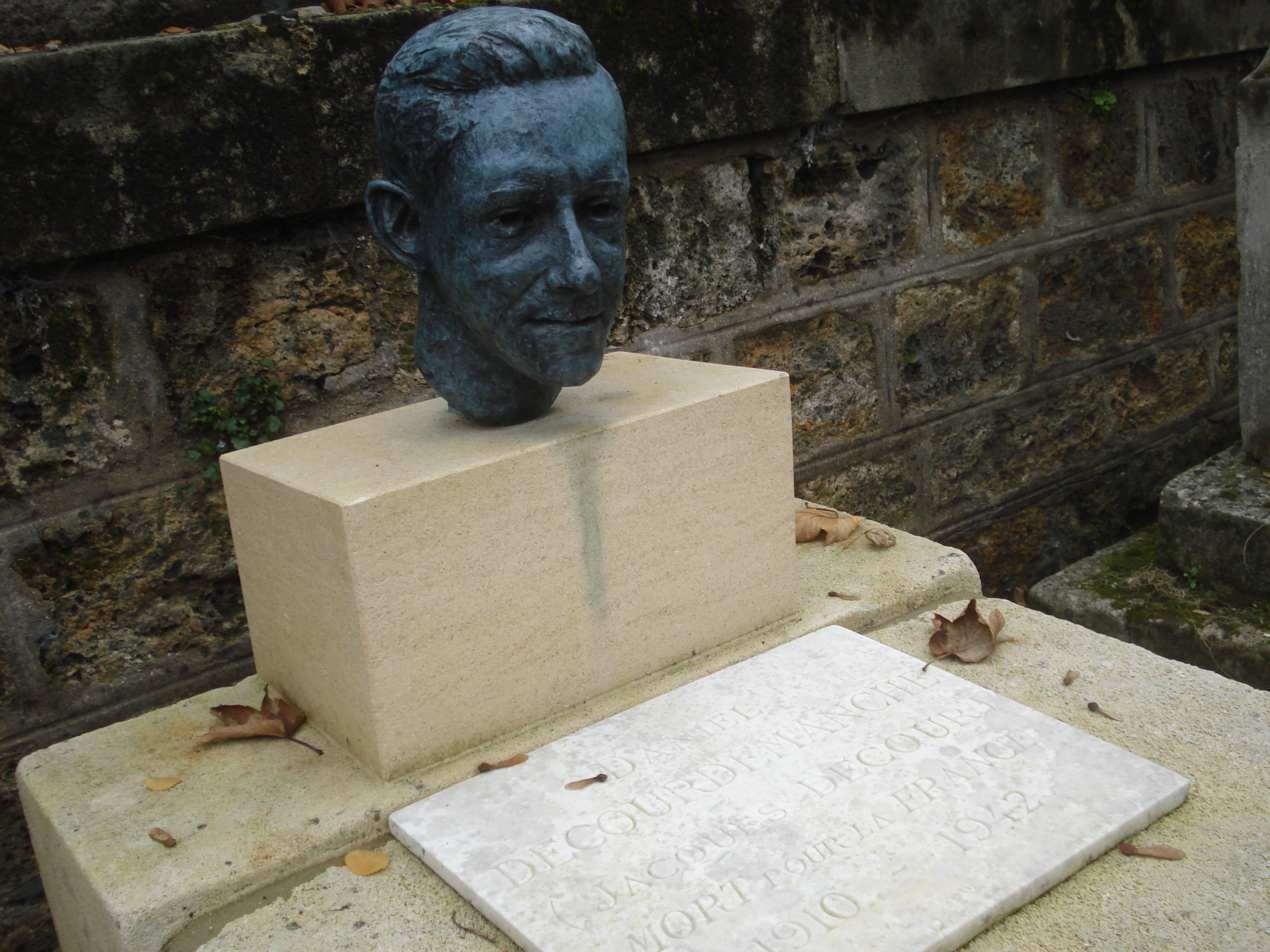
Jacques Decour's tomb at Montmartre Cemetery in Paris

"Je me considère un peu comme une feuille qui tombe de l’arbre pour faire du terreau. La qualité du terreau dépendra de celle des feuilles. Je veux parler de la jeunesse française, en qui je mets tout mon espoir." "I think of myself as a leaf that falls from the tree to make soil. The quality of the soil will depend on that of the leaves. I mean French youth, in whom I put all my hope."

== Publications ==
- Philisterburg (NRF, 1932).
- Le Sage et le Caporal (Gallimard Collection blanche, 1930).
- La Révolte, NRF, March 1934, republished in Comme je vous en donne l'exemple... and in Le Sage et le Capora, followed by Les Pères and seven other unpublished short stories (Farrago, 2002).
- Les Pères, NRF, 1936, Farrago, Tours, 2002 (Le Sage et le Caporal followed by Les Pères and seven other unpublished short stories).
- Comme je vous en donne l'exemple... (Éditions Sociales, 1945, texts by Jacques Decour published by Aragon).
- La Faune de la collaboration, Articles 1932-1942 (2012) (in French)

== Translations ==
- Le Triomphe de la sensibilité, Goethe (1942)
- Les Mystères de la maturité, Hans Carossa (1941)
- L'Art gothique, Wilhelm Worringer (1941)
- La Carrière de Doris Hart, Vicki Baum, 1948.
- Les dessous de la diplomatie, Hans Rudolf Berndorff, 1932.
- Suivi de L’élaboration de la pensée par le discours, Heinrich von Kleist.
- Le Roman d’un coup d’État, Alfred Neumann, 1935.
- Les désordres sexuels, Richard Schauer, 1934.
- La Sexualité dans l’univers, Curt Thesing, 1933.
- Le fils d’Hannibal, Ludwig Ernst Wolff, 1938.

== See also ==
Articles published in various magazines: NRF, February 1930-December 1936, Les Annales, March 1932-August 1933, La Voix du peuple de Touraine, December 1936–June 1937, Commune, December 1938–June 1939, L'Université libre, November 1940–December 1941, La Pensée libre, February 1941–February 1942.
