= National Front (French Resistance) =

World War II French Resistance movement

National Front Front national
- Founder: PCF
- Leader: Frédéric Joliot-Curie
- Secretary General: Pierre Villon
- Founded: May 15, 1942
- Dates active: May 1942 – 1949
- Dissolved: 1949
- Newspaper: See Publications
- Ideology: French nationalism Left-wing nationalism Marxism-Leninism
- Political position: Left-wing
- Part of: CNR
- Wars: the Second World War

The National Front for an Independent France, better known simply as National Front (French: Front national or Front national de l'indépendance de la France) was a World War II French Resistance movement created to unite all of the resistance organizations together to fight the Nazi occupation forces and Vichy France under Marshall Pétain.

Founded in 1941 in Paris by French Communist Party (PCF) members Jacques Duclos, André Pican, Pierre Villon, and their wives, they felt that all of the Resistance movements had to band together no matter their party or religion (Jewish or Catholic) to be a vital force against the Nazis, the collaborationists, and the informers. Its name was inspired by the Popular Front, a left-wing coalition that governed France from 1936 to 1938. This helped them coordinate attacks all across France; to move weapons, false identity papers, information and food; protect and move people who were to be arrested or executed; and supply multiple safe houses for the Resistance and for Jews. In 1942, they formed fighting units to assassinate German leaders and soldiers among the occupation forces; perform acts of sabotage on railroads and other transportation infrastructure being used to transport people and goods being taken from France to Germany; and to help organize sabotage in factories forced to produce armaments and goods for the German military.

== Political front of the FTP ==
The National Front (FN) was destined to be the "political representative" of the armed force called the Francs-Tireurs et Partisans (FTP). It engaged mainly in propaganda, editing reviews, fabricating false identity documents, supporting clandestine organizations logistically, and sabotaging German and Vichy facilities and capabilities. It was a member of the Conseil national de la Résistance (CNR), which federated, under Jean Moulin's authority, various Resistance movements, beginning in the middle of 1943.

Led by Pierre Villon, it then extended itself to Catholics and other religious resistants. Pierre Villon stated: "The FN is the only movement where we have finally reconciled the parish priest (curé) and the teacher, the Parti Social Français and the Communist, and the Radical with the Socialist." Various specialized professional organizations were created under the authority of the Front National (the workers' Front National, the peasants' Front National, the lawyers' Front National, the doctors' Front National, the women's Front National, etc.). After the invasion of the Soviet Union on 22 June 1941, L'Humanité, in its issues of July 2 and July 7, wrote: "Unite yourself, refuse to serve under fascism!" At that time, the FTP armed wing had already been active since 1941, but the Resistance quickly expanded itself during 1942 and 1943. The French population's morale improved as the difficulties faced by the Wehrmacht increased, in particular during the protracted Battle of Stalingrad. The 4 September 1942 Law on the STO (Service du travail obligatoire), signed by Pierre Laval, the head of government in the Vichy régime, proposed to exchange one prisoner-of-war for three Frenchmen to go to work in Nazi Germany. This was an important cause of the Resistance's dramatic increase in numbers, inspiring many young male adults to stand up and volunteer for the Maquis.

At the time of the liberation of Paris, after the deportation and death of many of the members of the original clandestine leadership, the FN resistance movement counted such figures as Frédéric Joliot-Curie, Pierre Villon, Henri Wallon, Laurent Casanova, François Mauriac, and Louis Aragon among its members.

== Legal ownership of the name, "Front National" ==
A juridical battle between the far-right Front National and Bruno Mégret's splinter party, the National Republican Movement (MNR), for the name, "Front national," in December 1998 and January 1999, prompted the satirical newspaper, Charlie Hebdo, to outrace both by deposing at the National Industrial Property Institute (INPI), the national institute in charge of trademarks, the term "Front National," in order to give its juridical ownership back to the original Resistance movement of that name. Thus, the World War II resisters, the Front National, is once again the only movement legally entitled to be named "Front National.".

== Publications ==
The National Front published numerous national and local clandestine newspapers and flyers. From the spring of 1943 to the Liberation, 79 publications were published. In 1944–1945 they published, according to an internal French Communist Party (PCF) source, "Seventeen dailies, one million sales. three weeklies: La Marseillaise (Île-de-France), France d'abord, Action. Five literary weeklies, 35 periodicals (weeklies) in the provinces.".

Among them, were:

- Les Lettres Françaises

Review of French writers assembled in the Comité national des écrivains. Founded in October 1941 by Jacques Decour and Jean Paulhan, 25 issues were published. Les Lettres Françaises appeared after Liberation, until 1972.

- L’École laïque (1941);
- La Terre (newspaper), rural life. Created in 1937, it went underground during the occupation.
- Le Médecin français (March 1941) headed by Doctor Raymond Leibovici;
- Musiciens d’Aujourd’hui (1942), a clandestine paper printed in 2500 copies, for which André Fougeron created the model, which became Le Musicien d’Aujourd’hui when it merged with the Lettres françaises;
- L’Université libre (104 issues, from November 1940 o October 1944), headed by Georges Politzer, Jacques Solomon (son-in-law of Paul Langevin) and Jacques Decour;
- L'Écran français (1943);
- Le Palais libre (1943), of the Front national des juristes;
- L’Étudiant patriote (1941);
- Le Lycéen patriote, organ of the National Front of lycée, college, and technical school students. (1944);
- Les Allobroges (1942), région Isère-Hautes Alpes; became a daly at Liberation;
- Front National, Parisian newspaper, a daily starting in August 1944, directed by Jacques Debû-Bridel;
- La Marseillaise (newspaper), in Marseille; a daily at Liberation;
- La Marseillaise de Seine-et-Oise;
- Le Patriote d'Ajaccio, organ of the National Front in Corsica;
- Le Patriote, National Front newspaper in Lyon;
- Le Patriote de Saint-Étienne, organ of the National Front of the Loire;
- Le Patriote du Sud-Ouest, organ of the National Front in Toulouse; a daily at Liberation, its director was then André Wurmser and was among its young coworkers Pierre Gamarra;
- Le Patriote niçois; a daily at Liberation;
- L'Écho du Centre, in Limoges; a daily at Liberation.

They also published books and brochures, such as a book about the Oradour-sur-Glane massacre.

== See also ==
- French Resistance
