= Yasmine Boudjenah =

French politician (born 1970)

Member of the European Parliament
- In office 20 July 1999 – 19 July 2004
- Constituency: France

Personal details
- Born: 21 December 1970 (age 55) Paris, France
- Party: French Communist Party
- Occupation: Politician

Yasmine Boudjenah (born 21 December 1970), is a French politician, who, from 1999 until 2004, was a Member of the European Parliament representing France. She was elected representing the Communist Party.

== Biography ==
Yasmine Boudjenah grew up in Bagneux, Hauts-de-Seine, raised by an Algerian father who worked for Renault and a mother who was a teacher from Loir-et-Cher. She obtained her high school diploma at Lakanal High School and went on to study economics at the Jussieu Campus.

In 1986, she discovered politics by leading actions with the Mouvement Jeunes Communistes de France for the release of Nelson Mandela and participating in demonstrations against apartheid in South Africa.

Having become a young communist activist, Yasmine Boudjenah was part of the “Mandela Generation” that fought in anti-racist movements, propelling her into political life. She was elected national secretary of the Union of Communist Students (UEC) from 1994 to 1997 and campaigned for students' rights, against the precariousness imposed on young people, but also in solidarity with the Algerian people against fundamentalist barbarism. It was in this context that she led the Appel du Petit Prince (Call of the Little Prince), bringing together young people and artists to charter a book boat for children.

She holds a doctorate in Social science (2001).

== Parliamentary service ==
- Member, Committee on Development and Cooperation
- Member, Delegation for relations with the Maghreb countries and the Arab Maghreb Union
