= Tony Bloncourt =

Haitian communist (1921–1942)

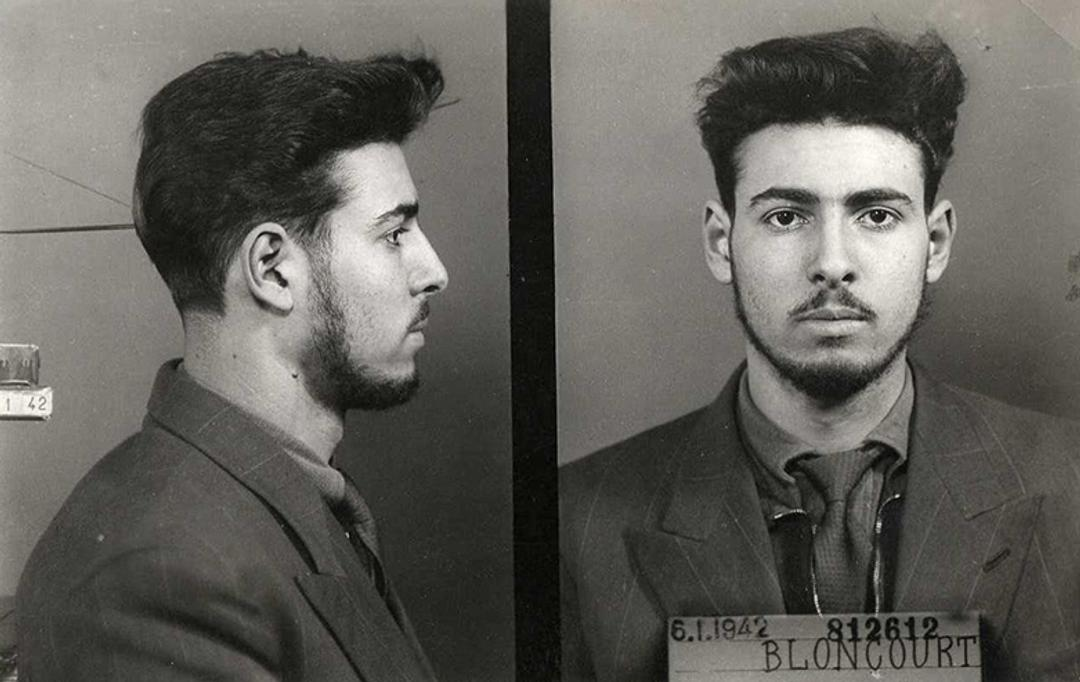
Police mugshot, 6 January 1942

Tony Bloncourt (1921–March 9, 1942) was a Haitian communist who joined the French Resistance against Nazi occupation in World War II. A member of the Union of Communist Students (French: Union des étudiants communistes, UEC), he was executed as part of the Procès du Palais Bourbon along with six other members of the Bataillons de la Jeunesse for his participation.

== Biography ==
Born into a family of Guadeloupean descent, Tony Bloncourt is the son of teachers who moved to Haiti.He is the great-nephew of MP and Communard Melvil-Bloncourt, the nephew of Élie Bloncourt, future Socialist MP for Aisne and founder of the Parti Socialiste Unitaire, and of Max, known as Max Clainville-Bloncourt, lawyer and anti-colonialist activist, close to Ho Chi Minh.

As a student at the Paris Faculty of Science in the late 1930s, he joined the Union of Communist Students.

He was one of the militants who took part in the first act of Communist resistance in France, the parade in Paris on November 11, 1940.

He then took part in numerous acts of resistance, mainly under the leadership of Gilbert Brustlein, as part of the Youth Battalions. At the time of his arrest by the Germans in January 1942, 17 operations could be attributed to him.

He was one of the defendants at the Palais Bourbon trial, which resulted in the death sentence of the seven accused Resistance fighters. He was shot on March 9 at Fort Mont-Valérien.

== Bibliography ==
- Albert Ouzoulias, Les Bataillons de la Jeunesse, éditions Sociales, 1972 ISBN 2-209-05372-2
- Éric Alary, Mars 1942. Un procès au Palais-Bourbon, éditions de l'Assemblée nationale, 2000 (préface de Jean-Pierre Azéma)
