= Auschwitz and After =

- U.S. English-language edition
- Author: Charlotte Delbo
- Original title: Auschwitz, et après
- Translator: Rosette C. Lamont
- Language: French
- Subject: Holocaust
- Publisher: Yale University Press
- Publication place: France
- English publication date: 1985
- Media type: Paperback
- Pages: 355
- ISBN: 0-300-07057-8
- OCLC: 31290828

Auschwitz and After (Auschwitz, et après) is a first person account of life and survival in Birkenau by Charlotte Delbo, translated into English by Rosette C. Lamont.

Delbo, who had returned to occupied France to work in the French resistance alongside her husband, was sent to Auschwitz for her activities. Her memoir uses unconventional, almost experimental, narrative techniques to not only convey the experience of Auschwitz but how she and her fellow survivors coped in the years afterwards.

== Summary ==
Auschwitz and After is a trilogy of separately published shorter works. None of Us Will Return (Aucun de nous ne reviendra) was completed in 1946 and published in 1965. Useless Knowledge (La connaissance inutile), written in 1946 and 1947, was published in 1970. The final volume, The Measure of Our Days (Mesure de nos jours) appeared in 1985.

The first and last volumes deal with Auschwitz as lived and remembered, respectively, and do not entirely follow linear time. The middle volume concerns the surviving Frenchwomen's slow journey back to freedom after they were moved from Auschwitz to Ravensbrück and ultimately turned over to the Swedish Red Cross, and is somewhat more linear.

== Technique ==
Delbo's guiding principle was, as she regularly described it, Essayez de regarder. Essayez pour voir, or roughly translated when it occurs as a refrain in her work, "Try to look. Just try and see." She knew that ordinary language could not begin to convey what she had experienced, and drew on her theatrical background and contemporary literary trends to produce a more postmodern text built around short vignettes, poems both titled and untitled and narrative fragments replete with repetition and sentence fragments that feel more like poetry. In the last volume, dealing with the survivors' efforts to reintegrate themselves into everyday French life, many sections read like oral histories told by individual survivors, not all of whom knew Delbo in camp.

The result has the effect of conveying the violence done to reason and orderly language by the horror of Auschwitz. "O You Who Know," ("Vous qui saviez") a poem early in the trilogy, challenges the reader with the inadequacy of what they already understand:

O you who know
Could you know that hunger makes the eyes sparkle?
While thirst makes them dim?

You who know
Could you know that you can see your mother dead
Without shedding a tear?

You who know
Could you know how in the morning you crave death
Only to fear it by evening?

"Horror cannot be circumscribed," she concludes, and throughout the trilogy she regularly expresses doubt as to whether she can truly tell the reader what it was like, whether anyone can.

You don't believe what we say
because
if what we say were true
we wouldn't be here to say it.
we'd have to explain
the inexplicable

"I am not sure that what I wrote is true," she wrote in the epigraph to the first volume, "I am certain that it is truthful." Resolving those two statements makes reading Auschwitz and After an advanced reading experience that more are slowly discovering.

== Editions ==
- (1995) Auschwitz and After. Yale University Press. ISBN 0-300-06208-7
