= Aurélien Saintoul =

French politician (born 1988)

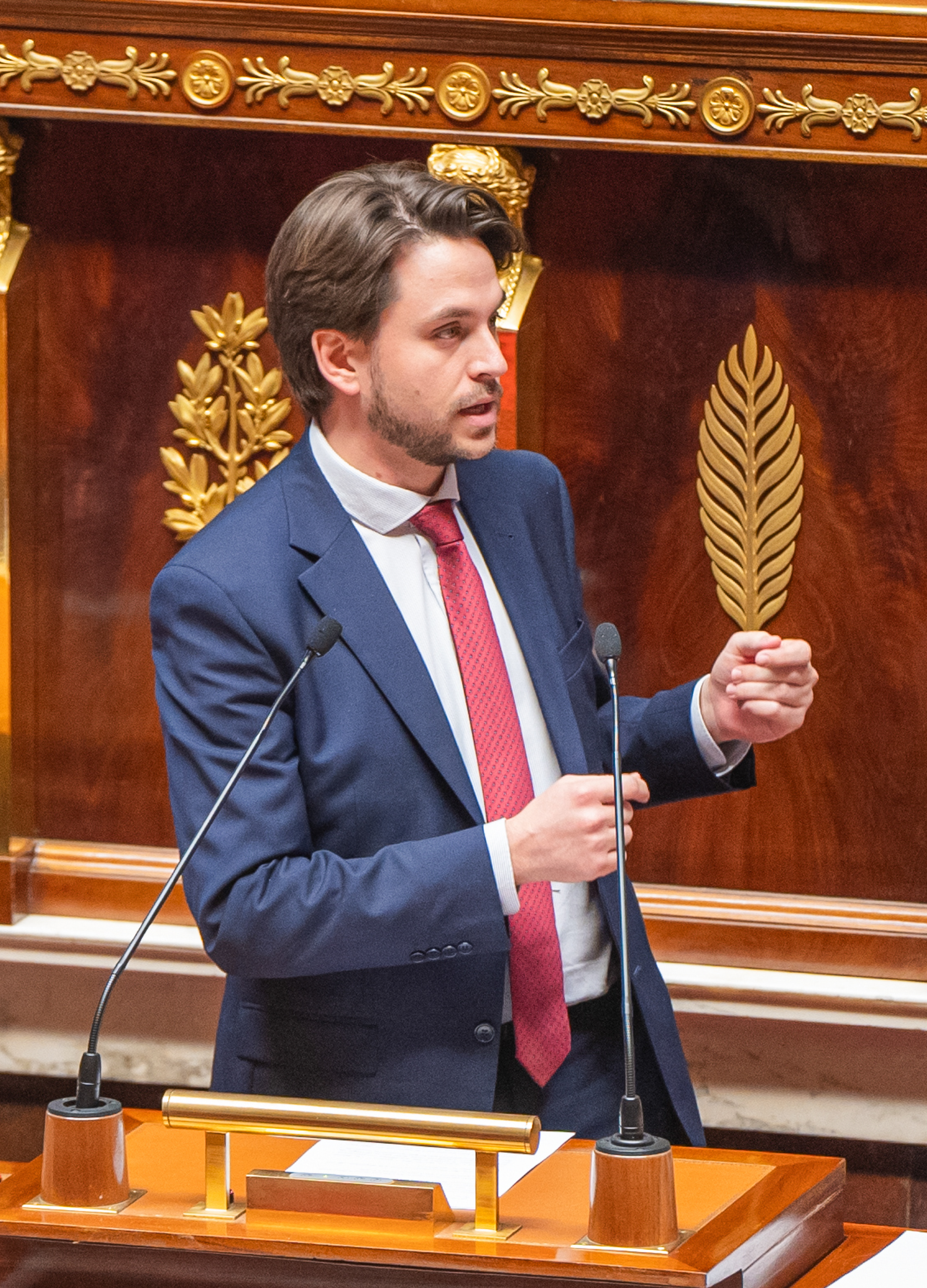
- Aurélien Saintoul in 2023

Member of the National Assembly for Hauts-de-Seine's 11th constituency
- Incumbent
- Assumed office 22 June 2022
- Preceded by: Laurianne Rossi

Personal details
- Born: 26 May 1988 (age 37) Drancy, France
- Party: La France Insoumise
- Other political affiliations: New Popular Front (2024); NUPES (2022)
- Profession: Teacher

Aurélien Saintoul (born 26 May 1988) is a French politician of La France Insoumise who has been representing Hauts-de-Seine's 11th constituency in the National Assembly since 2022. In the 2022 French legislative election he unseated En Marche MP Laurianne Rossi.

== See also ==
- List of deputies of the 16th National Assembly of France
- 2022 French legislative election
- 2024 French legislative election
