= Marie Politzer =

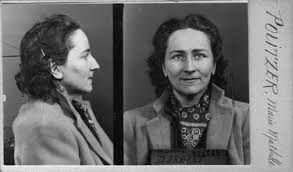
- Anthropometric photo of Marie Politzer taken on February 16, 1942 by the judicial identity department. Archives of the Préfecture de Police.
- Born: 1906; Biarritz
- Died: 1943 (aged 36–37); Auchwitz
- Cause of death: Typhus
- Known for: Communist activist, member of the French Resistance

Marie Politzer, née Larcade (1906–1943), also known as Maï Politzer, was a French communist activist and a member of the Resistance during World War II.

== Biography ==
=== Early life ===
Marie Politzer was born on August 15, 1906 in Biarritz. She is the daughter of Joseph Larcade and Hélène Mimiague. Joseph Larcade was a cook. In 1907, he was head cook at the French embassy in Saint Petersburg, where he lived with his wife, who worked as a linen maid. Back in Biarritz, he became head chef at the Hôtel du Palais, former residence of Empress Eugénie.

=== Education ===
Her family was Catholic and went to church every Sunday, the priest being a family friend. She did her secondary education in a convent in Biarritz. In 1922, at age 16, she completed her secondary education. On October 21, 1922, she obtained a steno-typist diploma from the Pigier school in Bayonne. On July 27, 1923, she obtained a diploma in commercial correspondence and, on the following November 28, a diploma in commercial studies. Then, she persuaded her parents to let her go to Paris to study midwifery. She registered at the medical school and took courses at Pitié-Salpêtrière. She then obtained her diploma on November 5, 1929.

=== Meeting with Georges Politzer ===
In 1929, she met Georges Politzer, a communist activist and Marxist philosopher, on a train, whom she married on March 5, 1931.

=== Resistance during World War II ===
She went into hiding during the Occupation. Georges Politzer wrote articles for resistance newspapers while Marie Politzer took charge of transporting the texts to the clandestine printing houses.

On February 15, 1942, she was arrested with Georges Politzer by the special brigade. She was sent to the Santé prison, then handed over to the German authorities and was transferred in August 1942 to Fort de Romainville. On January 24, 1943, she was deported to Auschwitz, where she worked as a doctor. The convoy was made up in particular of French member of the Resistance, most of them non-Jewish and mostly communists, including many widows of those who had been shot.

=== Death ===
She contracted typhus and died on March 6, 1943. After the Liberation, the distinction “mort pour la France” was granted on May 18, 1946 to Marie Politzer as well as a certificate of membership to the French Internal Resistance in 1950.

== Legacy ==
A street in Biarritz is named in her honor. A street in Paris is named after her and her husband.
