= Rue Danielle Casanova, Paris =

Street in Paris, France

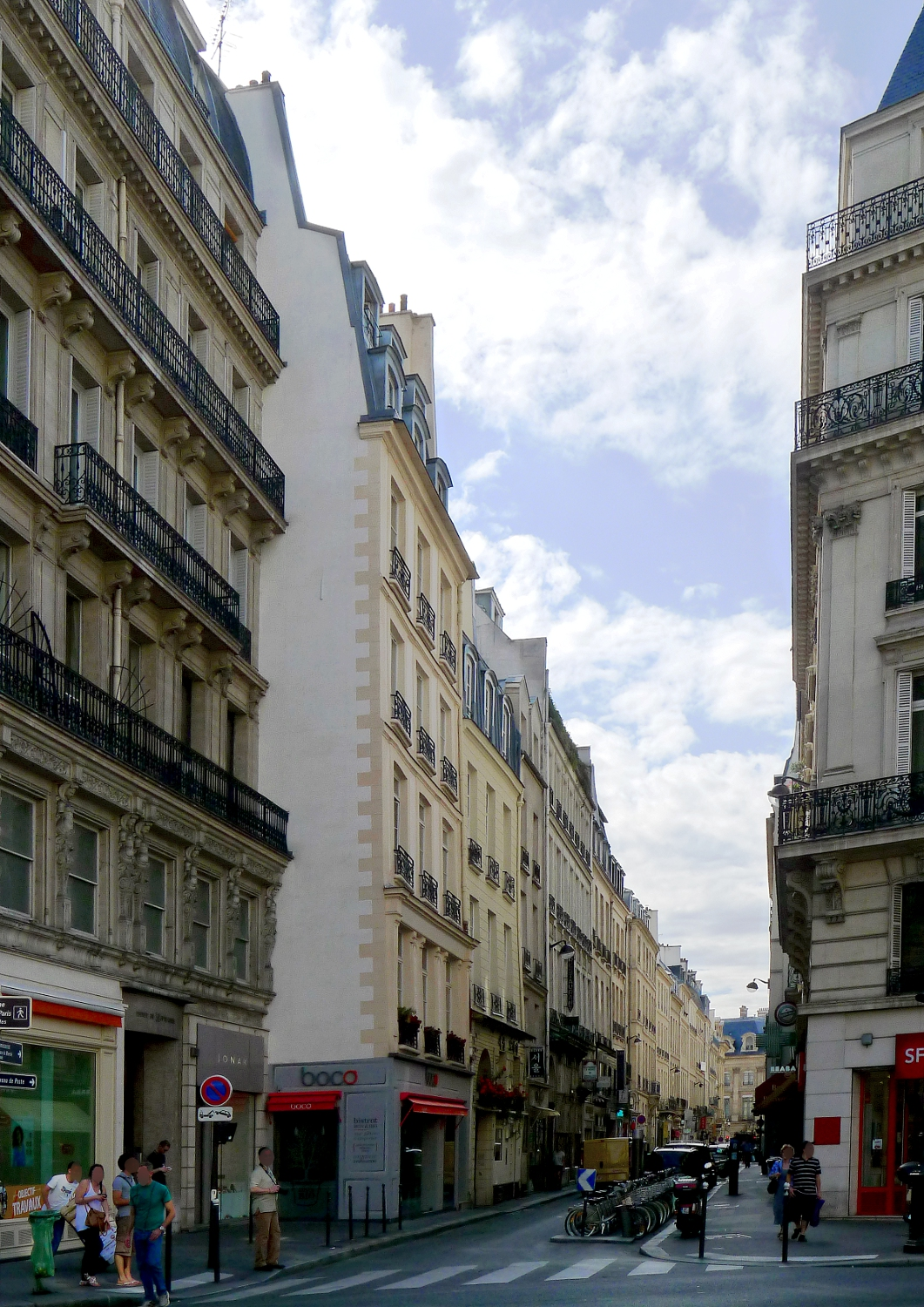
Rue Danielle Casanova, as seen from the Avenue de l'Opéra

The Rue Danielle Casanova (English: Danielle-Casanova Street) is a street in the 1st and 2nd arrondissements of Paris, France.

== History ==
The street is named after Danielle Casanova, a French communist activist and resistance fighter who died in deportation to the Auschwitz concentration camp in 1943.

== See also ==
- Transport in Paris
