= Danielle Casanova =

French Resistance hero and communist activist, deported to Auschwitz (1909–1943)

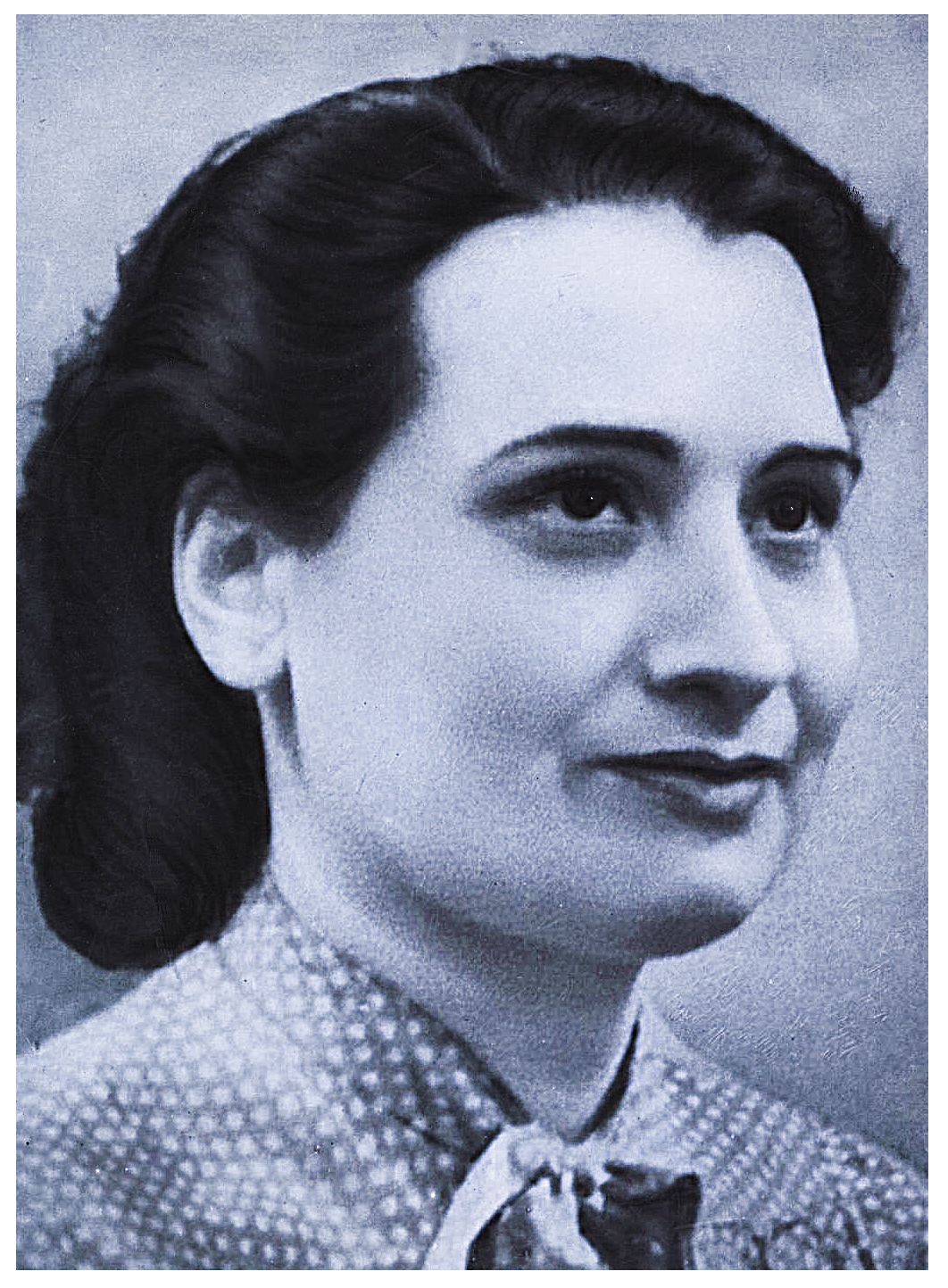
- Born: Vincentella Perini; 9 January 1909; Ajaccio, Corsica, France
- Died: 9 May 1943 (aged 34); Auschwitz, German-occupied Poland
- Cause of death: Typhus
- Occupations: Activist, journalist, dental surgeon
- Known for: French Resistance
- Political party: Communist
- Spouse: Laurent Casanova (m. 1933)
- Relatives: Emma Choury and Renée Perini (sisters)
- Awards: Legion of Honour

Danielle Casanova (French: [danjɛl kazanɔva]; born Vincentella Perini; 9 January 1909 – 9 May 1943) was a French communist activist and member of the French Resistance during World War II. A dentist by occupation, she was a high-ranking figure within the Communist Youth and founded its women's organisation Union des Jeunes Filles de France (UJFF, Union of Young French Women) in 1936. Casanova was arrested on 15 February 1942 as she brought coal to Georges Politzer and his wife; she had been involved in organising actions against the German occupiers. First incarcerated at La Santé Prison in Paris, she was transferred to the Fort de Romainville for causing unrest with the help of fellow prisoners. Casanova was deported to Auschwitz on 24 January 1943, where she began working as a dentist at the camp infirmary. She died of typhus shortly thereafter. She was posthumously awarded the Legion of Honour.

== Biography ==
Vincentella Périni was born on 9 January 1909 in Ajaccio, Corsica, to the schoolteacher parents Olivier and Marie Hyacinthe (née Versini). Nicknamed "Lella" as a child, she had three sisters and one brother. After finishing secondary school she moved to Paris in November 1927 to study dentistry.

In Paris, she became interested in politics and joined the Union Fédérale des Étudiants (Federal Union of Students), where she met her future husband, Laurent Casanova, another Corsican. In 1928 she joined the Young Communist League of France. She began to call herself "Danielle" and quickly became Group Secretary to the Faculty of Medicine. Still studying, she joined the Central Committee of the movement at the Seventh Congress of June 1932 as its only female member, and took up its direction in February 1934. Faced with the rapid expansion of the Communist Youth, the Eighth Congress in Marseille of 1936 charged her with creating the UJFF. This organisation, though similar to the Communist Youth, was aimed at creating a pacifist, anti-fascist movement. She was elected Secretary-General of the UJFF. At its First Congress in December 1936, she organised a collection of milk for young malnourished Spanish victims of the Civil War and helped collect and ship relief supplies to Spanish republican forces.

In October 1938, Danielle served as leader of the French delegation to the United States at the World Congress of Youth for Peace at Vassar College. When the French Communist Youth was banned in September 1939, Danielle Casanova went into hiding. She founded the newspaper Trait d'union (Hyphen). In October 1940, after the fall of France, she helped establish women's committees in the Paris region, while still writing for the underground press, especially Pensée Libre (Free Thought). She also founded Voix des Femmes (Women's Voice). She organised demonstrations against the occupying forces, including the events of 8 November and 11 November 1940 caused by Professor Paul Langevin's arrest, and also the demonstration of 14 July 1941 that she organised. On 2 August 1941 Casanova met Albert Ouzoulias in Montparnasse and placed him in charge of the Bataillons de la Jeunesse (Youth Battalions), fighting groups that were being created by the Jeunesses Communistes (Communist Youth).

On 11 February 1942, Danielle was arrested by French Police while entering the hiding place of a Jewish couple, Georges Politzer and his wife Maï, at 170 bis, rue de Grenelle in the 7th arrondissement. French Police of the Special Anticommunist Brigade (BS) had been following Danielle since 23 January after spotting her carrying a large suitcase to that same building (it contained coal for the Politzers). They were all taken to the Special Brigade headquarters where they were interrogated until 23 March. Danielle managed to get a letter to her mother.

At the end of March, she was moved to the German section of la Sante jail. On 24 August 1942 she was moved to the transit camp Fort de Romainville and handed over to the German authorities.

Transported to Auschwitz on 24 January 1943, she arrived on 27 January. She was assigned to the camp infirmary Revier to work as a dentist on the Kapos. She helped other women from the Convoi des 31000. (Note: Known as “Le Convoi des 31000” (so named for the numbers tattooed on their arms by the Nazis, representing the transport they arrived on), 230 women ranging in age from 17 to 67 were taken to the infamous Auschwitz concentration camp on 24 January 1943. They were the only group of non-Jewish women sent to death camps during the Nazi occupation; women from the French Resistance who clandestinely fought Nazis and the Vichy regime.) passing Maïe Politzer as a doctor and other women, including Madeleine Passot, as nurses. Even in jail and in concentration camp, Danielle did not stop campaigning and organising clandestine publications and events. She died of typhus on 9 May 1943.

Je suis morte pour la France (I am dead for France).

— Danielle Casanova's last words,

== Legacy ==
According to the biography that Simone Tery wrote about her in 1949 (Du Soleil Plein le Coeur), when news of her death reached her home in Corsica, “the church bells rang out in every village". Her ashes were later placed in the family grave in Vistale, a hamlet near Piana where there is a memorial to her. A heroine of French Resistance, she has lent her name to streets, schools, and colleges throughout France; notably Rue Danielle Casanova in Paris. A large SCNM ferry between Marseille and Corsica is called MS Danielle Casanova. She has been featured on a commemorative French postage stamp in 1983.

== See also ==
- Women in the French Resistance
- Rue Danielle Casanova, Paris
- Convoi des 31000
