= Georges Politzer =

French philosopher, Marxist theoretician, and Resistance member (1903–1942

Georges Politzer (French: [pɔlitsɛʁ]; born Politzer György, Hungarian: [ˈpolitsɛr ˈɟørɟ]; 3 May 1903 – 23 May 1942) was a Hungarian-born French philosopher and Marxist theoretician, referred to by some as the "red-headed philosopher" (philosophe roux). He published numerous works on philosophy and psychology, and taught courses in philosophy at the Workers' University of Paris. An active member of the French Communist Party, he participated in the Resistance to the German occupation of France in World War II, until he was arrested and killed by a Nazi firing squad at Fort Mont-Valérien in 1942.

== Biography ==
Politzer was born in 1903 into a Jewish bourgeois family in Nagyvárad, Kingdom of Hungary (it subsequently became the city of Oradea in Romania). His father was a medical doctor. As a teenager, Georges joined the Hungarian Communist Party and in 1919 supported the short-lived Hungarian Soviet Republic led by Béla Kun. After the Communist government was overthrown, a period known as the "White Terror" began in Hungary, marked by violent repression and anti-Semitism; it was followed by the establishment of a right-wing government under the regency of Admiral Miklós Horthy. To escape persecution, Georges fled to France.

While traveling across Europe, he met Sigmund Freud and Sándor Ferenczi in Vienna, and attended seminars offered by the Vienna Psychoanalytic Society, which stimulated a lifelong interest in psychology and Freudian theory. Politzer settled in the Latin Quarter of Paris in 1921. He then spent five years earning advanced degrees, including a certification for professorship in philosophy from Sorbonne University. He later said that he had learned the French language in Hungary through studying books by Voltaire and Diderot in his father's library.

In 1923 he married a fellow student, Camille Nony. They had two children, a son born in 1924 and a daughter in 1927. Politzer became a naturalized French citizen in December 1924. On a train in 1929 he met Marie "Maï" Larcade, a trained midwife whom he would marry two years later following his divorce from Camille. He and Maï had a son.

While completing his graduate studies, Politzer began teaching, initially at the lycée in Moulins, and then at the lycées in Cherbourg and Évreux. He was eventually hired as professor of philosophy at the Lycée Marcelin-Berthelot in Saint-Maur-des-Fossés. In the late 1920s, he published his first books on philosophy and psychology. He also co-founded and contributed articles for small intellectual journals such as Philosophies, Revue marxiste, and Revue de psychologie concrète.

In 1929, Politzer joined the French Communist Party (PCF). In 1932, the PCF established the Workers' University of Paris (Université Ouvrière de Paris), and Politzer taught a popular course there on dialectical materialism. He created and directed the PCF's center of documentation, and wrote a column in the daily newspaper L'Humanité. To fill a need in the PCF, he versed himself on economics. Starting in 1933, he led the economic commission of the PCF's central committee, and he wrote articles on economic subjects for L'Humanité and Les Cahiers du bolchévisme. In 1939 he co-founded, along with Paul Langevin and Georges Cogniot, La Pensée, which dubbed itself a "Revue du rationalisme moderne" (Journal of Modern Rationalism).

After the French surrender to Nazi Germany in June 1940, Politzer sought to organize his fellow intellectuals and academics in opposing the German occupation. In September 1940, he joined the French Resistance. Two months later, he along with Jacques Solomon and Jacques Decour launched a clandestine newspaper, L'Université libre. They followed that up with another new publication, La Pensée libre, in February 1941. The inaugural issue of L'Université libre told of the recent German arrest of physicist Paul Langevin, and denounced the anti-Semitic actions of Vichy France and the occupying German army.

On 15 February 1942, Politzer's Resistance activities came to a halt when he and his wife Maï (also a Communist and member of La Résistance) were arrested by the Brigades Spéciales, the French police force targeting "internal enemies". The arrests were part of a larger dragnet that rounded up nearly 150 Communists. Politzer was tortured, and then turned over to the Nazis on 20 March 1942. He was executed by firing squad on 23 May 1942. Maï was transported to Auschwitz-Birkenau, where she died of typhus in March 1943.

In 1949, Georges and Maï were posthumously awarded a certificate for having belonged to the French internal Resistance under the National Front movement. However, France's Ministry of Veterans and Civilian War Victims refused to grant the couple the extra honor of being commemorated as "imprisoned Resistance members", the argument being that their arrests were political in nature and not due to acts of resistance against the enemy. A petition filed by Maï's mother Hélène Larcade finally led to a June 1956 reversal of the previous Ministry decisions, and Georges and Maï were officially recognized as internees and deportees of the Resistance. In November 1999, a street was named after Georges and Maï Politzer in the 12th arrondissement of Paris.

== Theoretical contributions ==
In his philosophical writings, Politzer was an orthodox Marxist-Leninist who sought to explain and defend a science-based materialism. Helena Sheehan said of Politzer:

He stressed the initimate relationship between dialectical materialism and modern science. Philosophical questions concerning matter were to be answered by science. Philosophy was dependent on science and the state of empirical knowledge at any given time. Dialectical materialism had developed, not only on the basis of the results of science, but under the influence of the spirit of science. As science had achieved a more profound knowledge of nature, the interconnections of the sciences had come to be seen with greater clarity. Dialectics, with its understanding of change, reciprocal interaction, contradiction, and progress by leaps, represented a new spirit of science.

Politzer's philosophical ideas were captured in a posthumously published volume, Elementary Principles of Philosophy (1946). It was a compilation of lecture notes from his Workers' University course on dialectical materialism. When the book was republished in 1976 with a new English translation, Henry Mims noted in his review: "There has been some criticism of Politzer in France recently, describing his view of Marxism as simplistic. Such criticism seems unfair. If one is going to deal with Hume and Kant, Marx and Hegel, Berkeley and Diderot, the philosophy of science and the philosophy of history, the interrelation of thought and action, all within a few pages, one is going to have to get along without spelling everything out. Not only that, but the details have to be omitted at the outset if the broad outlines, the 'elementary principles', are to be discerned. This was what Politzer set out to do in his workers' school courses, and this is what his little book achieves with distinction."

After WWII, Politzer began to be recognized for his scholarly contributions to psychology. He had shown an early interest in the subject as evidenced by the 1928 publication of his Critique des Fondements de la Psychologie (Critique of the Foundations of Psychology), which is considered one of the first attempts at a materialist approach to social psychology, or what he termed a "concrete psychology". He argued that traditional psychology was too abstract, and hailed psychoanalysis as revolutionary:

[P]sychoanalysis, far from being an enrichment of classical psychology, is actually the demonstration of its defeat. It constitutes the first phase of breaking away from the traditional ideal of psychology, with its inspiring occupations and strengths; the first escape from the field of influence which has held it prisoner for centuries, the same as behaviorism is the premonition of the next break with its notions and fundamental conceptions.

But after being intrigued by Freudian theory, Politzer started to distance himself from it as incompatible with Marxism.

At a psychiatric conference in September 1946, Jacques Lacan called Politzer a "great thinker" who "advocated the foundation of a 'concrete psychology'". Two decades later, Louis Althusser challenged Politzer's critique, insisting instead that psychoanalysis possessed "authentic scientific concepts". A May 2022 article in History of Psychology assessed Politzer's intellectual influence, especially his role in interpreting psychoanalysis from a Marxist perspective.

When summing up Politzer's theoretical work, Sheehan wrote that he "devoted himself to polemics, not only against Freudianism, but against a variety of other intellectual trends vying with Marxism at the time, particularly Bergsonism. He fully identified Marxism with modern rationalism, characterizing it as the only vehicle capable of carrying forward the best of French intellectual traditions and the surest bulwark against the threat of all forms of modern irrationalism."

== Published works ==
- Philosophical Investigations into the Essence of Human Freedom (Recherches philosophiques sur l'essence de la liberté humaine et sur les problèmes qui s'y rattachent), French translation by Politzer of a work by Friedrich Schelling, 1926, OCLC 1193132307
- Critique of the Foundations of Psychology (Critique des Fondements de la Psychologie), 1928, OCLC 80183437
- The End of a Philosophical Charade: Bergsonism (La fin d'une parade philosophique: Le bergsonisme), 1929, originally published under the pseudonym "François Arouet", OCLC 1124126067
- "Médecine ou philosophie?" and "Le mythe de l'antipsychanalyse", 1929, two articles by Politzer in the literary and philosophical review, Philosophies, that he helped found along with other Sorbonne students
- "Who Do You Write For?", 1933, speech given by Politzer at a meeting of the Association des Ecrivains et Artistes Révolutionnaires (Association of Revolutionary Writers and Artists – A.E.A.R.)
- A Course on Marxism (Cours de Marxisme, Première année. 1935-1936), 1936, OCLC 459557383
- "The Tri-centennial of the Discourse on Method", La Correspondance internationale, 1937
- The Great Problems of Contemporary Philosophy (Les Grands Problèmes de la Philosophie Contemporaine), Bureau d'Éditions, 1938, OCLC 26965426
- "Philosophy and Myths (La Philosophie et les Mythes)", La Pensée, 1939
- "The Philosophy of the Enlightenment and Modern Thought (La Philosophie des Lumières et la Pensée moderne)", La Pensée, 1939
- "What is Rationalism? (Qu'est-ce que le rationalisme?)", La Pensée, 1939
- "The End of Psychoanalysis (La Fin de la Psychanalyse)", La Pensée, 1939
- "In the blind man's cellar, a chronicle of contemporary obscurantism (Dans la cave de l'aveugle, chronique de l'obscurantisme contemporain)", La Pensée, 1939
- "After the Death of M. Bergson", La Pensée, February 1941
- Antisemitism, Racism, and the Jewish Problem (L'antisémitisme, le racisme, le problème juif), 1941, OCLC 459557372
- Obscurantism in the 20th century (L'Obscurantisme au xxe siècle), 1941, OCLC 765686791
- Elementary Principles of Philosophy (Principes Élémentaires de Philosophie), 1946, lecture notes from Politzer's philosophy course at l'Université Ouvrière de Paris, preface by Maurice Le Goas, OCLC 12753129
- Revolution and Counter-revolution in the 20th Century (Révolution et Contre-révolution au XXè Siècle; réponse à "Or et sang" de M. Rosenberg), Éditions Sociales, 1947, OCLC 1196356850
- La Crise de la Psychologie Contemporaine, Éditions Sociales, 1947, OCLC 6618099
- Fundamental Principles of Philosophy (Principes Fondamentaux de Philosophie), edited by Guy Besse and Maurice Caveing, 1954, Éditions Sociales, OCLC 5529222
- Writings 1: Philosophy and Myths (Écrits 1: La Philosophie et les Mythes), Éditions Sociales, 1969, OCLC 925993522
- Writings 2: The Foundations of Psychology (Écrits 2: Les Fondements de la Psychologie), Éditions Sociales, 1969, OCLC 925993533
- Against Bergson and some other writers: Philosophical Writings (Contre Bergson et quelques autres: Écrits philosophiques 1924-1939), 2013, ISBN 978-2081286382

== See also ==
- Jacques Solomon
- Jacques Decour
- Valentin Feldman
- Paul Langevin
- Charlotte Delbo
- List of Holocaust victims
