= Les Lettres Françaises =

French literary publication

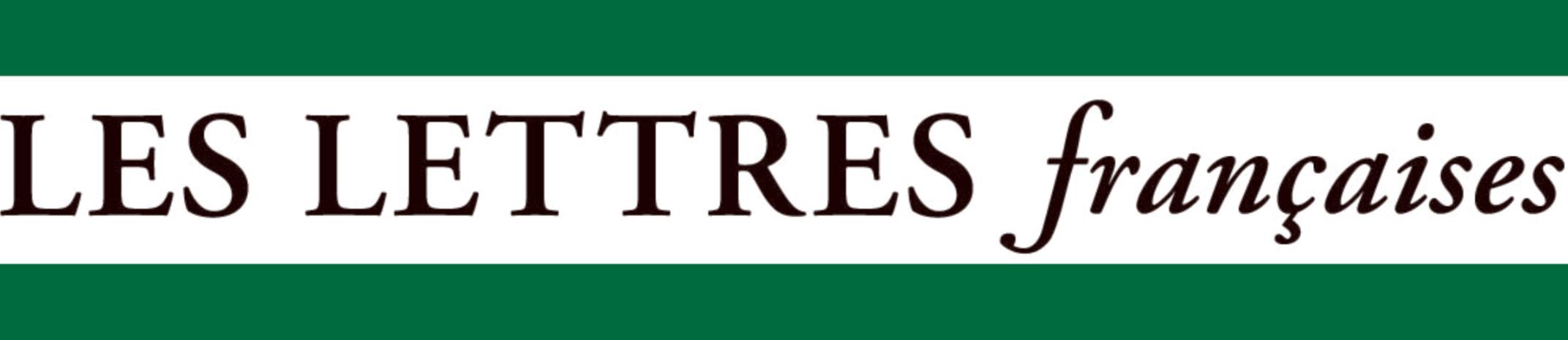
- Categories: Literature
- Frequency: Monthly
- Founder: Jacques Decour and Jean Paulhan
- Founded: 1941
- Country: France
- Language: French
- ISSN: 0024-1393

Les Lettres Françaises (French pronunciation: [le lɛtʁ fʁɑ̃sɛz], "The French Letters") is a French literary publication, founded in 1941 by writers Jacques Decour and Jean Paulhan. Originally a clandestine magazine of the French Resistance in German-occupied territory, it was one of the many publications of the National Front resistance movement. It received contributions from Louis Aragon, François Mauriac, Claude Morgan, Édith Thomas, Georges Limbour, Raymond Queneau and Jean Lescure.

After the Liberation and until 1972, Les Lettres Françaises, managed by Aragon, was financially supported by Soviet government and the French Communist Party. Originally supportive of Stalinism, the paper became critical of the Soviet regime during the 1960s, and ceased publication after losing communist support. It was revived in the 1990s as a monthly literary supplement of the left-wing newspaper L'Humanité.

== History ==
=== Lysenkoism ===
The newspaper frequently served as a reflector of Soviet state propaganda, in late 40's engaging in defense of pseudo-scientific Lysenkoism. Pierre Daix wrote "French scientists recognize superiority of Soviet science" article which was then reprinted in Eastern Bloc newspaper, intending to create an impression that Lysenkoism was already accepted by the whole progressive world.

=== Kravchenko case ===
In 1949, Soviet dissident Victor Kravchenko sued the newspaper in a polemical and a sensational trial. After the publication of his book I Chose Freedom, which denounced the Soviet Gulag camps, Les Lettres Françaises accused him of being an agent of the United States, and backed this claim with false documents written by journalist André Ulmann (who worked for Soviet intelligence). The truth about the origin of these documents were not known until the late 1970s.

Kravchenko filed a complaint for defamation against the newspaper, which was defended by counsel Joe Nordmann. The trial, dubbed "the trial of the century", held in 1949 brought together a hundred witnesses. The Soviet Union presented Kravchenko's former colleagues and his former wife to denounce him. Kravchenko's legal team enlisted testimonies from the survivors of Soviet prison camps. Among them was Gulag survivor Margarete Buber-Neumann (widow of the German Communist leader Heinz Neumann). At the time of Molotov–Ribbentrop Pact, she had moved to Nazi Germany and was again imprisoned. Her experience helped anti-communist groups in stating that there was a close similarity between the Soviet and the Nazi regimes. The trial was won by Kravchenko in April 1949, and he received a nominal sum for libel.

=== Disappearance and reemergence ===
Les Lettres Françaises was edited by Aragon between 1953 and 1972. During this interval, it supported De-Stalinization and liberalization efforts, looked with sympathy toward the Prague Spring, and, in August 1968, criticized the Soviet invasion of Czechoslovakia. The latter decision proved problematic, as the Soviet government decided to withdraw its subsidies, as did the French Communist Party. Consequently, the review was stripped of its financial lifeline and eventually ceased publication.

Since the 1990s, the literary magazine is published on the first Saturday of each month, with the newspaper L'Humanité. It has columns on Letters, Arts, Cinema, Theater and Music, and publishes the works of debuting prose writers and poets. Its new head editor is Jean Ristat.
