= Laurent Casanova =

French politician

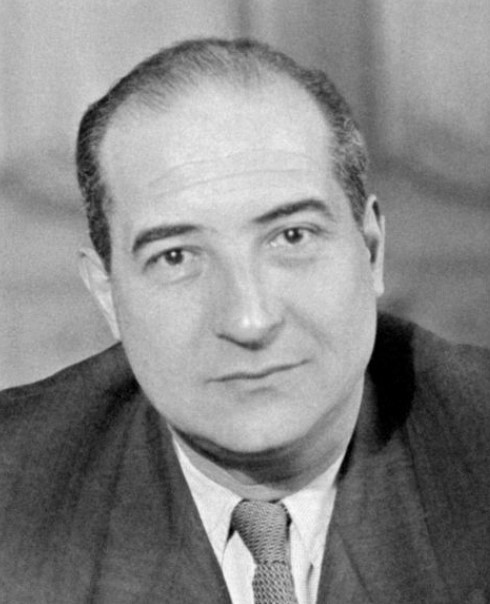

1st Minister of Veterans
- In office 26 January 1946 – 8 July 1946
- Preceded by: Position established (Henri Frenay as Minister of Pensions)
- Succeeded by: Max Lejeune

Member of the National Assembly from Seine-et-Marne
- In office 28 November 1946 – 8 December 1958

Member of the Provisional Consultative Assembly
- In office 3 June 1944 – 25 July 1944

Personal details
- Born: Laurent Casanova; October 9, 1906 Souk Ahras, French Algeria
- Died: March 20, 1972 (aged 65) Paris, France
- Party: Communist
- Other political affiliations: Francs-Tireurs et Partisans
- Spouse(s): Vincentelli Perini (m. 1933; died 1943) Claudine Chomat
- Awards: Lenin Peace Prize

Laurent Casanova (9 October 1906 — 20 March 1972) was a French politician and resistance fighter. He was a Communist deputy for Seine-et-Marne from 1945 to 1958 and Minister of Veterans and War Victims in 1946.

== Biography ==
=== Political career ===
Born in Souk Ahras, Algeria and of Corsican origins, Casanova studied law at university in Paris. He became secretary of the Communist cell there, and he entered the underground apparatus of the French Communist Party (PCF) in 1928, when he was just twenty-one years old. By 1936, he had become a close associate of Maurice Thorez, the party's secretary-general. Drafted into the French armed forces in 1939, Casanova was promptly taken prisoner; however, he escaped and resumed contact with the party through an intermediary, Claudine Chomat, in March 1942.

Initially, he worked in the communist resistance with Pierre Villon, a period during which he met Pablo Picasso and Louis Aragon. He then served the National Military Committee of the FTP (Francs-Tireurs et Partisans), whose leader, Charles Tillon, proposed Casanova as the FTP's representative to the Provisional Consultative Assembly of 1944 in Algiers, but he never attended.

At the time of the liberation (August 1944), he was elected to be a delegate for Seine-et-Marne to two national constituent assemblies and then to the National Assembly of France itself, a position he held for the duration of the French Fourth Republic (1946–1958). He was Minister for Veterans and War Victims in the provisional governments of Félix Gouin and Georges Bidault from 26 January to 8 July 1946.

He became an associate member of the central committee of the French Communist Party (PCF) in July 1945 and then an alternate to the National Office in June 1947, and, lastly, a full member in June 1954, at the time of the Thirteenth Congress of the PCF. He represented the party in the Peace Movement, replacing Charles Tillon, who stepped down in 1952 (in connection with his association with André Marty). At the PCF, he was responsible for relations with intellectuals and with youth.

After the revelations of the Twentieth Congress of the Soviet Communist Party, during which Nikita Khrushchev denounced the "cult of personality" surrounding Joseph Stalin, Casanova became a Soviet representative to the governing bodies of PCF, a reaction favorable to Casanova based on a liberalizing change of style and thought in Russia. He had the support of Khrushchev he received the Lenin Peace Prize in 1960. However, Thorez managed to block the "aggiornamento" (trend to "bring things up to date") and eliminated Casanova from all governing bodies in May 1961. Marcel Servin and Maurice Kriegel-Valrimont were also victims of the purge.

=== Personal life ===
He married Danielle Casanova (born Vincentelli Perini), who died at Auschwitz, and later, he married Claudine Chomat, whom he had also known, before the war, in the communist youth movement.

He died in Paris.

=== Works ===
Casanova published various different pamphlets and books. His most famous work is named The Communist Party, the intellectuals, and the nation.

== See also ==
- French Communist Party
- Servin-Casanova Case

== Bibliography ==
Philip Robrieux devotes a few pages in his monumental biography of Maurice Thorez (4 volumes) to "The Inside Story of the French Communist Party" (V.2, p. 499–503 and V. 4, p. 126–127)
