= Marie-Hélène Amiable =

French politician (born 1960)

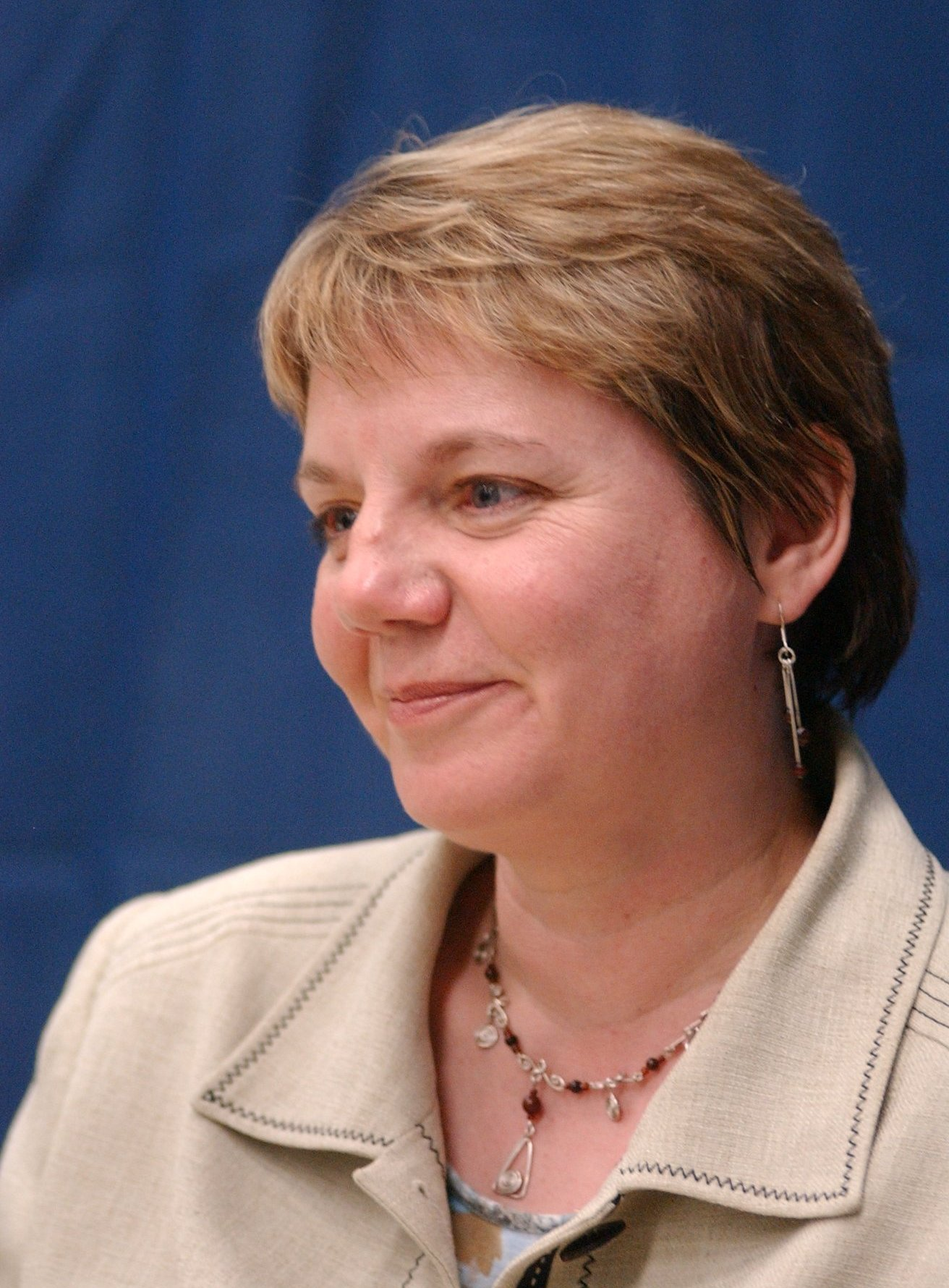

Mayor of Bagneux
- Incumbent
- Assumed office 16 May 2004
- Preceded by: Janine Jambu

Departmental councillor of Hauts-de-Seine for the Canton of Bagneux
- In office 2 April 2015 – 27 June 2021
- Preceded by: Patrick Alexanian
- Succeeded by: Hélène Cillières

Member of the National Assembly for Hauts-de-Seine's 11th constituency
- In office 20 June 2007 – 19 June 2012
- Preceded by: Janine Jambu
- Succeeded by: Julie Sommaruga

Personal details
- Born: 14 March 1960 (age 66) Paris, France
- Party: PCF
- Profession: Teacher

Marie-Hélène Simone Monique Amiable (born 14 March 1960) is a French politician who has served as the Mayor of Bagneux since 2004. She also served as Member of the National Assembly for the Hauts-de-Seine's 11th constituency from 2007 to 2012. Amiable is a member of the French Communist Party (PCF) and sat in the Democratic and Republican Left group in the National Assembly.

== Biography ==
=== Early life and family ===
Marie-Hélène Simone Monique Amiable was born on 14 March 1960 in the 11th arrondissement of Paris. She also works as a teacher and has one child.

=== Political career ===
==== Mayor of Bagneux ====
Since 1989, Amiable has served as a municipal councillor of Bagneux, Hauts-de-Seine, as a member of the French Communist Party. She served as deputy mayor from March 1989 to March 2001 and was then elected mayor on 15 May 2004. Amiable was re-elected in 2008, 2014 and 2020.

During the 2020 French municipal elections, Amiable led an electoral list called Bagneux Pour Tous, Tous Pour Bagneux that united several left-wing parties. She won re-election with 60.74% of the vote in the first round, ahead of Patrice Martin of the Union of Democrats and Independents with 20.75%, Fatima Kadouci of La République En Marche! with 10.29% and three other lists.

Every year, Amiable and other Communist mayors in Hautes-de-Seine participate in a protest against the explosion of homeless people from shelter after the winter holidays.

==== Member of the National Assembly ====
During the 2007 French legislative elections, Amiable was elected Member of the National Assembly for Hauts-de-Seine's 11th constituency with 58.58% of the vote, defeating Jean-Loup Metton of the Union for French Democracy and Union for a Popular Movement. Her designated substitute was Catherine Margaté, general councillor of the Canton of Malakoff since 1994 and mayor of Malakoff since 1996.

Amiable lost her seat in the 2012 legislative elections, winning 29.2% of the vote compared to Julie Sommaruga of the Socialist Party with 29.93% in the first round. As required by the agreements between left-wing parties in the election, Amiable withdrew from the race and endorsed Sommaruga in the second round.

== Honours and decorations ==
Marie-Hélène Amiable was named chevalier (knight) of the Ordre national du Mérite on 14 March 2013 due to her 29 years of service as a Member of the National Assembly and Mayor of Bagnueux. She also became a chevalier of the Legion of Honour on 14 April 2017 because of her 36 years of service as a departmental councillor of Hauts-de-Seine and Mayor of Bagnueux.
