= Mouvement Jeunes Communistes de France =

Communist youth organisation in France

Young Communists Movement of France Mouvement Jeunes Communistes de France
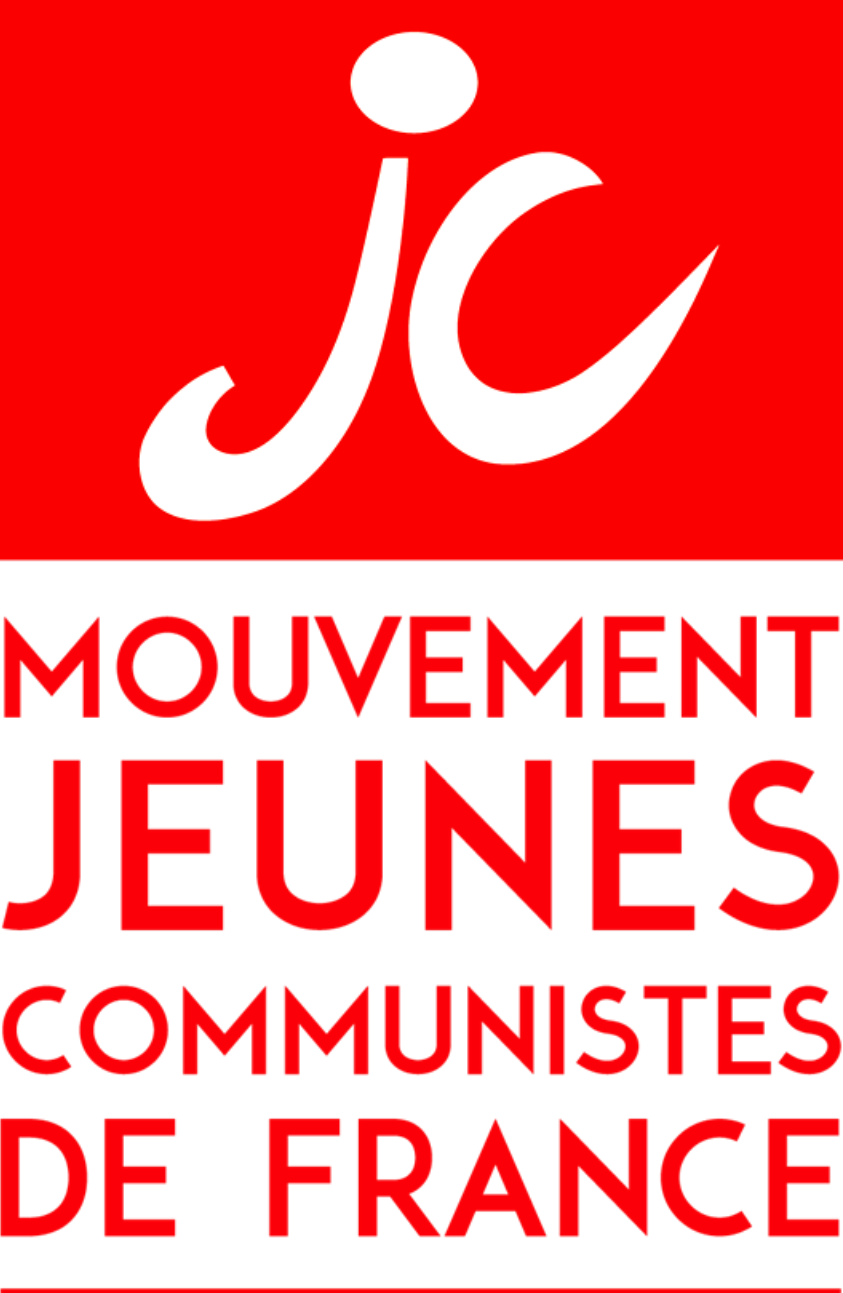
- Secretary General: Bastien Bonnargent
- Founded: 1912 (JS); 1920 (FJCF); 1945 (UJRF); 1956 (MJCF)
- Headquarters: 2, Place du Colonel Fabien, Paris
- Membership: 15,000 (2016)
- Ideology: Communism
- Colours: Red
- International affiliation: World Federation of Democratic Youth (WFDY)
- Magazine: Avant-garde
- Website: jeunes-communistes.fr

The Mouvement Jeunes communistes de France (MJCF), commonly called the "JC" (for Jeunesse Communiste, historically its first name), is the first political youth organisation of France, close to the French Communist Party (PCF).

The MJCF is organised independently of the PCF, deciding its laws, structure and leaders as well as its stances, while continuously engaging with the party about the actions and stances to take in keeping with a transformational vision of society.

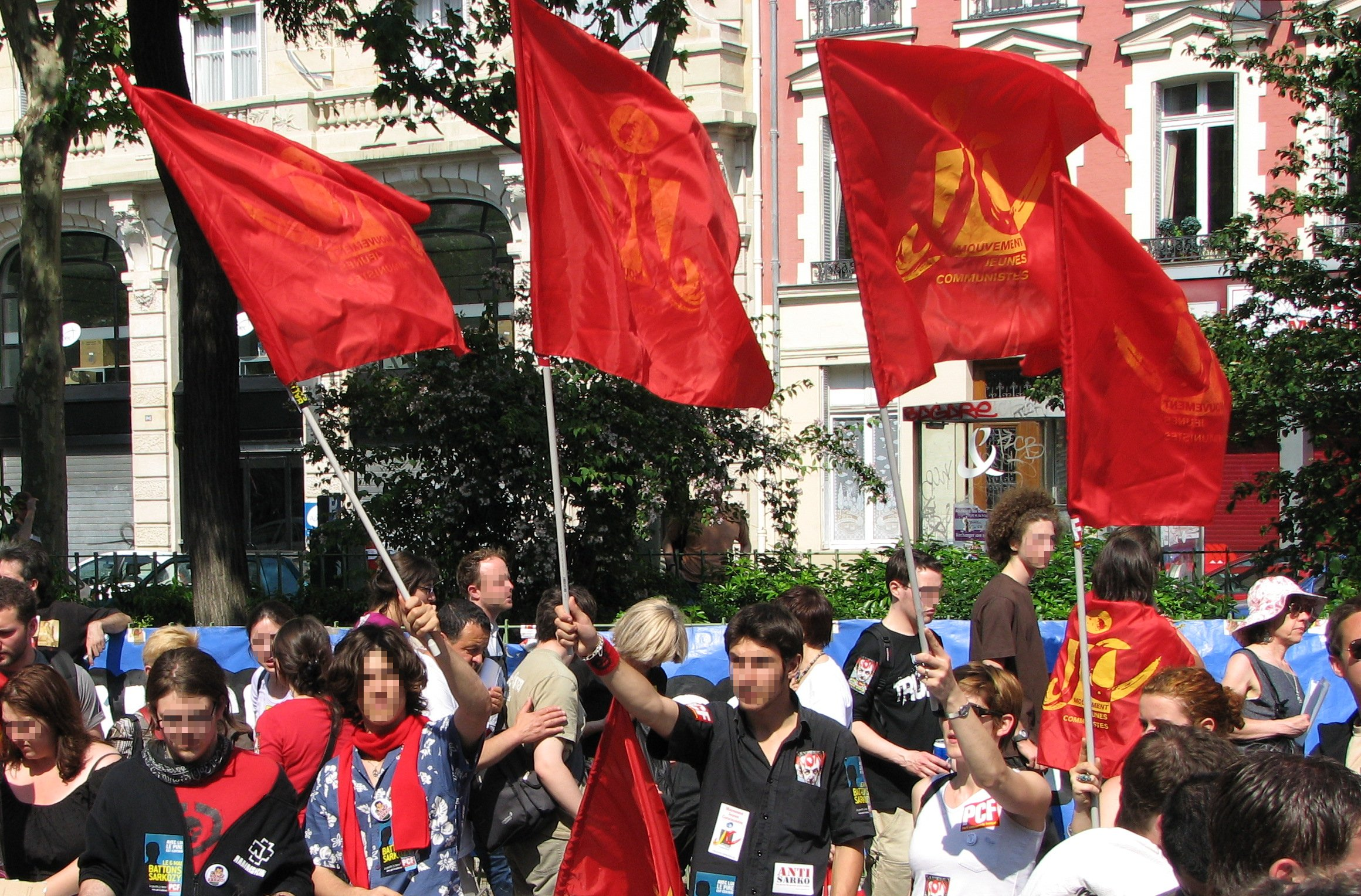
Jeunesse communiste demonstrators, May 2007

The MJCF was founded in 1920 as the "Fédération nationale des jeunesses socialistes-communistes de France", a split of the Youg socialists, under the auspices of the Tours Congress. Its secretary general is Bastien Bonnargent, elected at the time of the ANA of 23 May 2026. According to its own statistics, the movement counts 15,000 members in France.

The MJCF publishes a quarterly journal, Avant-garde. It is part of the World Federation of Democratic Youth and was part of the European Network of Democratic Young Left (ENDYL) until its dissolution.

The MJCF contains the Union des étudiants communistes student grouping, which directs its own institutions to meet the specific demands of militancy in higher education.

== Campaigns and current stances ==
The MJCF, being an autonomous organization, leads its own campaigns as well as aiding in those of the PCF. Campaigns of the 2000s include:

- Paix et solidarité (Peace and solidarity)
  - Contre la guerre, on ne dépose pas nos armes (Against war – we won't put down our weapons): Launched at the beginning of 2003 at the time of the movement against the Iraq War, this campaign sought to fight against the war and the occupation, and to promote pacifist ideas amongst young people.
  - Libérez Marwan Barghouti (Free Marwan Barghouti): campaign for the liberation of the Palestinian ex deputy leader Marwan Barghouti, imprisoned in Israel since 2002. The MJCF, who consider Barhouti a political prisoner, strongly criticized what they saw as an unjust trial, as well as the conditions in which he has been detained.
  - Free Mumia!: Campaign for the liberation of Mumia Abu-Jamal, an American sentenced to death, whom the MJCF also considers a victim of a rigged trial. Beyond this campaign, the MJCF intends to lead a broader fight against the death penalty throughout the world.
- Lutte contre les discriminations (Struggle against discrimination)
  - Lutte anti-fasciste et contre l'extrême droite (Struggle against fascism and the extreme right): the MJCF regularly publishes tracts and leaflets analysing the policies of the extreme right, particularly the French Front national movement.
- Emploi, formation et lutte contre la précarité (Employment, training and the struggle against job insecurity)
  - Un emploi ou une formation pour tous ? Je crois que ça va ~~pas~~ être possible (A job a training for everyone? I believe that's ~~im~~possible), the slogan around which the MJCF based their campaign for the establishment of job and training security, a broad project of social transformation seeking to eliminate unemployment and to guarantee a real and lifelong right to training.
  - Campagne contre la loi Fillon (Campaign against Fillon's law): the MJCF, particularly its schools network has actively participated in the spring 2005 movement against Fillon's law to reform secondary school teaching.
  - États généraux des lycées (general states of schools): an initiative launched by the MJCF seeking to organize in as many schools so that they may become involved in the campaign against Fillon's law, and so that they can express their grievances with the current system and their hopes for a better school.
  - Loi pour la Réussite dans l'Enseignement Supérieur (Law for success in higher education): initiative launched by the UCE with the goal of establishing a law which puts forward a real alternative to the liberal project for higher education (which the UCE considers as having been served by the recent reforms).

MJCF was particularly involved in the campaign of the left to vote "no" in the French referendum on a treaty for a European constitution. In 2006, the MJCF was also involved in the movement against the Contrat première embauche and was an active member of the collectif jeune (young collective) against the CPE. The MJCF also participated in the collective Unis contre l'immigration jetable where it fought against the projet de loi relatif à l'immigration et à l'intégration of Nicolas Sarkozy.

At the MJCF congress which took place on 14–17 December 2006 at Ivry-sur-Seine the MJCF decided to direct its struggles along four essential lines, called Quatre chantiers pour changer nos vies et la société (four projects to change our lives and society)

- Précarités (insecurity)
- Vivre ensemble (living together)
- Monde (world)
- Savoirs/éducation (knowledge/education)

The content of these projects directed the MJCF, at the national council of January 2007, to campaign for Marie-George Buffet in the French presidential election of 2007, as a candidate for the popular anti-liberal left.

== See also ==
- Union des étudiants communistes
- Parti communiste français
- World Federation of Democratic Youth
