= France Bloch-Sérazin =

French resistance fighter

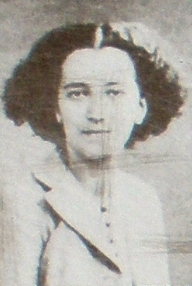
- Born: Françoise Bloch; 21 February 1913; 18th arrondissement of Paris, French Third Republic
- Died: 12 February 1943 (aged 29); Hamburg, Nazi Germany
- Cause of death: Execution by guillotine
- Education: University of Poitiers
- Spouse: Frédéric "Frédo" Sérazin
- Children: Roland Sérazin
- Parents: Jean-Richard Bloch (father); Marguerite Herzog (mother)
- Relatives: André Maurois (maternal uncle); Pierre Abraham (paternal uncle); Louise Bloch (grandmother)
- Honours: Legion of Honor, Resistance Medal; War Cross

France Bloch-Sérazin (French pronunciation: [fʁɑ̃s blɔʃseʁazɛ̃]; 1913–1943) was a French chemist and militant communist who fought in the French resistance against German occupation during World War II.

== Biography ==
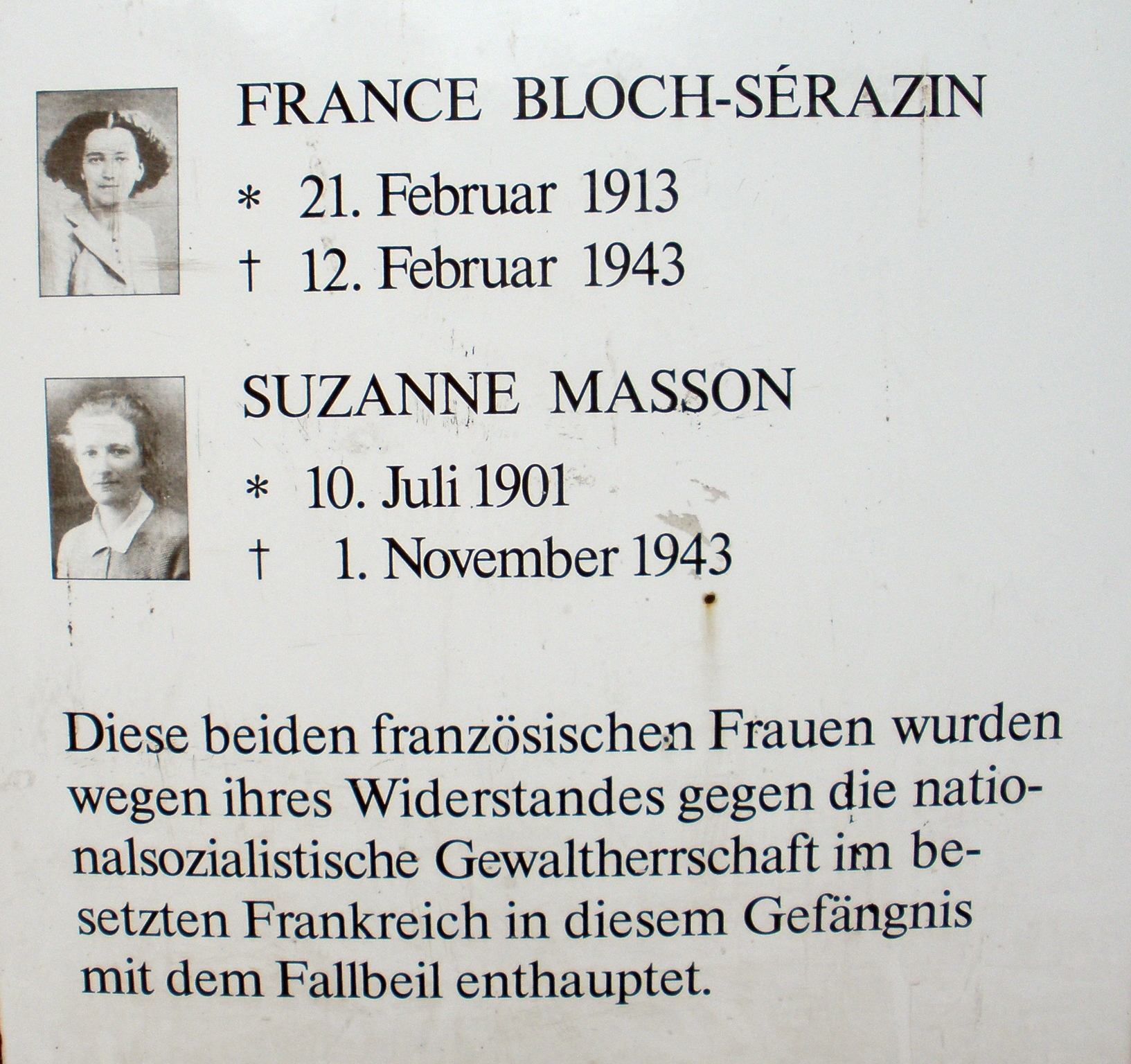
Commemorative plaque on the back of the Holstenglacis remand center in Hamburg.

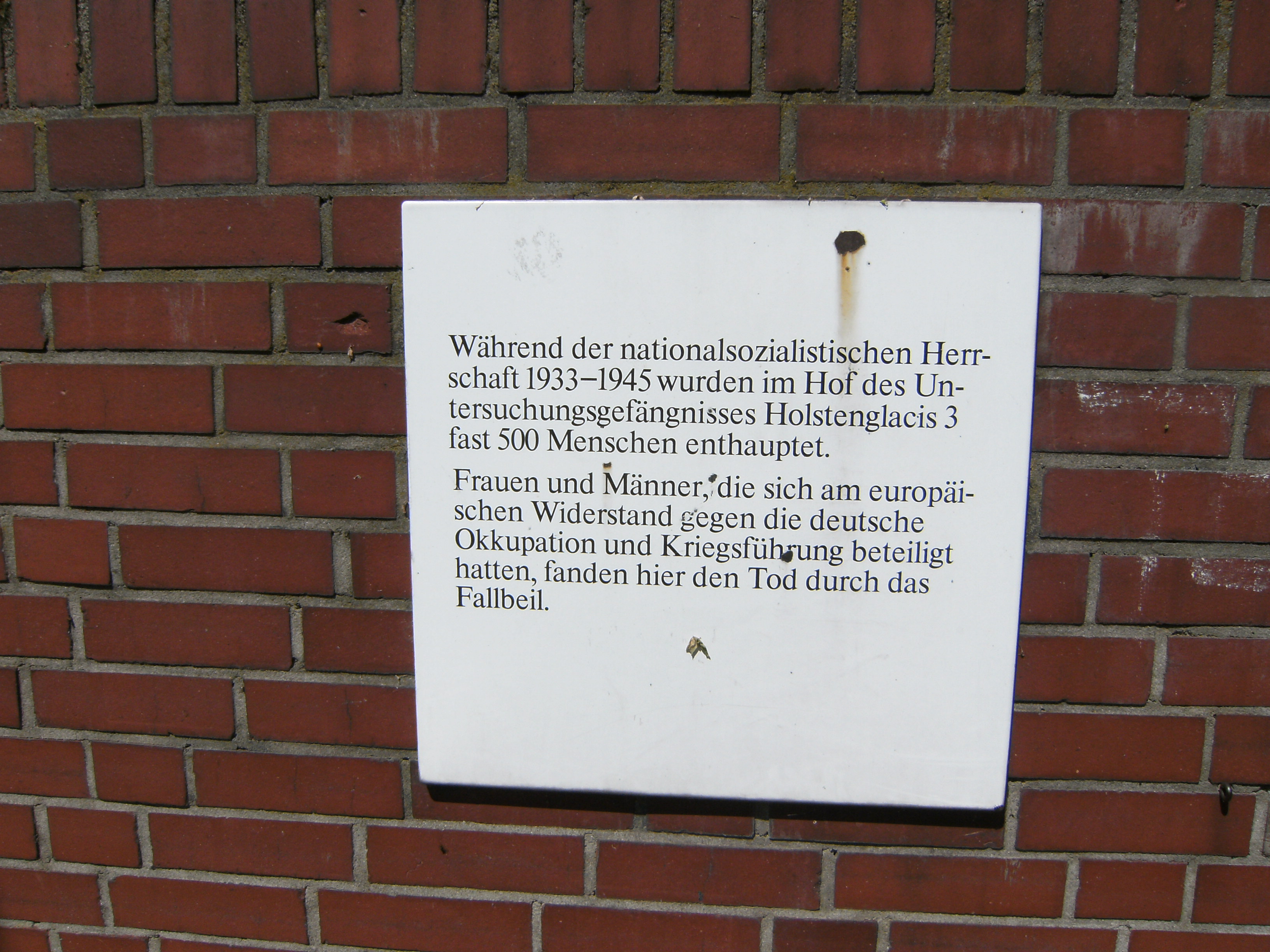
Plaque memorializing European resistance executions located at the back of the prison in Hamburg, Germany.

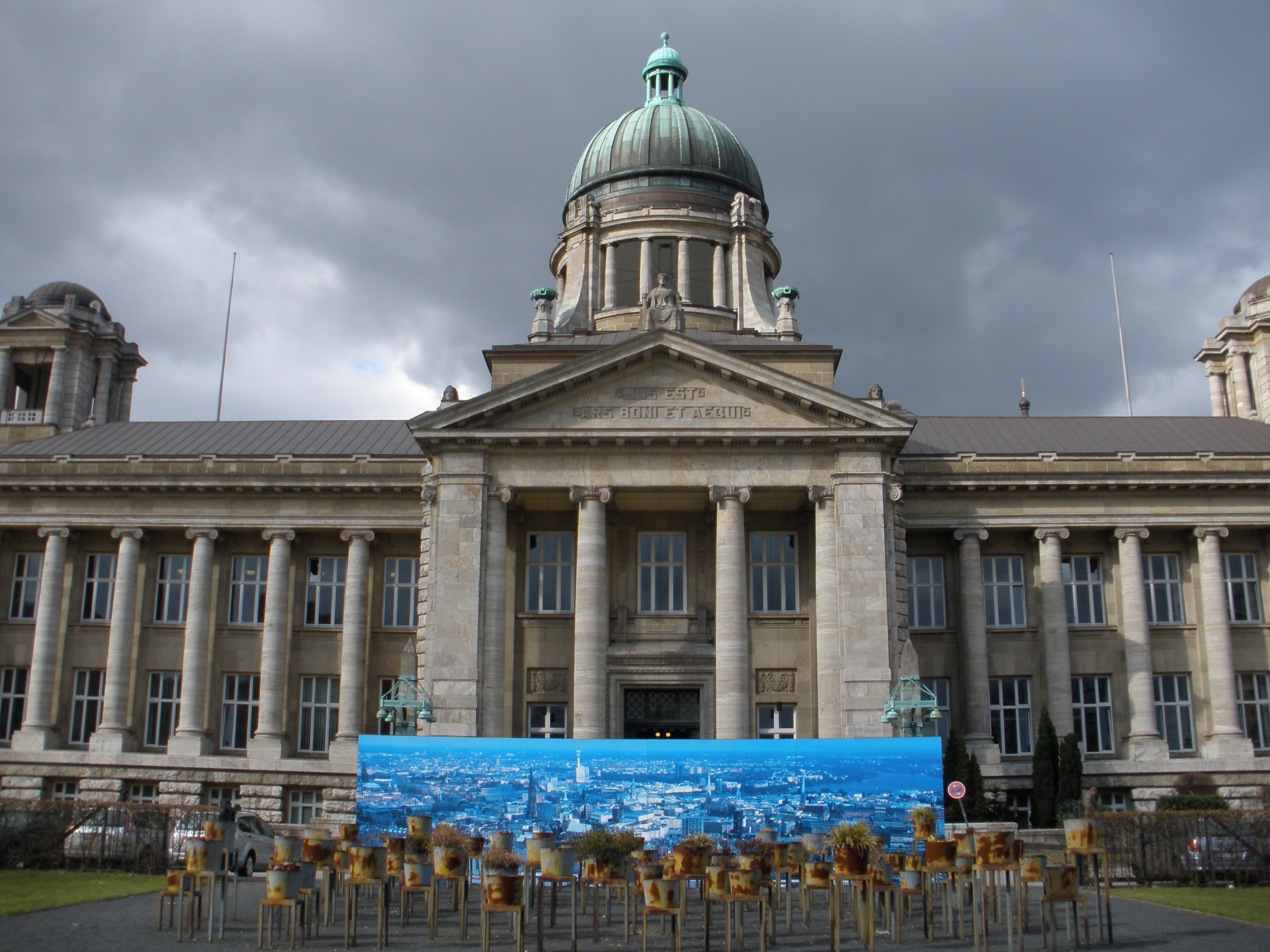
The monument Hier + Jetzt by Goria Friedman for all persons in the Nazi period who were sentenced to death by the Hamburg court and for the persons executed in the courtyard of the remand prison (Untersuchungsgefängnis am Holstenglacis)

France Bloch-Sérazin was born Françoise Bloch on 21 February 1913 in Paris to a French Jewish family. Bloch was the daughter of Marguerite Herzog (1886–1975), and the writer Jean-Richard Bloch. Through her mother, Bloch was the niece of the writer André Maurois.

France Bloch was initially a student in the countryside near Poitiers, France, where she obtained a degree in chemistry after having hesitated between chemistry, literature and philosophy. In October 1934, she began working at the laboratory of Professor Urbain at the Paris Institute of Chemistry (French: l'Institut de Chimie de Paris). In 1938, Bloch joined the Communist Party, becoming involved in the support of the Spanish Republicans who were fighting fascism there.

After the installation of the Vichy regime, Bloch was barred from her laboratory because she was a Jewish communist and had to work as a tutor in order to survive. In 1941, she participated in the first groups of the communist resistance led by Raymond Losserand and installed a small, rudimentary laboratory in her two-room apartment on the Place du Danube located in the 19th arrondissement in Paris. Taking the name Claudia in hiding, she worked with Colonel Dumont making grenades and detonators used in attacks organized by the youth resistance (called the Young Battalions) at the end of August 1941.

Bloch was arrested by the French police on 16 May 1942. After four months of interrogation and torture, she was condemned to death by a German military tribunal, along with 18 co-conspirators (who were all immediately executed). Meanwhile, Bloch herself was deported to Germany and imprisoned in a fortress at Lübeck. She was subjected to further torture there, and was decapitated by guillotine in Hamburg on 12 February 1943.

In her last letter to her husband before her execution, Bloch-Sérazin wrote: "I die for what we fought for, I fought; you know like me that I could not have acted other than I acted: we cannot change". Her husband would be executed in 1944.

On the site of the Hamburg prison, a plaque on the back wall of the detention center commemorates two members of the Resistance who were killed there. A translation of the inscription reads:

France Bloch-Sérazin, 21 February 1913 – 12 February 1943

Suzanne Masson, 10 July 1901 – 1 November 1943

These two French women were beheaded with a guillotine in this prison because of their resistance to National Socialist tyranny in occupied France.

== Personal life ==
In May 1939, Bloch married Frédéric "Frédo" Sérazin, a French metalworker, trade unionist, communist and French resistance fighter. Together they had one child, Roland Sérazin (1940–2020).

=== Bloch family ===
Bloch's husband, Frédo Sérazin was arrested in February 1940, under the Daladier government, imprisoned first at the Sisteron fortress in March 1940, then at Châteaubriant, and finally at the Voves camp. He was assassinated by the German militia or the Gestapo in 1944 in Saint-Etienne, France.

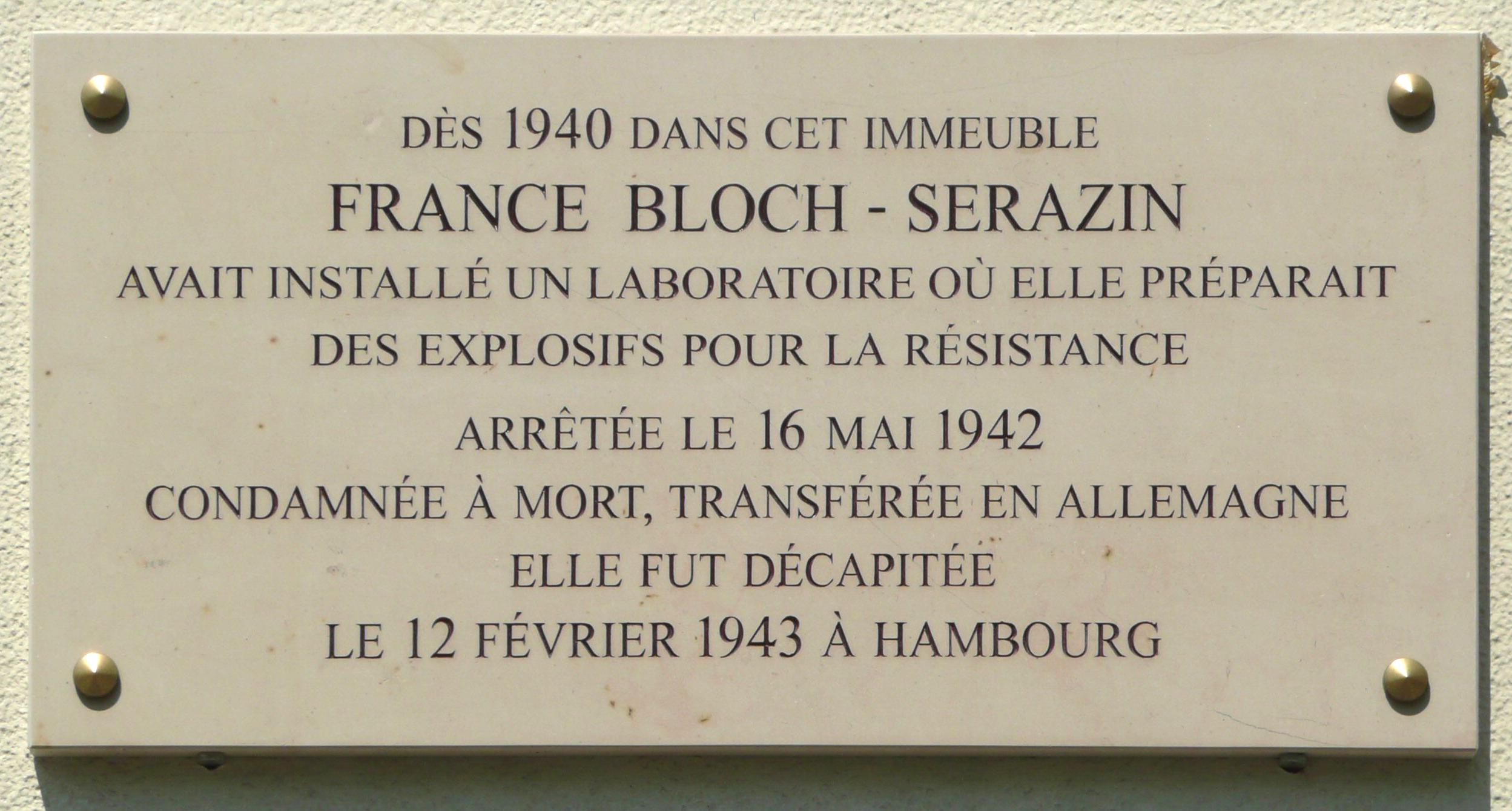
Plaque affixed on the facade of the building where France Bloch-Sérazin had installed her secret laboratory located 1 avenue Debidour in Paris 19th arrondissement (at the corner with the boulevard Sérurier).

Although Bloch's parents survived the Holocaust, her paternal grandmother, Louise Laure Marie Lévy Bloch (born Carling, near the France-German border on 15 June 1858), was almost 86 when she was arrested on 12 May 1944 by the Gestapo in a roundup in Néris-les-Bains. Louise Bloch was interned in Vichy. She was transferred on 26 May 1944 to the camp near Drancy and received registration number 23255. Despite her advanced age, she was reportedly a model of energy, confidence and strength. On 30 May 1944, she was deported to Auschwitz in convoy number 75. She died there 5 days later, on 4 June 1944. A plaque listing the deportees can be found at the Monument to the Dead in Néris-les-Bains, France; it bears her name.

== Honors ==
Posthumously, France Bloch-Sérazin was awarded the Legion of Honor, the Resistance Medal, and the War Cross.

A street was named after her in Blanc-Mesnil, Poitiers, Vierzon, as well as a square in Cognac.

== See also ==
- Marie-José Chombart de Lauwe
- Jeanne Bohec
- Marie-Claude Vaillant-Couturier
