= Vélodrome d'Hiver =

Indoor velodrom in Paris

Coordinates: 48.8538°N 2.2889°E

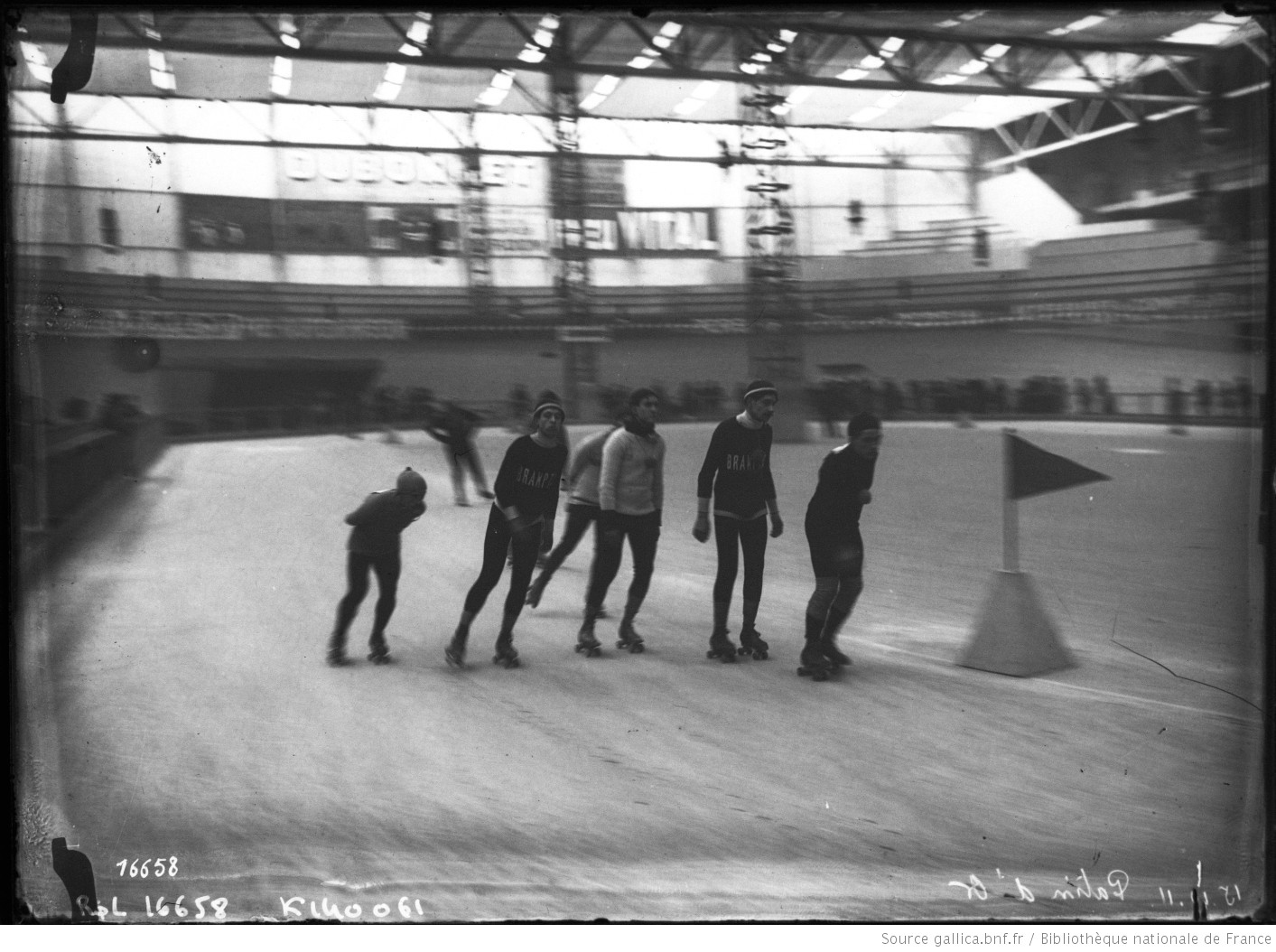
Photo of a 24-hour roller skating endurance competition held inside the Vélodrome d'Hiver in Paris in 1911

The Vélodrome d'Hiver (French pronunciation: [velɔdʁɔm divɛʁ], Winter Velodrome), colloquially Vel' d'Hiv', was an indoor bicycle racing cycle track and stadium (velodrome) on rue Nélaton, not far from the Eiffel Tower in Paris. As well as a cycling track, it was used for ice hockey, basketball, wrestling, boxing, roller-skating, circuses, bullfighting, spectaculars, and demonstrations. It was the first permanent indoor track in France and the name persisted for other indoor tracks built subsequently.

In July 1942, French police, acting under orders from the German authorities in Occupied Paris, used the velodrome to hold thousands of Jews and others who were victims in a mass arrest. The Jews were held at the velodrome before they were moved to a concentration camp in the Parisian suburbs at Drancy and then to the extermination camp at Auschwitz. The incident became known as the "Vel' d'Hiv roundup" (rafle du Vel' d'Hiv').

== Origins ==
The original track was housed in the Salles des Machines, the building used for the industrial display of the World's Fair, which ended in 1900. The building was unoccupied after the exhibition.

In 1902, the Salle des Machines was inspected by Henri Desgrange, who the following year inaugurated the Tour de France on behalf of the newspaper that he edited, L'Auto. With him were Victor Goddet, the newspaper's treasurer, an engineer named Durand, and an architect, Gaston Lambert. It was Lambert who said he could turn the hall into a sports arena with a track 333 metres long and eight metres wide. He finished it in 20 days.

The first meeting there, on 20 December 1903, had an audience of 20,000. They paid seven francs for the best view and a single franc to see hardly anything at all. The seating was primitive and there was no heating. The first event was not a cycle race but a walking competition over 250 metres. The first cycling competition was a race ridden behind pacing motorcycles. Only one rider—Cissac—managed to complete the 16 km (10 mi), the others having crashed on the unaccustomed steepness of the track banking.

== Change of name and track ==
In 1909 the Salle des Machines was listed for demolition to improve the view of the Eiffel Tower. Desgrange moved to another building nearby, at the corner of the boulevard de Grenelle and the rue Nélaton. The venue was named the Vélodrome d'Hiver. The new track, also designed by Lambert, was 253.16 m round at the base but exactly 250 m on the line ridden by the motor-paced riders (considered the stars of the day). Lambert built two tiers of seats, which towered above bankings so steep for their day that they were considered cliff-like. In the track centre, Lambert built a roller-skating rink of 2,700 square metres. He lit the whole lot with 1,253 hanging lamps.

There could be so many spectators jammed in the track centre for cycling events that they resembled passengers in the Paris métro in the rush hour. The richer and more knowledgeable spectators bought track-side seats and the rest crowded into the upper balcony from which the track looked a distant bowl. A rivalry grew between those in the top row and those below them, to the extent that those on high sometimes threw sausages, bread rolls and even bottles onto those below or, if they could throw that far, onto the track. The hall's managers had to install a net to catch the larger missiles.

== Six-days ==
Six-day cycle racing had started in London in the 19th century but became truly popular after changing to a race not for individuals but for teams of two. The new formula was created in America at Madison Square Garden. It became known in English as the madison and in French as l'américaine. The first such six-day race at the Vel' d'Hiv' started on 13 January 1913.

The riders included the Tour de France winners Louis Trousselier and Octave Lapize and other prominent riders such as Émile Georget. The race began at 6 pm and by 9 pm all 20,000 seats were sold. Among those who watched was the millionaire Henri de Rothschild, who offered a prize of 600 Fr, and the dancer Mistinguett, who offered 100 Fr. The winners were Goulet and Fogler, an American-Australian pairing.

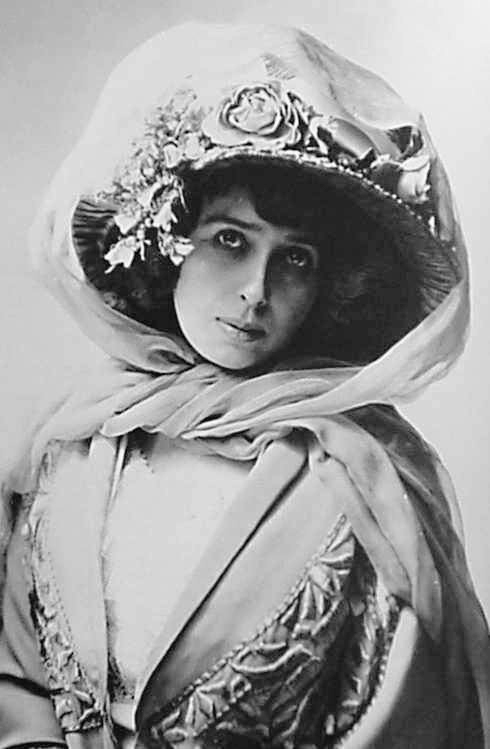
Singer and actress Mistinguett

The Franco-American writer René de Latour said: "I have known the time when it was considered quite a feat to get into the Vel' d'Hiv' during a six-day race. There were mounted police all round the block, barriers were erected some way from the building, and if you did not have a ticket or a pass to show, you were not allowed anywhere near the place. You can guess that the disappointed fans often produced a near-riot."

A tradition started in 1926 of electing a Queen of the Six, whose job included starting the race. Among them were Édith Piaf, Annie Cordy and the accordionist Yvette Horner, who also played from the roof of a car while preceding the Tour de France.

Races at the Vel' d'Hiv' were sometimes doubted for their genuineness. While the spectacle drew large and even capacity crowds, the best riders were rumoured to control the race. The French journalist Pierre Chany wrote:

There was a lot of talk about the relative honesty of the results, and journalists sometimes asked themselves what importance they ought to place on victories in these six-day races. The best of the field combined between themselves, it was known, to fight against other teams and to get their own hands on the biggest prizes, which they then shared between them. This coalition, cruelly nicknamed the Blue Train [after a luxury rail service patronised by the rich] imposed its rule and sometimes even the times of the race, the length of the rest periods. The little teams fought back on certain days but, generally, the law belonged to the cracks, better equipped physically and often better organised.

American writer Ernest Hemingway was a regular fan of six-day and other races at the Vel' d'Hiv' while he lived in Paris. He wrote:

I have started many stories about bicycle racing but have never written one that is as good as the races are both on the indoor and outdoor tracks and on the roads. But I will get the Vélodrome d’Hiver with the smoky light of the afternoon and the high-banked wooden track and the whirring sound the tires made on the wood as the riders passed, the effort and the tactics as the riders climbed and plunged, each one a part of his machine. ... I must write the strange world of the six-day races and the marvels of the road-racing in the mountains. French is the only language it has ever been written in properly and the terms are all French and that is what makes it hard to write.

== 1924 Summer Olympics ==
For the 1924 Summer Olympics, the velodrome hosted boxing, fencing, weightlifting, and wrestling events.

== Boxing ==
Boxing began at the Vel' d'Hiv' after a meeting between an American, Jeff Dickson, and Henri Desgrange, the track's main owner and leading promoter. Dickson arrived in France from Missouri in 1917 as a "sammie". Sammies, named after the owner of Metro-Goldwyn-Mayer, were cameramen sent from the U.S. to film American soldiers in World War I.

Dickson stayed on in France after the war and began promoting boxing in the Wagram area of Paris. He and Desgrange got on and the two agreed he should organise a first boxing tournament at the Vel' d'Hiv' in 1929. The main match pitted Milou Pladner against Frankie Genaro, bringing in 920,110 Fr.

== Wrestling ==
Professional wrestling in France was relaunched in the catch-as-catch-can style (renamed from "Lutte" to "Catch") at the Vel' d'Hiv' in 1933 by the Fédération Française de Catch Professionnel (FFCP), co-founded by former World Heavyweight Champion Henri Deglane and French rugby player Raoul Paoli.

== The Lion Hunt and other spectacles ==
Dickson joined the management of the Vel' d'Hiv'. In 1931 he renovated the building to allow other uses in the centre of the cycling track: he removed several pillars that blocked the view of some spectators, took up the roller-skating rink, laid an ice rink of 60 m by 30 m, and constructed a cover for the rink to allow its use for other activities. The building was rechristened the “Palais des Sports de Grenelle”, though its former name remained in use. Under Dickson, the Vel' d'Hiv' became home to the Français Volants ice hockey team. The rink also featured skating shows by Sonja Henie in 1953 and 1955 and Holiday on Ice (1950 to 1958).

His most spectacular venture was his greatest and most expensive flop. Dickson discovered from the newspaper Paris-Midi that the Schneider circus in Naples was auctioning 100 lions. Dickson bought the animals the same day, along with their cages and trailers, for 80,000 Fr. He constructed a stage set, acquired two sick camels abandoned by a circus at Maisons-Alfort, hired fire-eaters and employed 20 actors to dress as African explorers—all to stage a spectacle called The Lion Hunt.

The lions, however, arrived from Naples feeling tired and limp. Dickson assured reporters they needed only a meal and began importing dead animals from local abattoirs. Things didn't improve. On the first night of the show, all 100 lions were released into the arena but showed no signs of excitement, much less ferocity. Dickson ordered his "explorers" to fire into the air to wake them up. The air became bitter with cordite fumes but the lions did little more than stroll about and urinate on the scenery. Now convinced the animals were harmless, stagehands began beating them, at which children began to cry and parents shouted angry protests. The organizers withdrew the animals and moved to the next act of the show. Things went little better. The camels refused to walk in a line as in a desert caravan. And their attendants, who were unemployed black people recruited from the streets, stumbled in the sand under their unaccustomed stage clothing. The show's run was abandoned.

Dickson now had two camels and 100 lions that he no longer needed. An assistant tied the camels behind a car, led them to the Seine and abandoned them. There they were found by the police. Eventually Dickson rented the camels and lions to another circus for 10,000 Fr a week, only for the circus to fail and Dickson to be summoned to collect his animals. By now he was also being pursued by the Société protectrice des animaux for cruelty in abandoning the camels. The animals were finally sent to a zoo near Hamburg.

The venture ended with the loss of 700,000 Fr by the Vel' d'Hiv'.

Dickson returned to America in 1939 and died when his bomber was shot down at St-André-de-l'Eure on 14 July, France's national day, in 1943. He is buried in the American cemetery at Omaha Beach west of Caen, beneath the third cross in the front row.

=== Other spectacles ===
- Naissance d'une cité was organised by Jean-Richard Bloch on 18 October 1937 as part of the Exposition Internationale des Arts et Techniques dans la Vie Moderne.
- The Vélodrome d'Hiver was also the venue of the 1951 European basketball championship.

== Vel' d'Hiv roundup ==
The Vel' d'Hiv was available for hire to whoever wanted it. Among those who booked was Jacques Doriot who led the French Popular Party, France's largest fascist party. It was at the Vel' d'Hiv, among other venues, that Doriot, with his Hitler-like salute, roused crowds to join his cause.

In 1940, Nazi Germany invaded France and occupied its northern half, including Paris. On 7 June 1942, they completed plans for Opération Vent printanier ("Operation Spring Breeze") to arrest 28,000 Jews using 9,000 French policemen. Arrests started early on 16 July and were complete by the next day. Among those who helped in the round-up were 3,400 young members of Doriot's PPF.

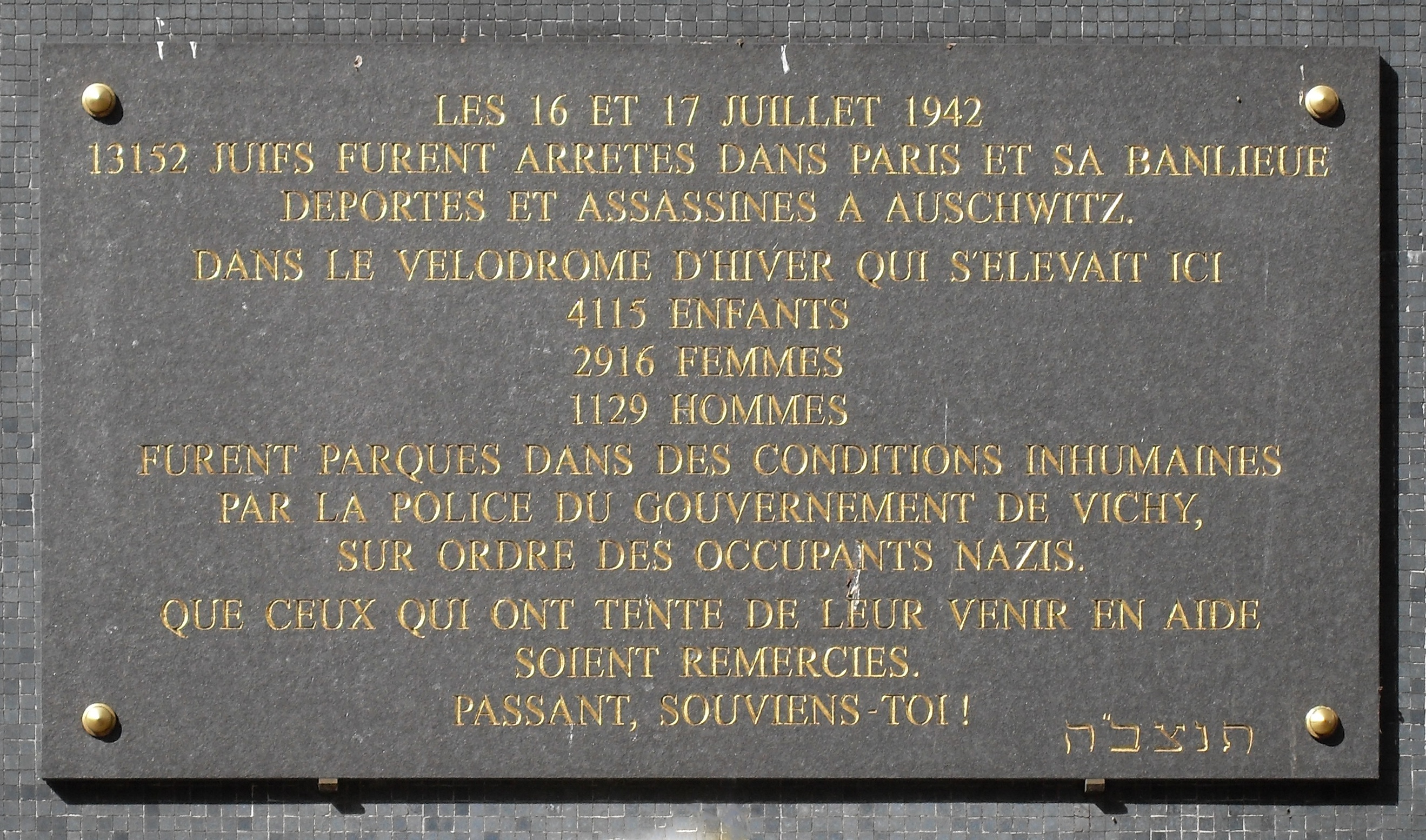
Commemorative plaque to the victims held in the Vel' d'Hiv' after the 16–17 July 1942 roundup of Jews in Paris.

Needing a place to hold the detainees, the Germans demanded the keys of the Vel' d'Hiv' from its owner, Jacques Goddet, who had taken over from his father Victor and from Henri Desgrange. The circumstances in which Goddet surrendered the keys remain a mystery, and the episode occupies only a few lines in his autobiography.

The Vel' d'Hiv had a glass roof, which had been painted dark blue to help avoid attracting bomber navigators. The dark glass roof, combined with windows screwed shut for security, raised the temperature inside the structure. The 13,152 people held there had no lavatories; of the 10 available, five were sealed because their windows offered a way out, and the others were blocked. The arrested Jews were kept there for five days with only water and food brought by Quakers, the Red Cross and the few doctors and nurses allowed to enter.

Those arrested were sent to an internment camp in half-completed tower blocks at Drancy and then to the extermination camp at Auschwitz. Only 400 survived.

== Post-war track encounter ==
An enthusiast, John Aulton, described the track in the first years after the war. He visited Paris on a tour organised for English schoolchildren who slept in tents in the grounds of a lycée. He was alone in wanting to see the Vélodrome d'Hiver. He wrote:

I set out on my Raleigh Sports. ... I arrived elated and full of anticipation but my joy was short-lived, all the doors were locked and barred and there was no sign of life. Without warning a side door flew open and a small powerfully built man came hurtling out of the gloom into the sunlight. A flapping empty sleeve hung where his right arm should have been. He poured a tirade of French at me before stepping back inside and slamming the door. I gave the door another swift kick and shouted in English that all I wanted was to see the famous track. The door slowly opened and the one-armed man stepped outside, but this time a broad smile covered his previously angry face. "Anglais?" he said, as if uttering some special password. He spoke in halting English. Did I know Wembley? He had ridden the London six-day there? He put his one good arm around my shoulder and escorted me and my Raleigh into the stadium.

The old track was looking the worse for wear. There was dust everywhere and the shafts of sunlight that penetrated the dirty blue skylights picked out the particles dancing in the air. I walked over to the banking and touched the boards that had seen so much drama. Suddenly and without explanation a feeling of fear and revulsion came over me; I grabbed my bike and ran as fast as I could into the outside world. The door would not open at first but a panic-stricken tug freed it and I dashed out into the heat of a Parisian afternoon and pedalled away not caring in which direction just so long as I could get away from the Vélodrome d'Hiver.

== Final events ==
The last six-day race at the Vel' d'Hiv' started on 7 November 1958. The stars were Roger Rivière, Jacques Anquetil, Fausto Coppi and André Darrigade. The race was run with teams of three. Rivière had to drop out after a crash with Anquetil in the first hours; on 12 November, Darrigade won the biggest prime, or intermediate prize, ever offered at the track: one million francs. The overall winners were Anquetil and his partners, Darrigade and Terruzzi. The building had grown old, dirty and dusty and leaked when it rained. Electricity cables hung in loops.

The final night at the Vel' d'Hiv' was 12 May 1959, featuring the painter Salvador Dalí. Among his stage props was a model of the Eiffel Tower, which he exploded to symbolise the end of the exhibition hall in which he stood. A fire destroyed part of the Vélodrome d'Hiver in 1959 and the rest of the structure was demolished. A block of flats and a building belonging to the Ministry of the Interior now stand on the site.

== Government apology ==
For decades the French government declined to apologize for the role of French policemen in the round-up or for any other state complicity. It was argued (by de Gaulle and others) that the French Republic had been dismantled when Philippe Pétain instituted a new French State during the war and that the Republic had been re-established after the war had ended. It was not for the Republic, therefore, to apologise for events that happened while it had not existed and which had been carried out by a state which it did not recognise. For example, former President François Mitterrand had maintained this position. The claim was more recently reiterated by Marine Le Pen, leader of the National Front Party, during the 2017 election campaign.

On 16 July 1995, President Jacques Chirac stated that it was time that France faced up to its past and he acknowledged the role that the state had played in the persecution of Jews and other victims of the German occupation. Those responsible for the round-up, according to Chirac, were "450 policiers et gendarmes français, sous l'autorité de leurs chefs, répondaient aux exigences des nazis" ("450 policemen and gendarmes, French, under the authority of their leaders [who] obeyed the demands of the Nazis").

To mark the 70th anniversary of the round-up, President François Hollande gave a speech at a monument of the Vel' d'Hiv' round-up on 22 July 2012. The president recognized that this event was a crime committed "in France, by France," and emphasized that the deportations in which French police participated were offences committed against French values, principles, and ideals. He continued his speech by remarking that the Republic would clamp down on anti-Semitism "with the greatest determination".

The first official admission that the French State had been complicit in the deportation of 76,000 Jews during WW II was made in 1995 by President Jacques Chirac, at the site of the Vélodrome d'Hiver where 13,000 Jews had been rounded up for deportation to death camps in July 1942. "La France, ce jour-là, accomplissait l'irréparable. Manquant à sa parole, elle livrait ses protégés à leurs bourreaux," he said ("France, on that day [16 July 1942], committed the irreparable. Breaking its word, it handed those who were under its protection over to their executioners"). "La folie criminelle de l'occupant a été secondée par des Français, par l'Etat français" ("the criminal folly of the occupiers was seconded by the French, by the French state").

On 16 July 2017, also at a ceremony at the Vel' d'Hiv' site, President Emmanuel Macron denounced the historical revisionism that denied France's responsibility for the 1942 round-up and subsequent deportation of 13,000 Jews. "It was indeed France that organised this", Macron insisted, French police collaborating with the Nazis. “Not a single German” was directly involved, he said, but French police collaborating with the Nazis. Macron was even more specific than Chirac had been in stating that the Government during the War was certainly that of France. “It is convenient to see the Vichy regime as born of nothingness, returned to nothingness. Yes, it’s convenient, but it is false. We cannot build pride upon a lie,” he said. Macron made a subtle reference to Chirac's remark when he added, "I say it again here. It was indeed France that organized the round-up, the deportation, and thus, for almost all, death."

A plaque marking the Rafle du Vel' d'Hiv' was placed on the track building after the War and moved to 8 boulevard de Grenelle in 1959. On 3 February 1993, President Mitterrand commissioned a monument to be erected on the site. It stands now on a curved base, to represent the cycle track, on the edge of the quai de Grenelle. It is the work of the sculptor Walter Spitzer and the architect Mario Azagury. Spitzer and his family were survivors of deportation to Auschwitz. The statues represent all deportees but especially those of the Vel' d'Hiv'. The sculptures include children, a pregnant woman and a sick man. The words on the Mitterrand-era monument still differentiate between the French Republic and the Vichy Government that ruled during WW II, so they do not accept responsibility for the roundup of the Jews. The words are in French: "La République française en hommage aux victimes des persécutions racistes et antisémites et des crimes contre l’humanité commis sous l’autorité de fait dite ‘gouvernement de l’État français’ (1940–1944) N’oublions jamais", which translate as follows: "The French Republic pays homage to the victims of racist and anti-Semitic persecutions and crimes against humanity committed under the de facto authority called the 'Government of the French State' 1940–1944. Let us never forget." The monument was inaugurated on 17 July 1994. A ceremony is held at the monument every year in July.

== Popular culture ==
The Vélodrome d'Hiver is featured in the 2006 novel Sarah's Key by Tatiana de Rosnay and in the 2010 film Sarah's Key based on the novel, as well as the French film The Round Up.

== See also ==
- List of cycling tracks and velodromes

Preceded by 1949 Final Venue; Cairo	Eurobasket; Final Venue; 1951	Succeeded by 1953 Final Venue; Moscow
