= Charles Dobzynski =

French poet, journalist and translator

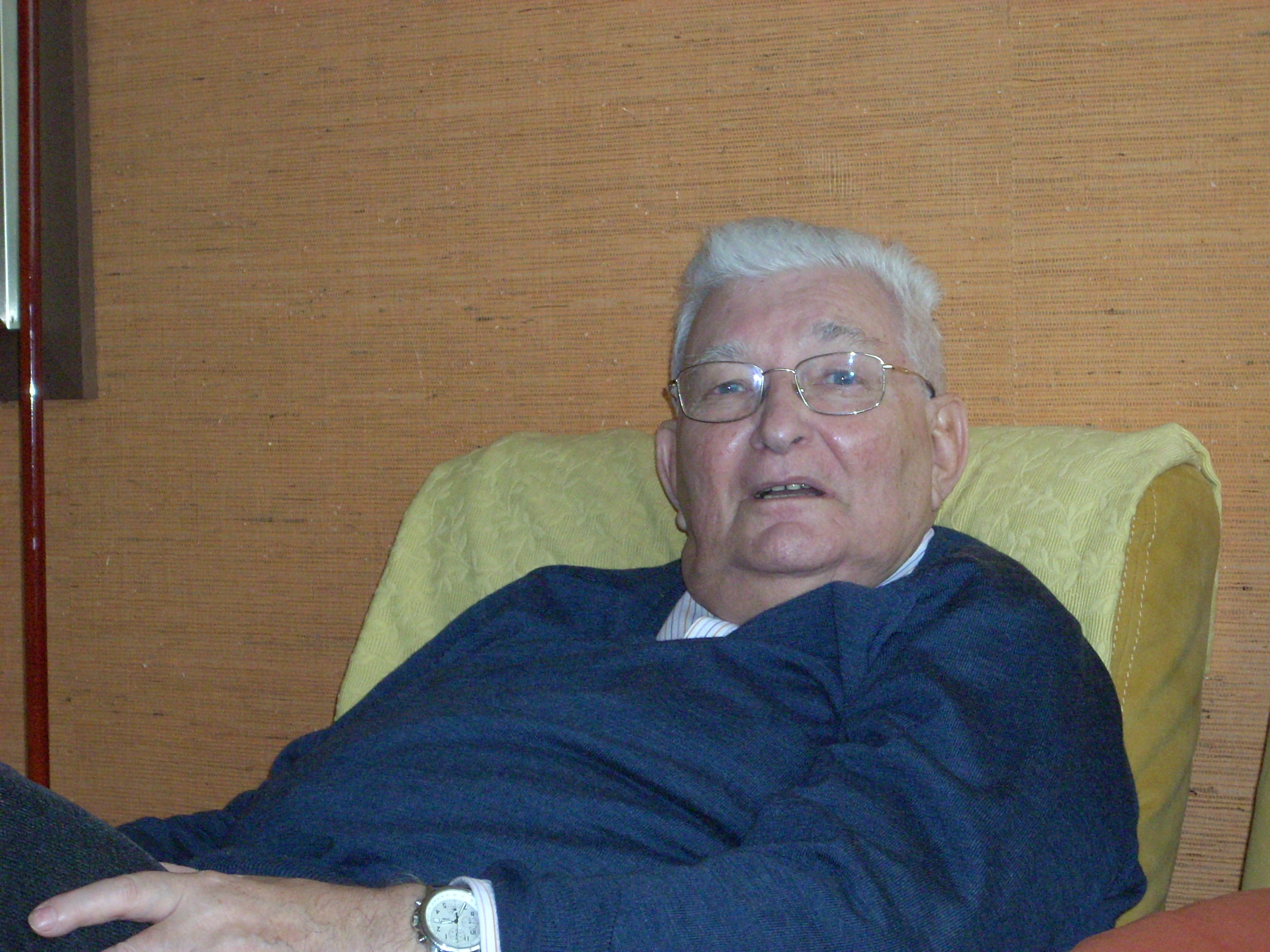
Charles Dobzynski

Charles Dobzynski (April 8, 1929 Warsaw - 26 September 2014) was a French poet, journalist and translator.

== Life ==
His family emigrated to France, where he was barely a year old. He narrowly escaped deportation during World War II. he published his first poem in 1944, in a youth newspaper of the Resistance. In 1949, Paul Eluard presented his first poems in Les Lettres françaises. On the proposal of Aragon, he entered the newspaper's editors Ce Soir. He was a journalist and film critic. He was an editor of the magazine Europe, with Pierre Abraham, and Pierre Gamarra.

He is Chevalier of Arts and Letters, a member of the Académie Mallarmé, and president of the jury for the Apollinaire prize.

== Awards ==
- 2005 Prix Goncourt de la Poésie

== Works ==
=== English Translations ===
- Benjamin Fondane. Librairie Droz. 1998. ISBN 978-2-600-03510-1.

=== Bibliography ===
- Notre amour est pour demain - Seghers, 1951
- Au clair de l’amour - Seghers, 1955
- D’une voix commune - Seghers, 1962
- L’Opéra de l’espace - Gallimard, 1963
- Capital terrestre - E.F.R.
- Un Cantique pour Massada - Europe poésie, 1976
- Arbre d’identité, Rougerie, 1976
- Callifictions - 1977
- Table des éléments - Belfond, 1978
- Délogiques - Belfond, 1981
- Une vie de ventrilogue - 1981
- 40 polars en miniature - Rougerie 1983
- Liturgie profane - Le Verbe et l'empreinte 1983
- La vie est un orchestre - Belfond, 1988, Prix Max Jacob 1992
- Alphabase Rougerie, 1992
- Fable chine - Rougerie, 1996
- Géode - éd. Phi, 1998
- Les choses n'en font qu'à leur tête. Illustrator Daniel Nadaud. Cadex éditions. 1998. ISBN 978-2-905910-98-1.
- Journal alternatif, Bernard Dumerchez, 2000
- Les Heures de Moscou - Europe/Poésie
- L'Escalier des Questions - L'Amourier, 2003
- Corps à réinventer - éd. de la Différence, 2005
- La Réalité d'à côté - éd. L'Amourier, 2005
- La Scène primitive, novel - éd. de La Différence, 2006 (ISBN 9782729116)
- A revoir, la mémoire - éd. Phi 2006
- Gestuaire des sports - éd. Le Temps des cerises, 2006 (ISBN 978-2-84109-609-1)
- Solène et le cyborg. Editions Publibook. ISBN 978-2-7483-5067-8.
