= Naissance d'une cité =

Naissance d'une cité was a "popular spectacle" held at the Vélodrome d'hiver on 18 October 1937 as part of the Exposition Internationale des Arts et Techniques dans la Vie Moderne. The auteur for the event was Jean-Richard Bloch.

The spectacle was based around the story of an oil-rich colony led by an engineer which was threatened by an imperialist power. However, following the intervention of the League of Nations, there was a decision to pool the world's resource and an era of endless peace was ushered in. The drama unrolled to the sound of horns and sirens, radio news flashes and during the finale not only were there wrestling matches and athletic events, but the cycle track of the Vélodrome d'hiver was used for a cycle race. There was a chorus — achieved by amplifying the voice of radio announcer, but original plans to project a film onto a big screen were dropped, in favour of an enormous backdrop designed by Fernand Léger. A copy of this backdrop, entitled La Naissance d'une cité, was dedicated by Léger to Jean-Richard Bloch. It fetched €93,600 when auctioned at Christie's in 2005.

The score included contributions from Arthur Honegger, Darius Milhaud and Jean Wiener.

The plot was adjusted to fit the publicised optimism of the sponsors, the French Popular Front government. The story concerned a group of workers trapped in a monotonous job who plan to set up a utopian community on an Island in the Atlantic Ocean.

In 2006 the Groupe Études Jean-Richard Bloch republished the book, Naissance d'une cité, related to the original show.
