= Europe (magazine) =

French literary magazine

- Editor-in-chief: Jean-Baptiste Para
- Former editors: Charles Dobzynski, Pierre Gamarra, Pierre Abraham, Louis Aragon, Jean Cassou, Jean Guéhenno, René Arcos.
- Categories: Literary journal
- Frequency: Monthly
- Founder: Romain Rolland and friends
- Founded: 1923; 103 years ago
- Country: France
- Based in: Paris
- Language: French
- Website: www.europe-revue.net
- ISSN: 0014-2751
- OCLC: 1933600

Europe (French pronunciation: [ø.ʁɔp]) is a French literary magazine founded in 1923.

== History ==
Created by Romain Rolland and a group of French writers, the literary magazine Europe began on 15 February 1923, published by Rieder House.

In the journal's first issue, its editor-in-chief, René Arcos, explained the choice of "Europe" as a title: "We speak of Europe because our vast peninsula, between the East and the New World, is the crossroads where civilisations meet. But it is to all the peoples that we address ourselves [...] in the hope of averting the tragic misunderstandings which currently divide mankind."
Jean Guéhenno was the next chief editor, from 1929 until 1936, followed by Jean Cassou from May 1936 until 1939.

Until 1939, when it was suspended on the announcement of the Molotov–Ribbentrop Pact, Europe followed the Communists in the anti-fascist struggle. In 1946, Europe was revived due to the efforts of Louis Aragon, who published it through La Bibliothèque française, merged in 1949 into the publishing company Les Éditeurs français réunis. Pierre Abraham then became its director, which he was until his death in 1974. Pierre Gamarra succeeded him, having acted as editor-in-chief since 1951. From 2009 until 2014, Charles Dobzynski was director while Jean-Baptiste Para remained editor-in-chief of the magazine.

Since the 1950s, Europe has issued thematic titles considered as a reference work. It also contains book and cultural reviews and publishes poetry or fiction. Europe has published works by authors as diverse as Aragon, Jean-Richard Bloch, Louis-Ferdinand Céline, Emile Danoën, Jean Giono, Panaït Istrati, Rabindranath Tagore or Tristan Tzara, for example.

There is an Association of Europe Friends (Association des Amis d'Europe), which aims to develop cultural life, principally of the literary kind, "in a spirit of openness and hospitality and in the humanistic tradition which has characterised Europe since its foundation."

== Sources ==
In French

- Europe, une revue de culture internationale, 1923–1998. Colloquium of 27 March 1998, salle Louis Liard, at the Sorbonne.
- Stavroula Constantopoulou, La Fonction de la littérature et le rôle de l'écrivain selon la revue Europe de 1923 à 1939, doctoral thesis under the supervision of Henri Béhar, submitted at Paris III on 19 December 1996, 585 pp.
- Philippe Niogret, La revue Europe et les romans français de l'entre-deux-guerres (1923–1939), L'Harmattan, 2004.

== See also ==
- Pierre Gamarra, chief editor (1951–1974) and director (1974–2009) of Europe
- Abbaye de Créteil, the group of writers to which belonged the first editorial team in 1923
