= Pierre Gamarra =

French poet, novelist and literary critic

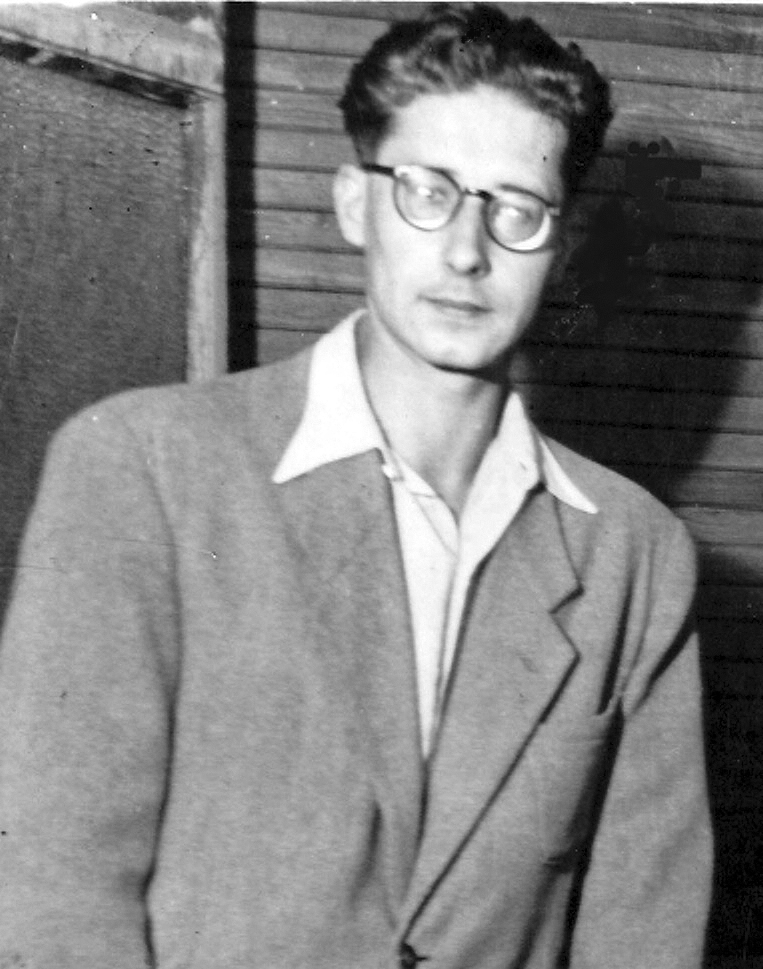
- Gamarra in Toulouse, 1945
- Born: Pierre Albert Gamarra; 10 July 1919; Toulouse, France
- Died: 20 May 2009 (aged 89); Argenteuil, France
- Occupation: Writer
- Writing career
- Genres: Novel, Children's literature, Fable, Poetry, Essay
- Subjects: Toulouse, Midi-Pyrénées
- Notable works: La Maison de feu (1948); Le Maître d'école (1955); La Mandarine et le Mandarin (1970); Mon cartable
- Notable awards: Hélène Vacaresco Prize for Poetry 1943; National Council of the Resistance Prize 1944; Veillon International Grand Prize for the Novel 1948; Literature for the Youth Prize 1961; SGDL Grand Prize for the Novel 1985
- Website: pierregamarra.com

Signature
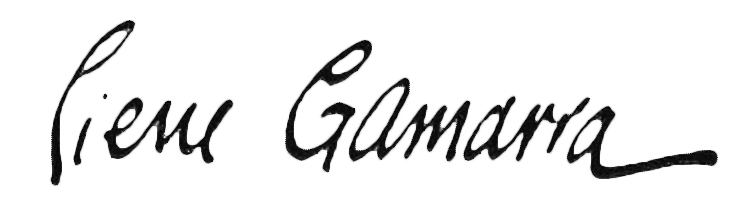

Pierre Gamarra (French pronunciation: [pjɛʁ gamaˈʁa]; 10 July 1919 – 20 May 2009) was a French poet, novelist and literary critic, a long-time chief editor and director of the literary magazine Europe.
Gamarra is best known for his poems and novels for the youth and for narrative and poetical works deeply rooted in his native region of Midi-Pyrénées.

== Life ==
Pierre Gamarra was born in Toulouse on 10 July 1919. From 1938 until 1940, he was a teacher in the South of France. During the German Occupation, he joined various Resistance groups in Toulouse, involved in the writing and distributing of clandestine publications. This led him to a career as a journalist, and then, more specifically both as a writer and a literary journalist.

In 1948, Pierre Gamarra received the first Charles-Veillon International Grand Prize in Lausanne for his first novel, La Maison de feu. (Note: La Maison de feu means "The fiery house". The novel takes place in Toulouse during the 1930s.) Members of the 1948 Veillon Prize jury included writers André Chamson, Vercors, Franz Hellens and Louis Guilloux. (Note: Gathered in La Tour-de-Peilz, the jury also included Léon Bopp, Maurice Zermatten, Charles Guyot, Louis Martin-Chauffier and Robert Vivier.) The novel is described in Books Abroad as "a beautifully written tale of humble life, which Philippe and Jammes would have liked".

From 1945 to 1951, he worked as a journalist in Toulouse. In 1951, Louis Aragon, Jean Cassou and André Chamson offered him a position in Paris as editor-in-chief of the literary magazine Europe. He occupied this position until 1974, when he became director of the magazine. Under Pierre Gamarra's direction, Europe continued the project initiated in 1923 by Romain Rolland and other writers. (Note: For instance, many issues were devoted to an extensive presentation of countries whose literature is not internationally very well known.) Until 2009, Pierre Gamarra also contributed to most of the magazines's issues with a book review column titled "La Machine à écrire" (The Typewriter). (Note: In French La Machine à écrire; since 2009, the column is continued in Europe by Jacques Lèbre.)

Most of his novels take place in his native South-West of France: he wrote a novel trilogy based on the history of Toulouse and various novels set in that town, along the Garonne or in the Pyrenees.
John L. Brown, in World Literature Today, writes that Pierre Gamarra's descriptions of Toulouse, its people and its region were "masterly", "skillfully and poetically" composed "with a vibrant lyricism" and that:

Few contemporary French novelists can communicate a feeling for place, melding poetry and realism, myth and history, more movingly and convincingly than Pierre Gamarra.

Pierre Gamarra is also the author of The Midnight Roosters, (Note: In French Les Coqs de Minuit.) a novel set in Aveyron during the French Revolution. The book was adapted for the French television channel FR3 in 1973. The film, casting Claude Brosset, was shot in the town of Najac.

In 1955, he published one of his best known novels, Le Maître d'école; (Note: French for The Schoolmaster.) the book and its sequel La Femme de Simon (Note: French for Simon's wife, Simon being Simon Sermet, the main character in both novels.) (1962) received critical praise.
Reviewing his 1957 short stories collection Les Amours du potier, (Note: French for A Potter's lovers.) Lois Marie Sutton deems that, although war affects the plots of many of "all (those) delightful thirteen stories", "it is the light-hearted plot that Gamarra maneuvers best" and that "as in his previous publications, (the author) shows himself to be a master delineator of the life of the average peasant and employee."

In 1961, Pierre Gamarra received the Prix Jeunesse for L'Aventure du Serpent à Plumes (Note: L'Aventure du Serpent à Plumes, French for "The Adventure of the Feathered Snake", is a novel for the youth.) and in 1985, the SGDL Grand Prize (Note: In French, Grand Prix de la Société des gens de lettres pour le roman.) for his novel Le Fleuve Palimpseste. (Note: Le Fleuve palimpseste, French for "The Palimpsest river". The river is the Garonne.)

Pierre Gamarra died in Argenteuil on 20 May 2009, leaving a substantial body of work, not yet translated into English for the most part. The Encyclopædia Britannica sees in him a "delightful practitioner with notable drollery and high technical skills" in the art of children's poetry and children's stories. His poems (Note: Pierre Gamarra's best known poems include Mon cartable (My schoolbag), My School and The Clock.) and fables (Note: His best known fables include The Cosmonaut and his host, The Apple, The Ski, The mocked Mocker (Le Moqueur moqué) or The Fly and the Cream.) are well known by French schoolchildren.

== Selection of works ==
In French unless otherwise stated

=== Literature for the youth ===
==== Stories ====
- Les Vacances de tonton 36 (2006)
- Moustache et ses amis de toutes les couleurs (2005)

ISBN 2-7479-0084-3

New edition of Moustache et ses amis (1974)

- Douze tonnes de diamant (1978) ISBN 2-7047-0302-7
- L'Aventure du Serpent à plumes, Prize for the Youth 1961
- Berlurette trilogy:
  - Berlurette contre Tour Eiffel (1961)
  - Le Trésor de Tricoire (1959)
  - Le Mystère de la Berlurette (1957)
- La Rose des Karpathes, (1955)

In English

- The Bridge on the River Clarinette in Cricket: the magazine for children, vol. 2 No. 11, (La Salle, Illinois) 1975, (p. 22-29) – illustrated by Marilyn Hafner, translated by Paulette Henderson
- Meet your author (op. cit. pp. 30–33), tr. Paulette Henderson

==== Fables collections ====
- Salut, Monsieur de La Fontaine (2005), ill. Frédéric Devienne, ISBN 2-916237-00-3
- La Mandarine et le Mandarin (1970)

==== Poetry ====
- Mon cartable et autres poèmes à réciter (2006) ISBN 2747901122
- Des mots pour une maman (1984) ISBN 2-7082-2379-8
- Voici des maisons (1979) ISBN 2-7047-0117-2
- Les Mots enchantés (1952)

In English

- 'My schoolbag', in Berthe Mouchette Celebration, Melbourne Alliance française (2019), p. 74-75

==== CD ====
- Les Aventuriers de l'alphabet (2002) ISBN 2-7404-1278-9

==== Adaptations ====
- Les Fariboles de Bolla (1981), La Farandole, original Swedish text and ill. by Gunilla Bergström, ISBN 2-7047-0232-2

=== Novels ===
- L'Empreinte de l'ours (2010), De Borée (Sayat) ISBN 9782844949899
- Les Coqs de minuit (new ed. including Rosalie Brousse) 2009, De Borée ISBN 9782844949097
- Le Maître d'école (new ed. including La Femme de Simon) 2008, De Borée ISBN 9782812903007
- Les Lèvres de l'été (1986) ISBN 2-209-05808-2
- Le Fleuve palimpseste PUF (1985) ISBN 9782130385868; SGDL Prize for the novel
- Cantilène occitane (1979) ISBN 9782070385027
- La Femme et le Fleuve (Note: French for The Woman and the River. The river is, again, the Garonne.) (1952)
- L'assassin a le prix Goncourt (Note: L'assassin a le prix Goncourt (French for 'The Murderer receives the Goncourt Prize') is set in Moissac.) (1951)
- Les Enfants du pain noir (1950) ISBN 9782812908491
- La Maison de feu (1948), Éditions La Baconnière (Neuchâtel)/Éditions de Minuit, Charles Veillon International Prize

Reedited De Borée (2014) ISBN 9782812911491
Editions of the book since 1948

- Toulouse trilogy:
  - 72 soleils, 1975 ISBN 9782201013522
  - L'Or et le Sang, 1970
  - Les Mystères de Toulouse, 1967

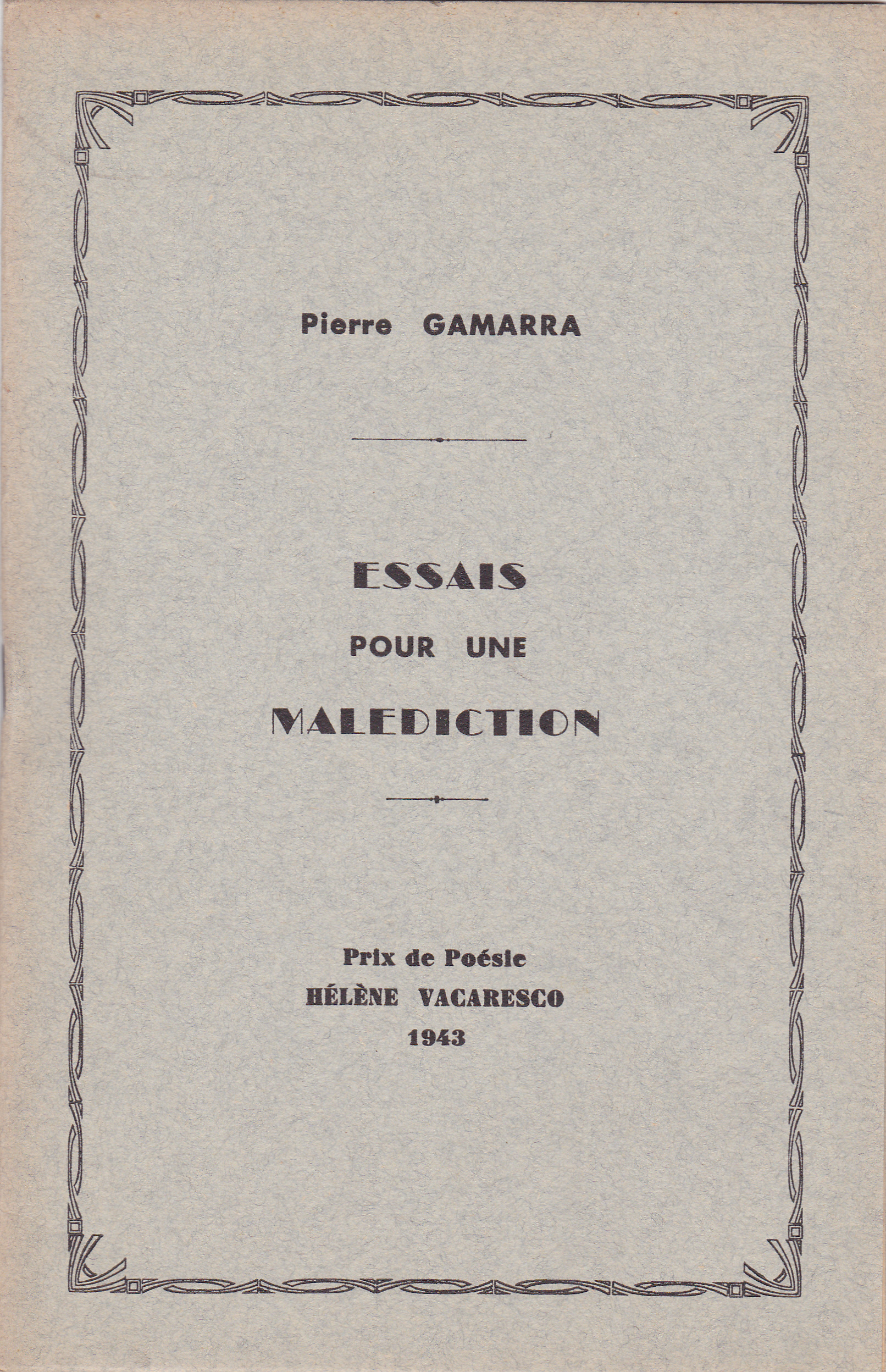
Book cover of Pierre Gamarra's poetry collection Essais pour une malédiction (1943), Hélène Vascaresco Prize for Poetry

=== Short stories ===
- Les Amours du potier, Éditions La Baconnière (Neuchâtel), 1957
- Un cadavre; Mange ta soupe, Prix National de la Résistance 1944

=== Poetry collections ===
- Mon Pays l'Occitanie (2009), Cahiers de la Lomagne
- Romances de Garonne (1990) ISBN 9782209063390
- Essais pour une malédiction, Hélène Vacaresco Prize for Poetry 1943

== About Pierre Gamarra ==
In French unless otherwise stated

=== Book reviews in English ===
- List of reviews of Pierre Gamarra's books (Worldcat)including:
  - Les Lèvres de l'été reviewed by John L. Brown, World Literature Today, Vol. 61, No. 2, The Diary as Art (Spring, 1987), p. 236 (University of Oklahoma)
  - La Maison de feu reviewed by Georgette R. Schuler, Books Abroad, Vol. 23, No. 2 (Spring, 1949), p. 156

=== Literary journals special issues ===
- Poésie Première "Tarn en Poésie 2003: Avec Pierre Gamarra"
- Poésie Première No. 29 (2004)

=== Interviews ===
- Tohoku University Faculty of Letters Bulletin, No. 27 (Year 2007) (Sendai, Japan)
- Vivre en Val-D'Oise, No. 112, November–December 2008 (Argenteuil)

=== Homages ===
- Charles Dobzynski, Michel Delon, Jean Métellus, Roger Bordier, Béatrice Didier, Raymond Jean, Bernard Chambaz, Michel Besnier, Marc Petit, Claude Sicard, Georges-Emmanuel Clancier, Henri Béhar, Gérard Noiret, Francis Combes, in Europe No. 966 (October 2009)
- Les Cahiers de la Lomagne (Los Quasèrns de la Lomanha), No. 15 (Year 2009), pp. 1 & 16-29

Two streets (one in Argenteuil, one in Montauban) and a cul-de-sac in Boulazac—, two schools (one in Montauban, the other in Bessens)— and two public libraries (one in Argenteuil, the other in Andrest) are named after Pierre Gamarra.

== See also ==
- Europe (magazine)

== External resources ==
- Encyclopædia Britannica about Pierre Gamarra
- Pierre Gamarra at IMDb

In French

- Encyclopædia Universalis article
- Pierre Gamarra in the Dictionary of the workers' movement
- Pierre Gamarra on the website of Printemps des Poètes
