= Jenny de Vasson =

French photographer (1872–1920)

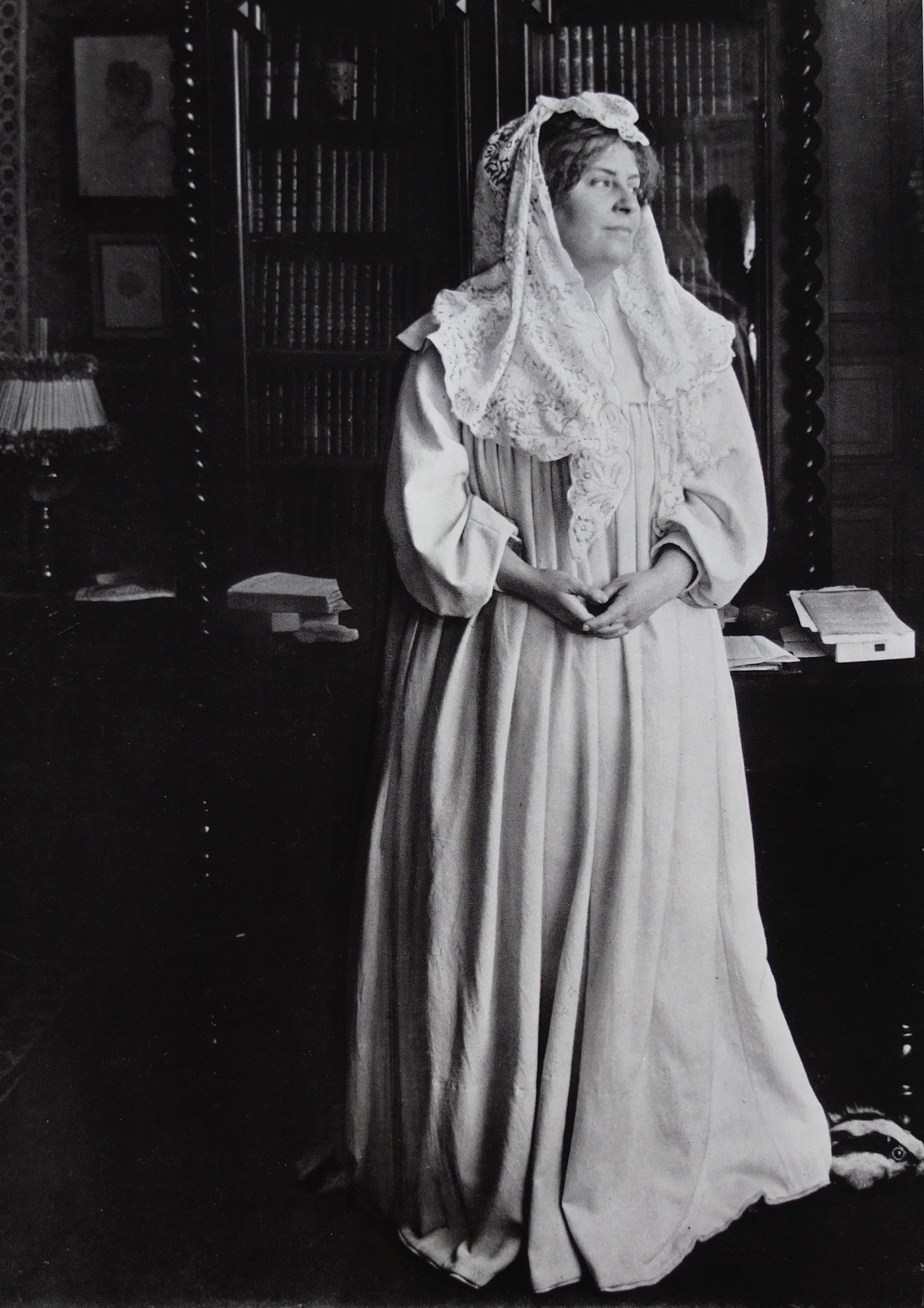
Self-portrait (c. 1910)

Jenny Marie Nannecy Girard de Vasson (20 August 1872 - 15 February 1920, Fougerolles) was one of the first notable women photographers in France. During her relatively brief career, she created over 5,000 images.

== Biography ==
Jenny Marie Nannecy Girard de Vasson was born on 20 August 1872 in La Châtre. The Girard de Vassons were an upper-class family, originally from Berry, with a liberal outlook. Her father was a magistrate, and several creative artists were among her parents' friends, including the author, George Sand. Initially, de Vasson studied drawing, with the painter, Bernard Naudin, who would remain a lifelong friend, although art never became more than a hobby. She first developed an interest in photography in 1899, and set up a small laboratory at home. During the following years, she travelled extensively, throughout France and Europe, returning from each trip with a large collection of photographs.

Following the onset of World War I, she and her family retired to Berry, where she focused on photographing the rural villagers. Photography was always treated as a pleasurable passion, for her friends and family, rather than a conscious artistic process. She died, unmarried, at the age of forty-seven, from a heart condition.

In her will, she requested that all her writings, drawings, and everything that could be linked to an artistic activity, be destroyed after her death. She omitted to mention her photographs, because she considered them to be memories, not creative works. A large number were destroyed, however, during World War II, when her parents' home in Versailles was looted.

The ones that survived, approximately 5,000 glass plates, albums and prints, were stored in cupboards at the family home in Fougerolles, which was once part of the Abbey of Varennes. They were discovered in the early 1980s by the photographer, Jean-Marc Zaorski, while he was working in Berry. He and three co-authors promoted her work in the book, Jenny de Vasson, une femme photographe au début du siècle, published in 1982 by Éditions Herscher.

== Selected works ==
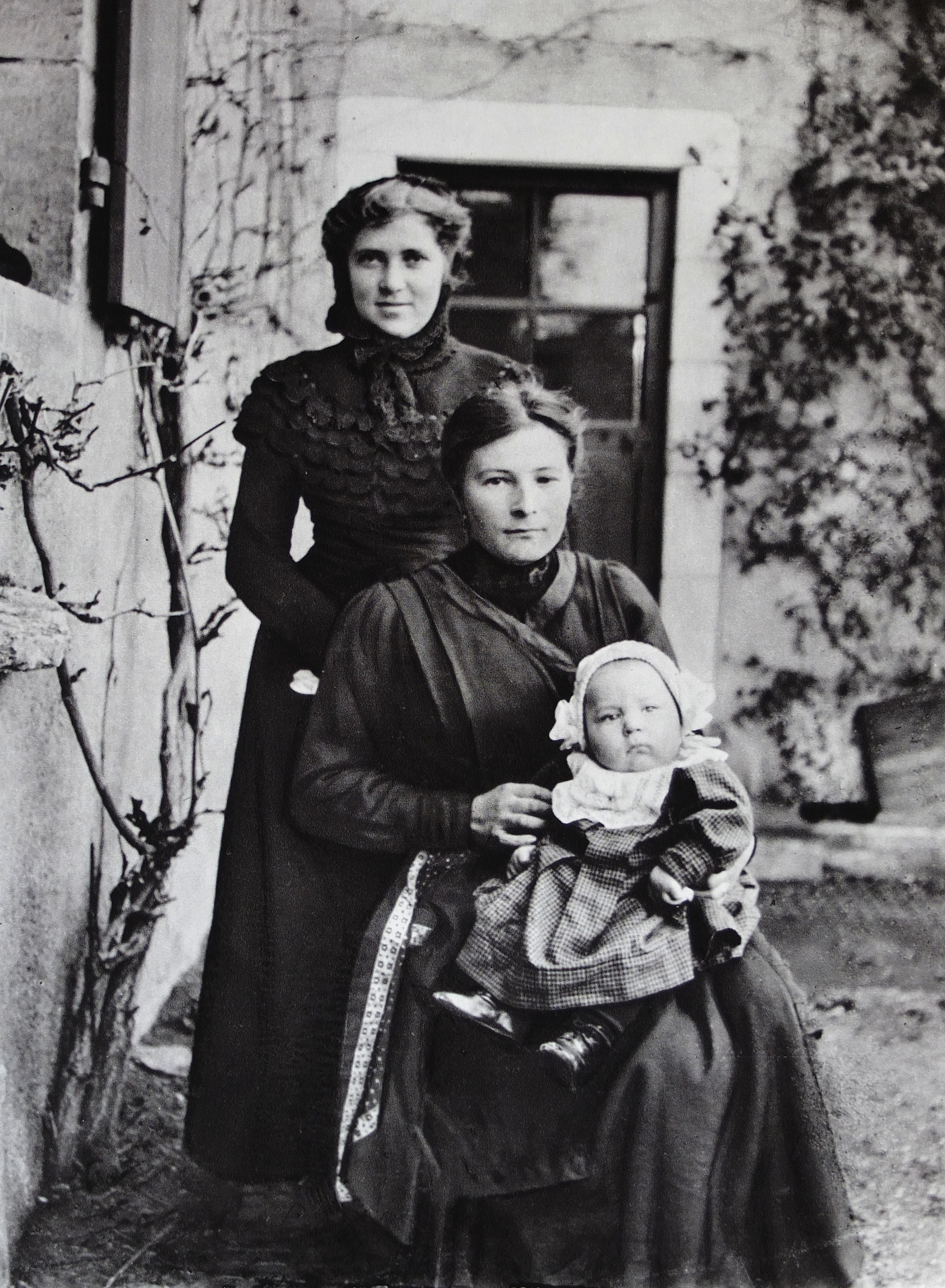
untitled

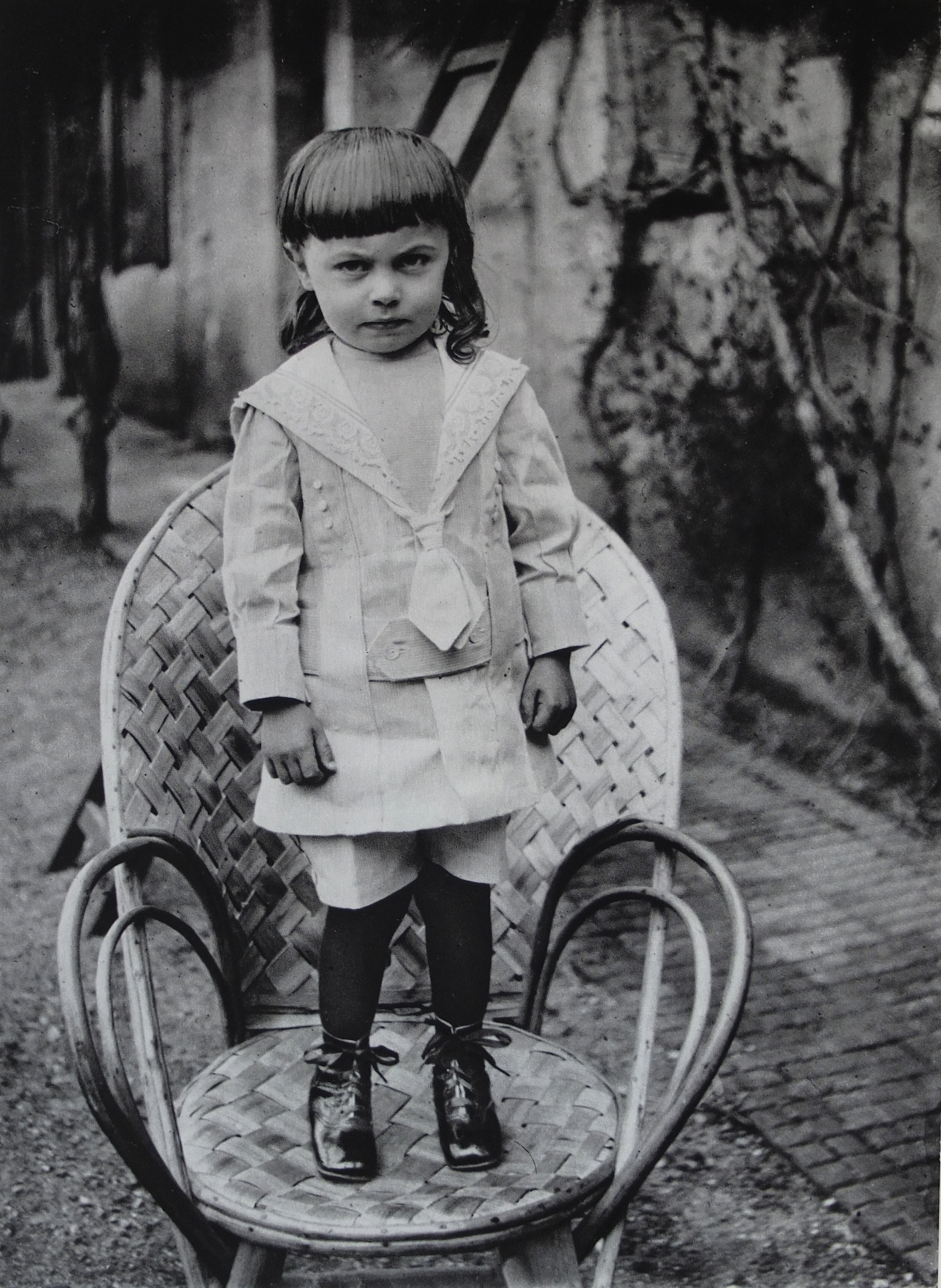
untitled

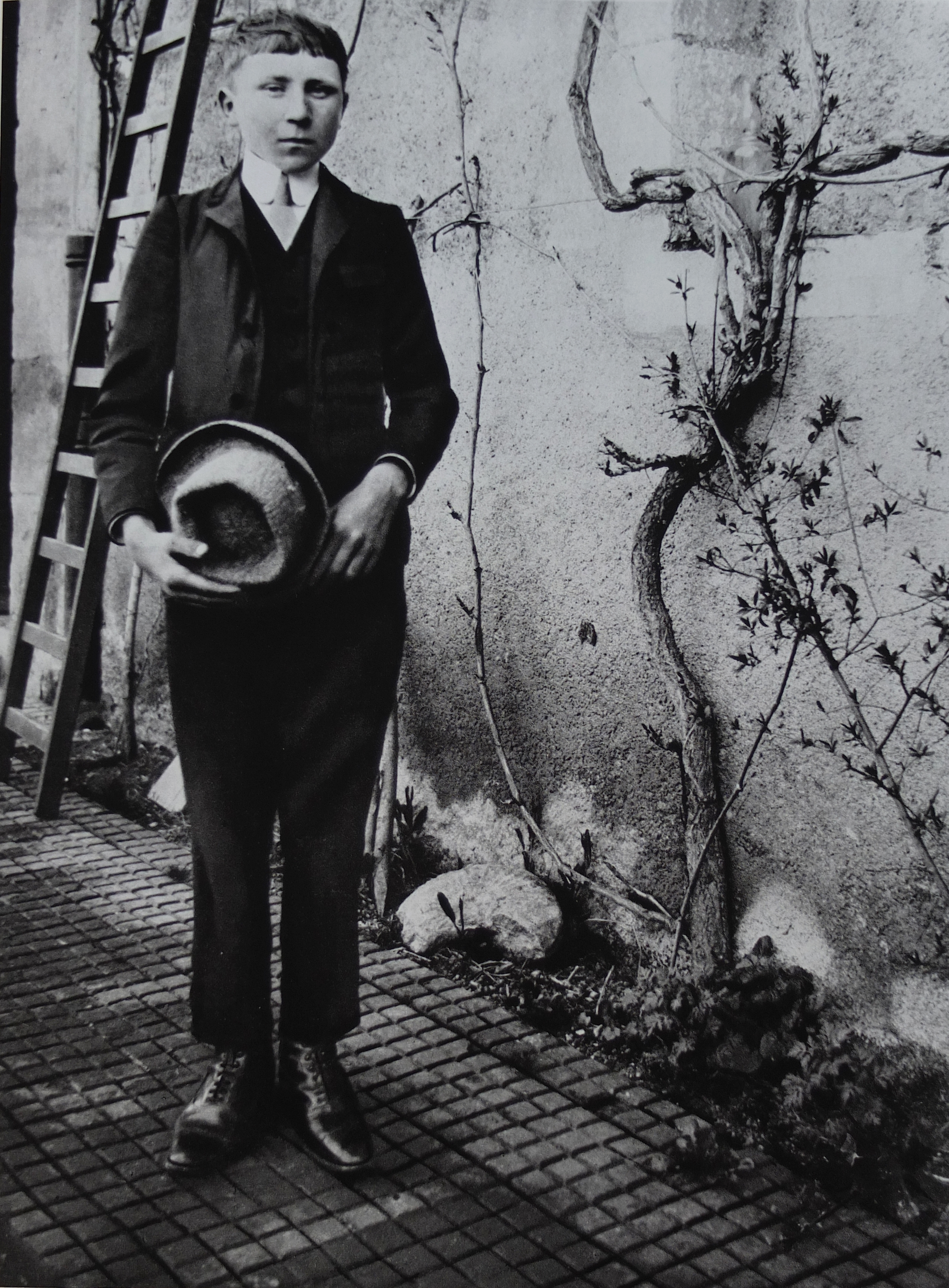
untitled

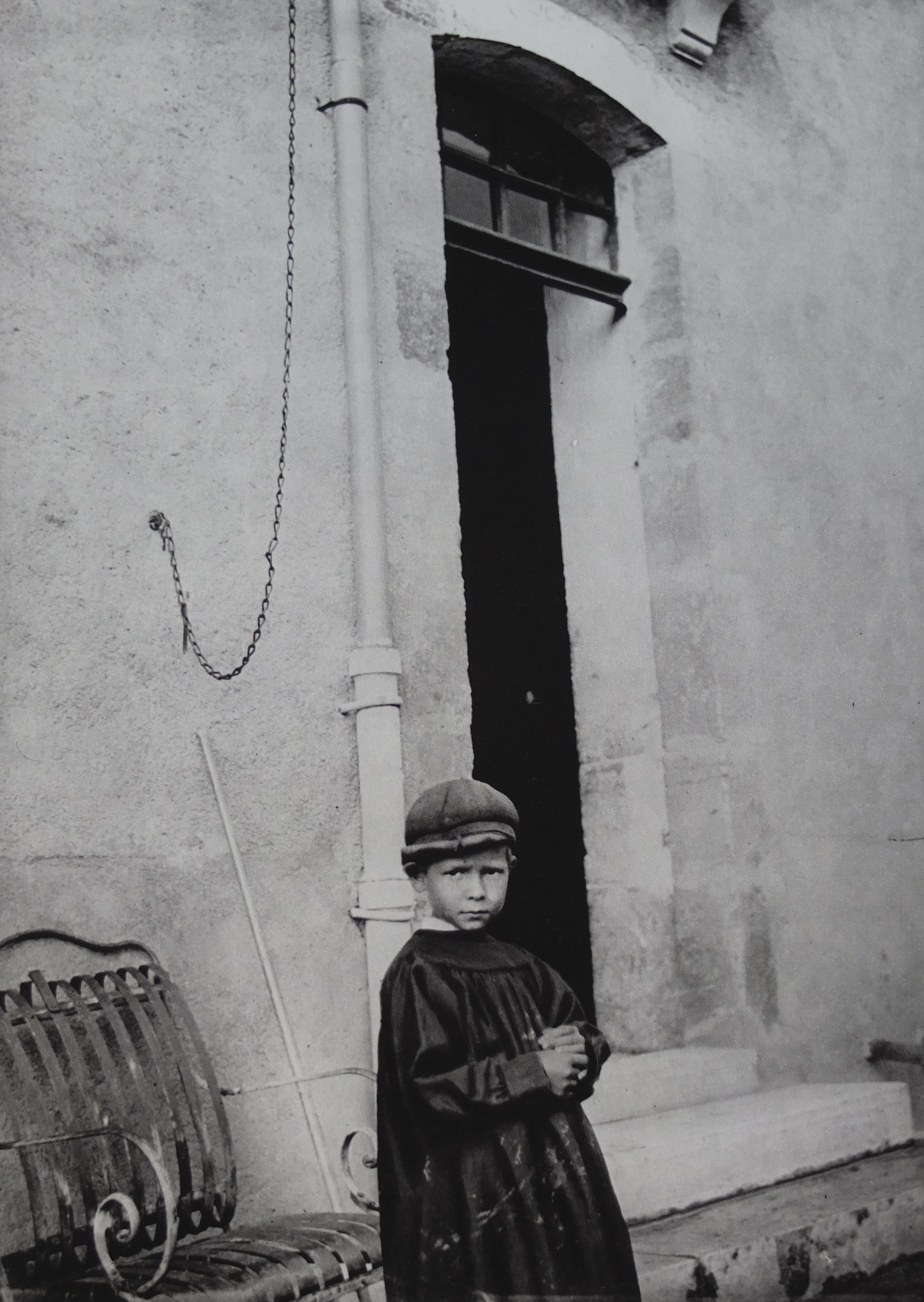
untitled

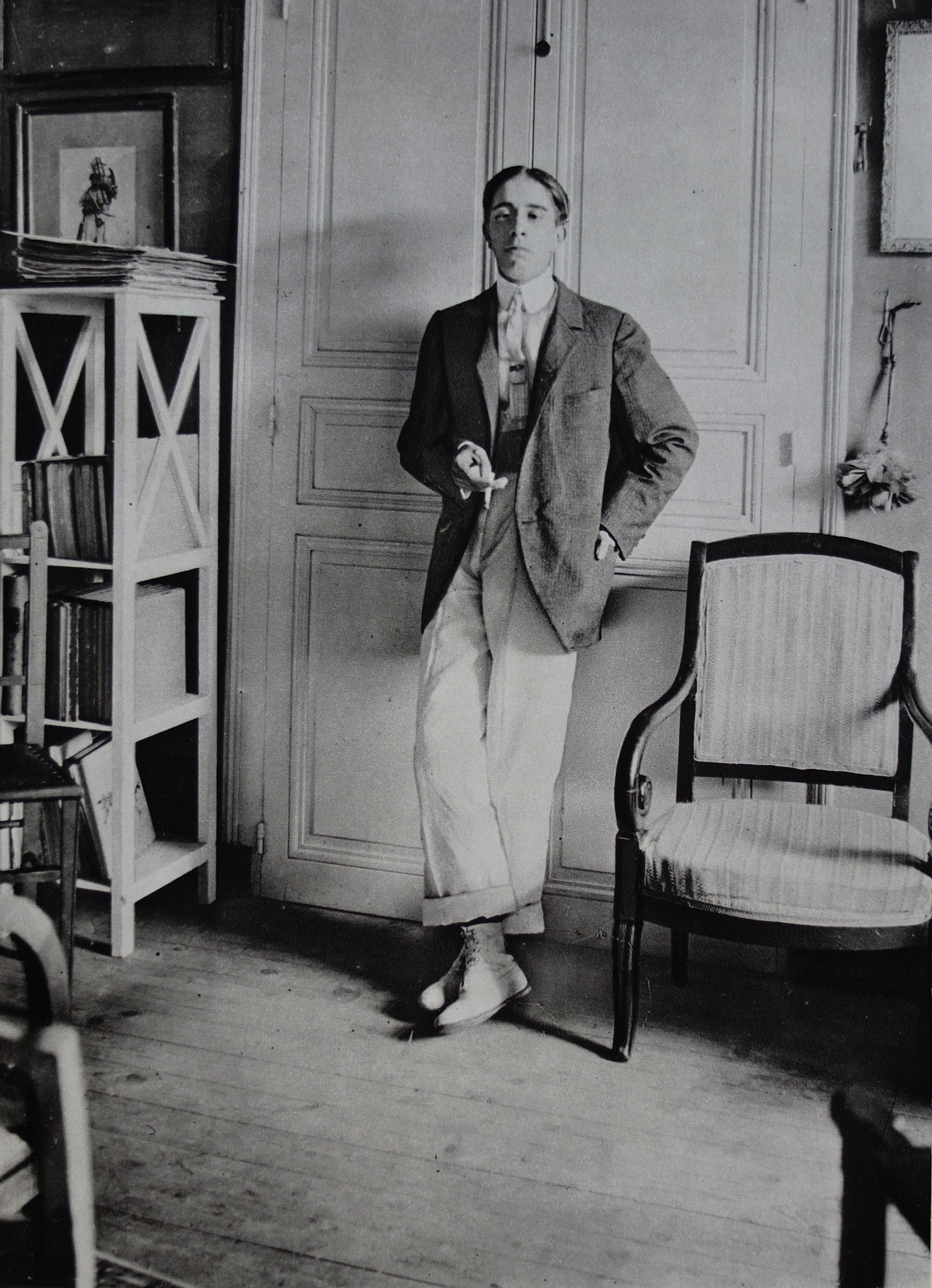
untitled

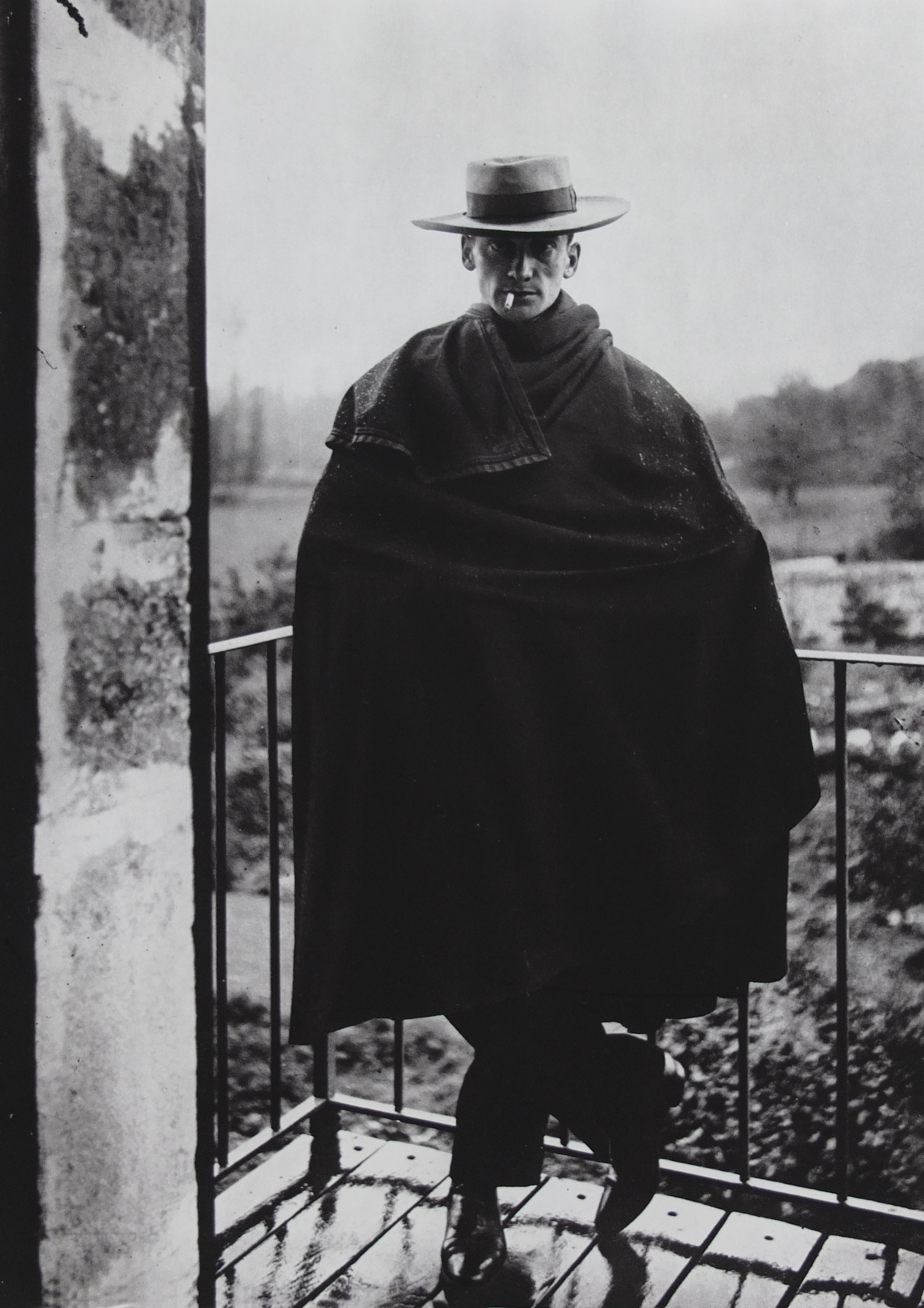
The artist,
Bernard Naudin

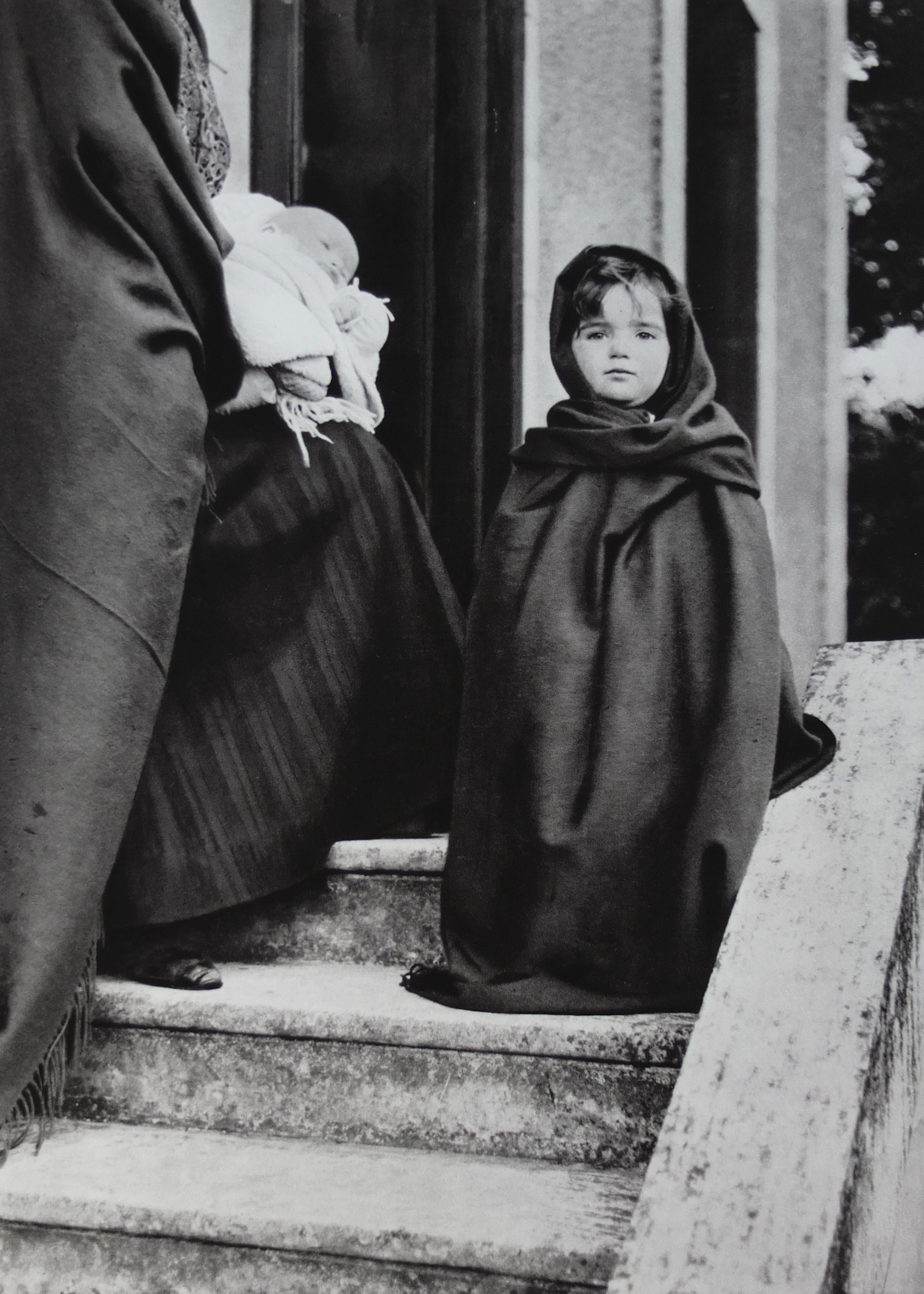
Marianne, daughter of Jean-Richard Bloch
