= Marie-José Chombart de Lauwe =

French resistance fighter (born 1923)

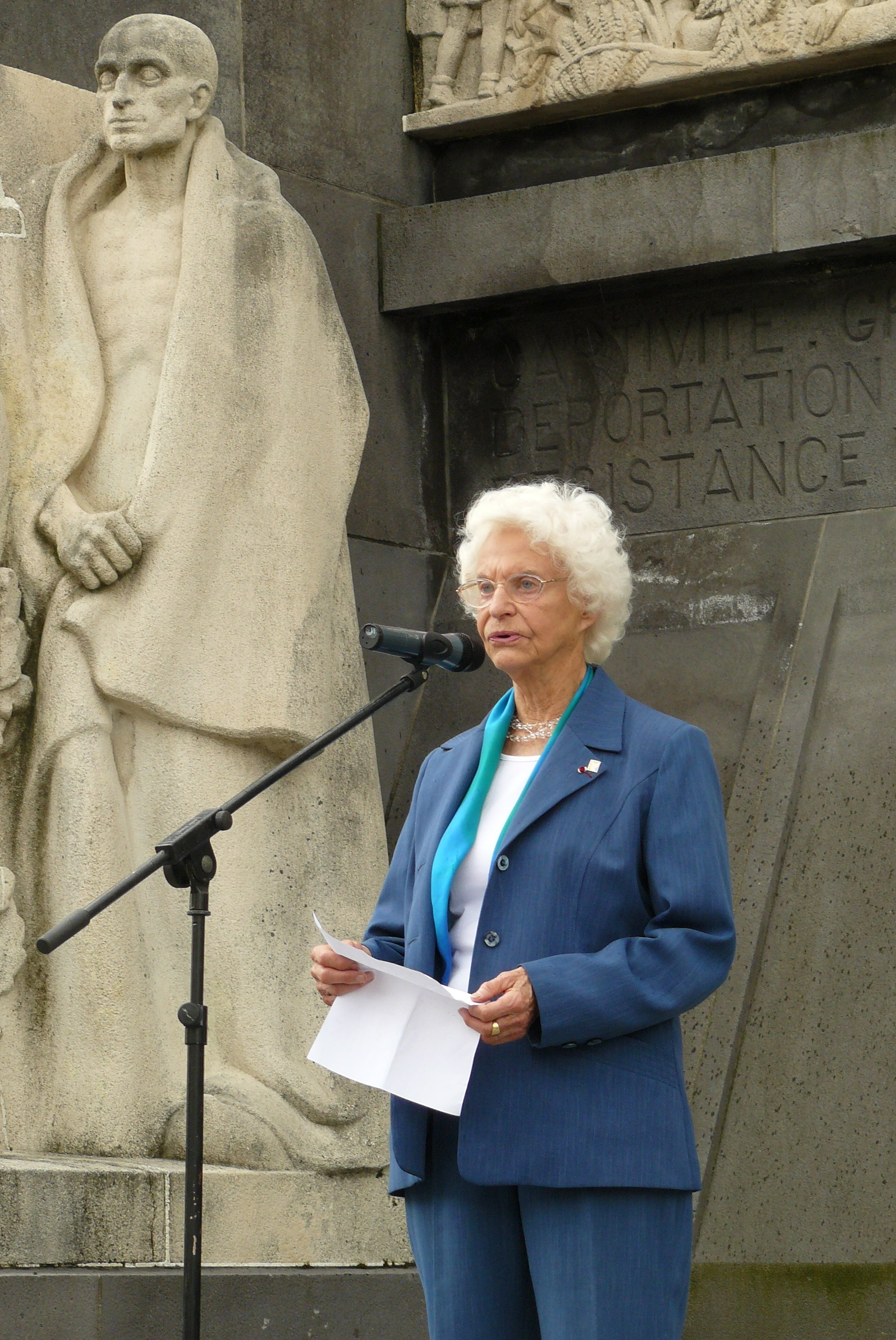
- Marie-José Chombart de Lauwe in 2007
- Born: 31 May 1923 (age 103); Paris, France
- Occupations: French resistance fighter, sociologist and militant for the protection of human rights

Marie-José Chombart de Lauwe (born 31 May 1923) is a French resistance fighter and sociologist. She was active as a resistance fighter in Brittany, was arrested in 1942, was interned in various prisons until being sent to Ravensbrück in 1942. There, she worked at the Siemens plant and in the Kinderzimmer before being evacuated in 1945 by the 'white bus' operation of the Swedish Red Cross. After returning from her internment, she became an influential sociologist and was active in advocating for the protection of human rights.

== Early life ==
Chombart de Lauwe was born in Paris on 31 May 1923. She is the daughter of Suzanne Wilborts, midwife, and Adrien Wilborts, a pediatrician of Flemish origin. Her father had been injured by gas from the trenches during the First World War. In her youth, she spent her vacations in Côtes-d'Armor, in Bréhat, where her grandmother lived. In 1936, her father took early retirement and the whole family moved to the island of Bréhat. Aged 12, she continued her studies on the island by correspondence.

During the 'phony war', she was a first-year student at Tréguier high school. It is there that she listened to Petain’s capitulation speech on 17 June 1940.

== Resistance in Brittany, 1940-1942 ==
Chombart de Lauwe joined the Resistance against the Nazi occupiers at the age of 17.

During the summer of 1940, German troops landed in Bréhat and requisitioned the houses. In the Chombart de Lauwe home, the family listened to the voice of London from a radio hidden behind a painting. Along with her mother and father, Chombart de Lauwe joined the Resistance, where she served as a messenger. She was fully aware of the dangers: 'Despite my young age, I didn’t do that naively. The executions happened very quickly, the context was heavy, we measured the risks.'

In the fall of 1941, she began studying medicine at the university in Rennes and obtained an Ausweis (pass) which allowed her to travel in a prohibited area towards the coast to see her parents. She slipped crucial information into her anatomy notebooks and was able to deliver it, thanks to her pass. She was part of the 'Bande à Sidonie,' (a resistance network with units in Tréguier, Lannion, Perros-Guirec and Paimpol). The group was led by Jean-Baptiste Legeay, a priest and teacher. The group was created by her mother and then integrated into the 'Georges France 31' network linked to British intelligence. The group provided aid to downed British aviators trying to escape to Great Britain and in the transmission to London of information on Germany's coastal defences.

In Rennes, the members of the network met at the Café de l'Europe et de la Paix. In 1941, the resistance fighters on the coast were arrested, while the group in Rennes group remained intact. The unit's new liaison officer was a double agent working for the Abwehr. Chombart de Lauwe was arrested at her residence on 22 May 1942. She just has time to write a note on the kitchen table: 'I've been arrested. Inform family and friends.'

She was imprisoned in Rennes and later in Angers. There, she encountered her parents and 11 other members of her intelligence and escape network, who had also been arrested.

== Deportation to Ravensbrück ==
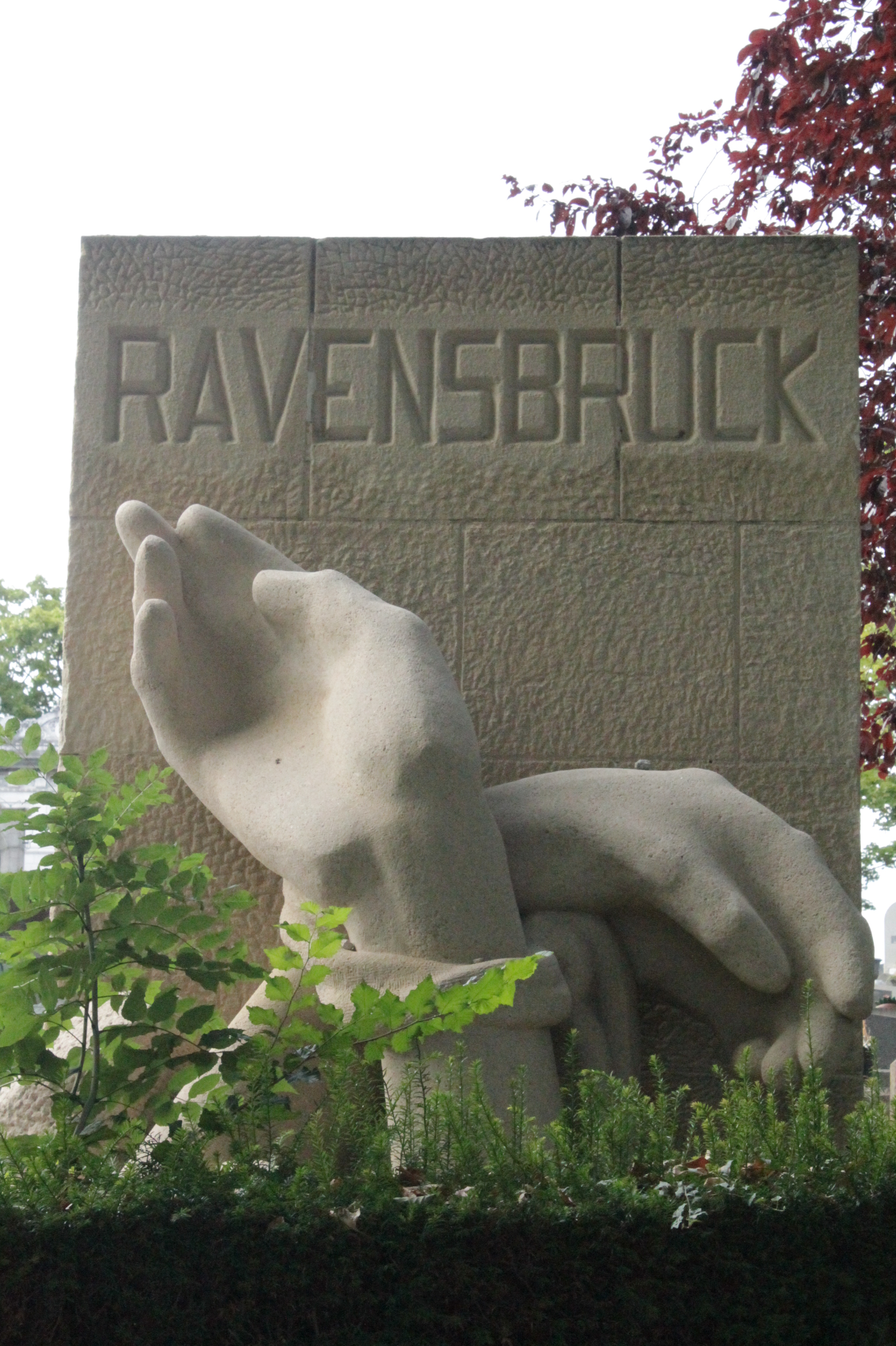
Memorial to Ravensbruck Concentration Camp, Père Lachaise Cemetery, Paris

Chombart de Lauwe was then transferred to La Santé prison in Paris and was interrogated by the Gestapo. There, she encountered the prominent resistant, Marie-Claude Vaillant-Couturier, and managed to communicate through the cement toilets with her neighbor, France Bloch-Sérazin. Aged 29, Bloch-Sérazin was a resistance fighter, a communist and a Jew who manufactured explosives and who would ultimately be guillotined for her work with the Resistance. Chombart de Lauwe described her experience in this prison and with the prisoners she met there as follows: 'À la Santé, j'ai connu la grandeur humaine.'

She was later taken to the Fresnes remand center and was sentenced to death. The sentence was later commuted to 'NN' deportation (Nacht und Nebel, or 'night and fog', which meant the person was a political prisoner who was not allowed contact with the outside world and whose burial place should remain secret). She was deported by train from the Gare de l'Est in Paris on 26 July 1943 to the Ravensbrück concentration camp. In the same wagon were her mother and 56 other French NN women. On their arrival, these 58 women was placed in block 32 of the NN.

Registered as prisoner 21706, Chombart de Lauwe worked in the camp's Siemens factory. She and her fellow inmates clandestinely made small gifts to support her camp comrades. She described the purpose of these seemingly trivial, but extremely dangerous acts as: 'We wanted to remain thoughtful and thinking beings by offering something on birthdays, even a poem.'

On 24 February 1944, her father died at the Buchenwald concentration camp. She learned of his death after the war when she returned to France.

== Kinderzimmer ==
In the summer of 1944, she was assigned to the Kinderzimmer (children's room), block 11 at Ravensbruck. The Kinderzimmer was created to take care of newborns following the German debacle of 1944. The births of children in the camp had become uncontrollable in 1944 (previously mothers died before giving birth or the babies were killed). It was a room with two bunk beds for up to 40 babies; there was no hygiene, no diapers and no baby bottles. The women of the camp managed to supply a little laundry, small bottles and milk, but this did not prevent the death of almost all the children. Out of 500 births recorded at Ravensbrück, only 31 children survived (most of them survivors were born shortly before the liberation of the camp).

It is not known with certainty how many children were born during deportation, but work done by the Foundation for the Memory of Deportation (FMD) identified 23 French children born in Ravensbrück, of whom only three survived: Sylvie Aymler (born in March 1945), Jean-Claude Passerat (November 1944) and Guy Poirot (March 1945).

Chombart de Lauw also witnessed the forced sterilization of Gypsy women and the medical experiments carried out by Nazi doctors on young Polish resistance fighters from Block 32 of the NN. After the war, she testified against Fritz Suhren, commander of the Ravensbrück camp from 1942 to 1945, who was prosecuted by a French military court and executed for crimes against humanity.

Chombart de Lauw described her work in the Kinderzimmer as follows:

The two worst things I encountered in Ravensbrück were the ‘rabbits’, that's what we called the unfortunate women who were used in Nazi experiments, and the babies (...) They looked like old men. (...) I encountered the daily death of children and the despair of mothers. But it was my vocation: I had to save a few lives (...) It was a new resistance, but with so few results.

She was transferred with the other 'Nacht und Nebel' prisoners on 2 March 2, 1945 to Mauthausen. They were released on April 21 and evacuated to Switzerland by the International Red Cross following a negotiation between Himmler and Count Folke Bernadotte on behalf of the Swedish Red Cross and the ‘white bus’ operation.

== After the war ==
After being freed from Mauthausen, Chombart de Lauwe arrived in Paris on 1 May 1945. She then returned to her home on the island of Bréhat and began the task of rebuilding herself, psychologically and physically. She resumed her medical studies and married Paul-Henry Chombart de Lauwe. They had 4 children. She became politically active in the fight against torture during the Algerian War. In 1954, she joined the French National Centre for Scientific Research (CNRS) and worked with Georges Heuyer, head of the child psychiatry department at the Salpêtrière hospital.

A member of the League of Human Rights, she is part of the collegial presidency of the National Federation of Resistant and Patriotic Deportees and Internees (FNDIRP) and, since 1996, has chaired the Foundation for the Memory of Deportation, succeeding Marie-Claude Vaillant-Couturier in this role.

With her husband Paul-Henry Chombart de Lauwe, Chombart de Lauwe did sociological research in the National Center for Ethnology. Her research focused on women and children.

== Distinctions ==
- Grand-croix de la Légion d'honneur in 2021; Grand officier in 2008.
- Médaille de la Résistance française. 31 March 1947.
