= Pierre Abraham =

French journalist and military figure (1892–1974)

Pierre Abraham (1 March 1892 – 20 May 1974 in Paris) was a French journalist, essayist and military figure in the French Air Force during the world wars.

== Biography ==
A graduate of the Ecole Polytechnique, he served during World War I from 1914 to 1918 as an aviator officer. After the war, his brother Jean-Richard Bloch encouraged him to write and he entered various literary circles. He began with criticism in newspapers and magazines. He worked on the magazine Europe since the magazine was founded and published several essays, and was noticed for his originality. In 1935, he led a research team in compiling the French Encyclopedia.

During World War II, he participated in the Resistance and Liberation of Nice where he became city councilor from 1947 to 1959. As Lieutenant-Colonel of the Reserve Air Force, he was appointed to the Executive Secretary of the Liberation of Allied Air Berlin.

From 1949 until his death in 1974, he functioned as the head editor of Europe. In the last years of his life, he directed the collective work of the Histoire littéraire de la France.

== Works ==
- Balzac, Rieder, 1929
- Figures, Gallimard, 1929
- Proust, Rieder, 1930
- Créatures chez Balzac, Gallimard, 1930
- Le physique au théâtre, Coutan-Lambert, 1933
- Une figure, deux visages, 1934
- Tiens bon la rampe, roman, 1951
- Les trois frères, Editeurs Français Réunis, 1971
- Freud, Editeurs Français Réunis, 1974
