= Jean-Richard Bloch =

French critic, novelist and playwright (1884–1947)

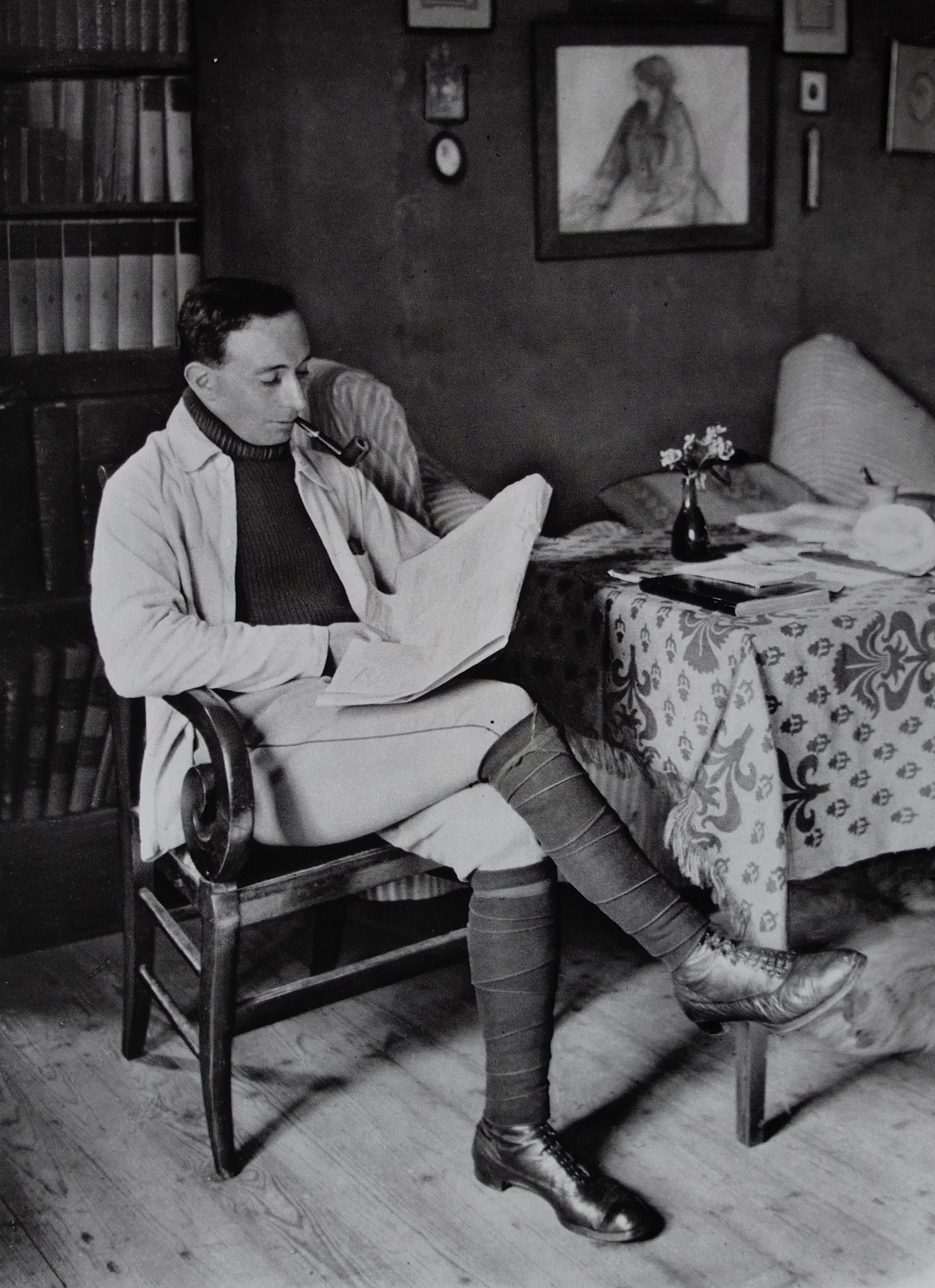
- Bloch photographed by Jenny de Vasson, c. 1915
- Born: 25 May 1884; 8th arrondissement of Paris, French Third Republic
- Died: 15 March 1947 (aged 62); 1st arrondissement of Paris, French Fourth Republic
- Burial place: Père Lachaise Cemetery
- Occupations: Critic; novelist; playwright
- Political party: French Communist Party
- Spouse: Marguerite Herzog (m. 1907)
- Children: 4, including France Bloch-Sérazin
- Parents: Richard Bloch (father); Louise Bloch (mother)
- Relatives: André Maurois (brother-in-law); Arturo Serrano Plaja (son-in-law)

Signature
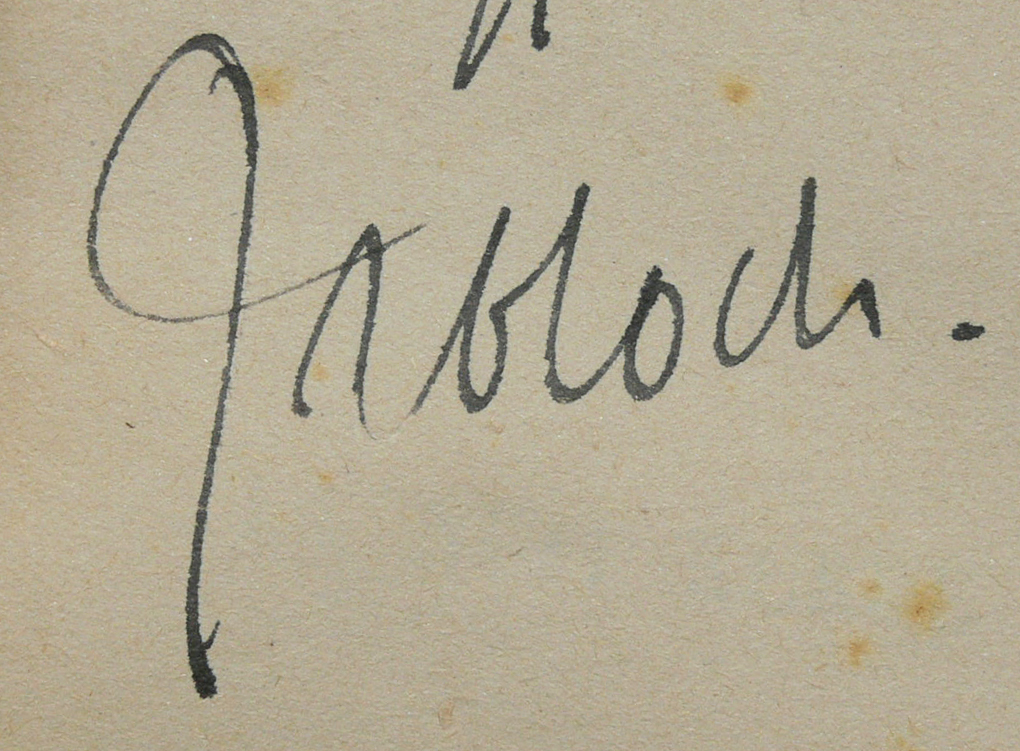

Jean-Richard Bloch (French: [ʒɑ̃ ʁiʃaʁ blɔk]; 25 May 1884 in Paris – 15 March 1947) was a French critic, novelist and playwright.

He was a member of the French Communist Party (PCF) and worked with Louis Aragon in the evening daily Ce soir.

== Early life ==
Jean Bloch was born into a Jewish family. His father was an engineer with the SNCF.

== Literary career ==
Bloch became a professional writer in 1909, after working for two years in a high school as an aggregated teacher. By this time, he was already known as a left-leaning intellectual. In 1910 he launched L’Effort libre, a "review of revolutionary civilization", under the pseudonym Jean-Richard.

He joined the French Army in World War I and was injured three times on the battlefields of the Marne and in Verdun. After the war, he felt remorse for having joined the army. He also suffered from neurosis caused by the horrors of war and by the premature death of his youngest daughter, Solange. It was during this time that Bloch traveled to Africa on the advice of a friend. His logbook made during this maritime voyage was published in newspapers and magazines of the period and was later serialized into a three volume book set.

A socialist since he was a student, he joined the French Communist Party in 1921 but left it at the time of Bolshevization. In 1923 he, Romain Rolland, and a committee of writers, contributed to the creation of the magazine Europe.

Bloch campaigned in favor of the anti-fascist cause and the Popular Front and got closer to the Communist Party. After the crisis of February 6, 1934, he joined the Vigilance Committee of Antifascist Intellectuals (CVIA) and the Association of Revolutionary Writers and Artists (AEAR). In August 1934 he actively participated in the International Congress of Writers for the Defense of Culture in 1935 and after the outbreak of the Spanish Civil War, he rejoined the PCF and with Louis Aragon, in the founding of the communist daily Ce soir March 1937.

In 1937, he was responsible for organising Naissance d'une cité, a "popular spectacle" performed on 19 October as part of the Exposition Internationale des Arts et Techniques dans la Vie Moderne.

After the outbreak of World War II, the PCF was banned and the newspaper L'Humanité was closed, and a trial was organized against communist deputies. In 1940, Bloch, together with physicist Paul Langevin and communist activist Marcel Cachin, acted as a witness for the defense. As German troops approached, Bloch left Paris and reached Poitiers on foot, but in the fall he returned to the capital, where he participated in the underground press. Since being in an illegal position became more and more dangerous, the writer decided to leave his homeland with his wife and arrived in Moscow in the spring of 1941. After the German attack on the USSR, he spoke on Moscow radio as one of the only French intellectuals residing in the Soviet Union.

In December 1944, Bloch and his wife returned to Paris. In Paris, Bloch again headed the editorial office of the Ce soir newspaper, became one of the founders of the Franco-USSR society, and began preparations for the publication of his new books. In December 1946, he was elected Councilor of the Republic (Conseil de la République), roughly equivalent to a modern senator. His literary and social activities were interrupted by his sudden death on March 15, 1947. He was buried in the Père Lachaise cemetery in Paris.

== Family life ==
In 1907, he married Marguerite Herzog, sister of André Maurois. Bloch's 86-year-old mother Louise Lévy was killed in Auschwitz. His eldest daughter, Marianne (1909) married Gérard Milhaud, and both members of the Resistance in Lyon. His son Michel managed to escape with the help of the partisans. His daughter, France Bloch-Sérazin, was executed in Hamburg by the German and posthumously recognised as a hero of the Resistance. His other daughter Claude, was the wife of Arturo Serrano Plaja, Spanish poet and military officer of the Republican forces who was sent to exile.

== Literary works ==
- A Publisher of "L'Effort Libre", 1910–1914 (left-wing literary magazine)
- Lévy, 1912
- ... et Compagnie, 1918 (novel)
- La nuit Kurde (novel)
- Sybilla, 1932 (novel)
- Carnaval est mort, 1920 (critic)
- A leader of "Europe" (with Jean Guéhenno)
- Offrande à la musique, 1930 (ballet)
- Destin du siècle, 1931
- Naissance d'une culture, 1936
- Toulon (a play)
- De la France trahie à la France en armes, 1949
