= Jean Guéhenno =

French writer (1890–1978)

- Born: 25 March 1890; Fougères, Ille-et-Vilaine
- Died: 22 September 1978 (aged 88); Paris

Jean Guéhenno born Marcel-Jules-Marie Guéhenno (25 March 1890 – 22 September 1978) was a French essayist, writer and literary critic.

== Life and career ==
Jean Guéhenno, writer and educator, was a prominent contributor to the NRF. He was editor-in-chief of the literary journal Europe from 1929 until May 1936. Guéhenno wrote one novel, The Dead Youth, based on his memories of World War I.

During the Nazi occupation of France, Guéhenno refused to publish, believing to do so would be collaboration. Instead, he kept a secret journal, chronicling the infringement by the Vichy government of traditional French rights and values, and his own efforts on behalf of the Resistance. This was published in France in 1947.

The first English translation of the journal, by David Ball, was published in 2014 under the title Diary of the Dark Years, 1940–1944.

According to the translator's introduction, it is "the book French readers have turned to most readily for an account of life under German occupation." The Wall Street Journal featured it "as the top entry in its list of the Five Best books on the French Resistance."

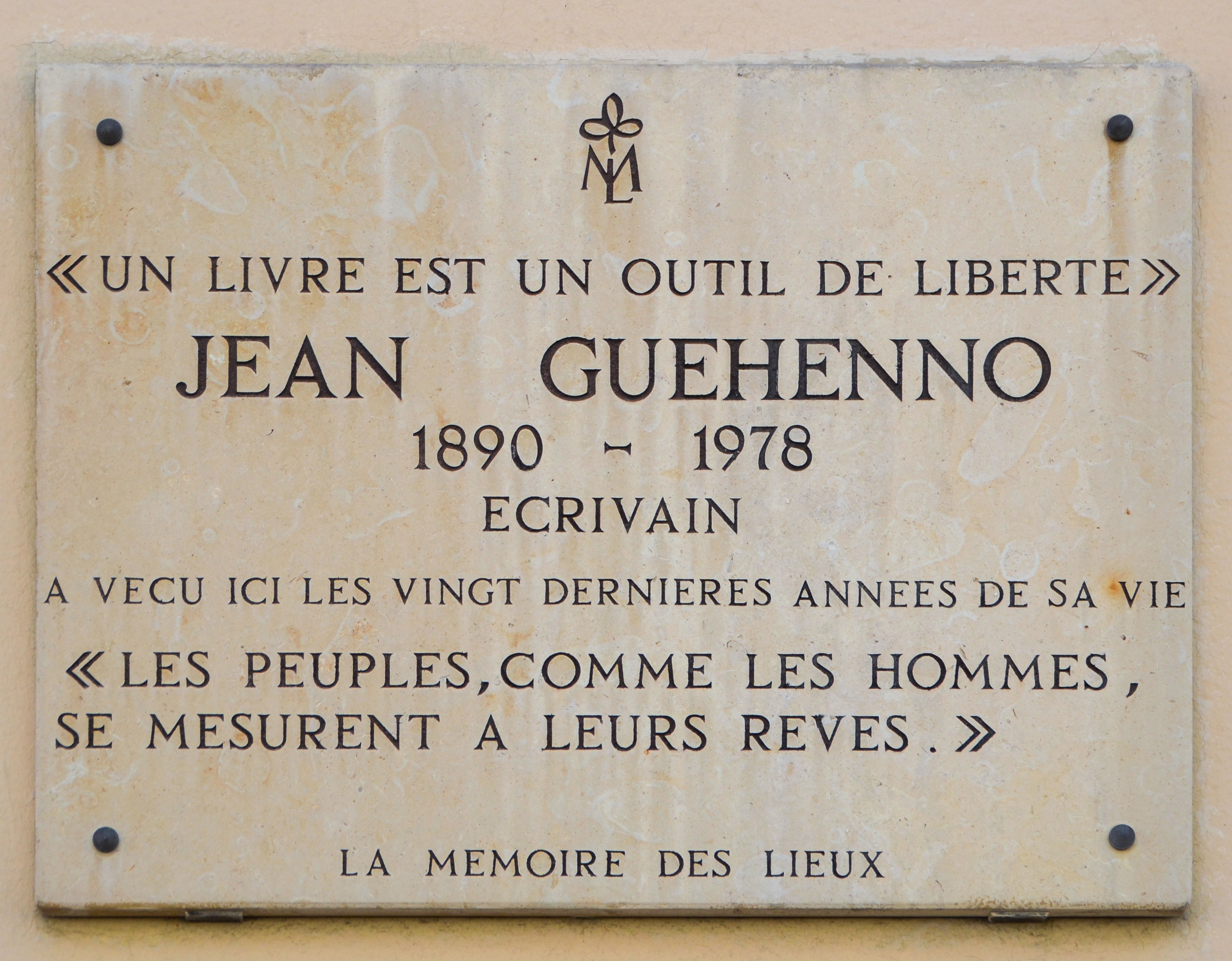
Commemoration plaque in Paris (5th arr.), 35-37 rue Pierre Nicole, where Jean Guéhenno lived for twenty years, until his death.

Jean Guéhenno was elected to the Académie française on 25 January 1962.
