= Outline of aesthetics =

Overview of and topical guide to aesthetics

The following outline is provided as an overview of and topical guide to aesthetics:

Aesthetics – branch of philosophy and axiology concerned with the nature of beauty.

== Description of aesthetics ==
Aesthetics can be described as all of the following:

- Branch of philosophy –
  - the philosophical study of beauty
    - the sublime
    - Aesthetic judgments
    - Aesthetic taste
  - the philosophy of art
    - Definitions of art
    - Value of art
    - Attitudes toward art

== Related academic areas ==
- Applied aesthetics
- Architecture
- Art
- Arts criticism
- Gastronomy
- Aesthetics of nature
- History of painting
- Painting
- Philosophy of film
- Aesthetic medicine
  - Aesthetic dentistry
  - Plastic surgery
- Aesthetics of music
- Philosophy of music
- Theory of painting
- Poetry
- Psychological aesthetics
- Aesthetics of science
- Sculpture
- Theological aesthetics

== History of aesthetics ==
- History of aesthetics
  - History of aesthetics (pre-20th-century)

== Aesthetics and art movements ==
- Classicism
- Romanticism
- Historicism
- Marxist aesthetics
- Modernism
  - Symbolism
- Postmodernism
  - Psychoanalytic theory

== Aesthetics by time and location ==
- African aesthetic
  - Itutu
- Ancient aesthetics
- Indian aesthetics
  - Rasa
- Japanese aesthetics
  - Iki
- Medieval aesthetics

== Concepts in aesthetics ==
- Aesthetic emotions
- Art manifesto
- Art object
- Avant-garde
- Beauty
- Boring
- Camp
- Comedy
- Cool
- Creativity
- Cute
- Disgusting
- Ecstasy
- Elegance
- Entertainment
- Ephemerality
- Eroticism
- Fun
- Gaze
- Harmony
- Hauntology
- Humour
- Interpretation
- Judgement
- Kitsch
- Literary merit
- Lo-fi
- Mathematics and art
- Mathematical beauty
- Perception
- Picturesque
- Pretentious
- Rasa
- Style
- Sublime
- Taste
- Tragedy

more...

== Philosophers of art and aestheticians ==
=== Ancient ===
- Plato
- Aristotle
- Plotinus
- Augustine

=== Pre-20th Century ===
- Francis Hutcheson
- David Hume
- Adam Smith
- Immanuel Kant
- Edmund Burke
- Johann Gottfried Herder
- Johann Wolfgang von Goethe
- Friedrich Schiller
- G. W. F. Hegel
- Arthur Schopenhauer
- Friedrich Nietzsche

=== Contemporary ===
- Theodor W. Adorno
- Alexander Gottlieb Baumgarten
- Clive Bell
- Walter Benjamin
- Bernard Bosanquet
- Edward Bullough
- R. G. Collingwood
- Arthur Danto
- John Dewey
- George Dickie
- Hubert Dreyfus
- Curt John Ducasse
- Thierry de Duve
- Roger Fry
- Nelson Goodman
- Martin Heidegger
- Paul Klee
- Susanne Langer
- Theodor Lipps
- György Lukács
- Jean-François Lyotard
- Joseph Margolis
- Jacques Maritain
- Maurice Merleau-Ponty
- Thomas Munro
- José Ortega y Gasset
- Dewitt H. Parker
- Stephen Pepper
- David Prall
- I. A. Richards
- George Santayana
- Irving Singer
- Richard Wollheim
- more ...
