= Medieval aesthetics =

General philosophy of beauty during the Medieval period

Medieval aesthetics refers to the general philosophy of beauty during the Medieval period. Although Aesthetics did not exist as a field of study during the Middle Ages, influential thinkers active during the period did discuss the nature of beauty and thus an understanding of medieval aesthetics can be obtained from their writings.

Medieval aesthetics is characterized by its synthesis of Classical and Christian conceptions of beauty. The thought of Aristotle and Plato, framed by that of the Neoplatonist Plotinus, placed an emphasis on concepts such as harmony, light, and symbolism. By contrast, readings of the Bible inspired an interrogation of the relationship between nature and the divine. The writings of St Augustine and Pseudo-Dionysius integrated Plato and Plotinus with early Church Doctrine, while St Thomas Aquinas incorporated Aristotelian philosophy into his discussion of beauty in nature. The theological concerns of these writers meant that their aesthetic theories were relatively neglected post-Enlightenment, but their influence had been extensive, especially during the Renaissance. In recent times, the works of Spanish director Luis Buñuel have been inspired by medieval theories of beauty.

== Historiography ==
Aesthetics as a distinct philosophical branch did not exist during the Middle Ages. Medieval aesthetics as a subject comprises studies of key medieval thinkers by modern writers, such as Umberto Eco and Edgar de Bruyne. That medieval philosophies of beauty are implicit rather than explicit is in part due to the fact that the broader philosophical mentality of the period was highly traditional and that 'innovation came without fanfare'. For Eco, his historical approach is evident in his belief that aesthetics must be viewed as 'the ways in which a given epoch solved for itself aesthetic problems as they presented themselves at the time to the sensibilities and culture of its people'.

== Origins ==
Medieval aesthetics largely derive from the writings of Plato, Aristotle and Plotinus, when viewed through the lens of medieval Biblical exegesis.

=== The Bible ===
Aesthetic consideration of the material world comes mainly from the Old Testament. According to Tatarkiewicz, the importation of the Greek concept of kalos into Christian thought during the translation of the Hebrew into the Greek meant that the passage in Genesis, 'And God saw everything that he had made, and behold it was very beautiful,' emphasised the aesthetic qualities of creation. This sentiment was similarly translated into the Book of Wisdom which advances the mathematical nature of aesthetics and aligns the work of both God and humanity through their common manipulation of these mathematical qualities in order to create beauty.

=== Plato ===
In the Symposium the notion of the beautiful soul is introduced as more valuable than material beauty. Beauty is therefore aligned with the Good and this definition makes it compatible with Christian spirituality.

Plato's theory of the forms underlies much of the writings of St Augustine and Pseudo-Dionysius. The theory refers to the way in which material objects are merely the reflection or attempt at representation of a perfect, abstract reality. Within Plato's framework, these pure forms of reality are determined by a demiurge, but the Christian interpretation of Plato by Augustine and Dionysius holds that the forms mirror the perfection of God's own mind. This notion underlies the more significant notion of mimesis, whereby art and material beauty are considered the mere reflection of the beauty of that realm.

=== Aristotle ===
Aristotle followed Plato's approach in the Hippias Major and the Gorgias, positing the inferiority of smell, taste and touch by connecting aesthetic experience with the higher sensations of sight and sound. In Poetics he established some grounds for the medieval argument that the beautiful can be equated with the good as 'he believed a tragedy could cleanse negative emotions such as fear and pity'.

=== Plotinus ===
Plotinus is notable for his writings about beauty, which form a substantial part of what has come to be known as Neoplatonism. Plotinus particularly influenced medieval aesthetics by expanding the notion of beauty so that it was not exclusively conceived in terms of symmetry.

== Key thinkers ==
=== St Augustine ===
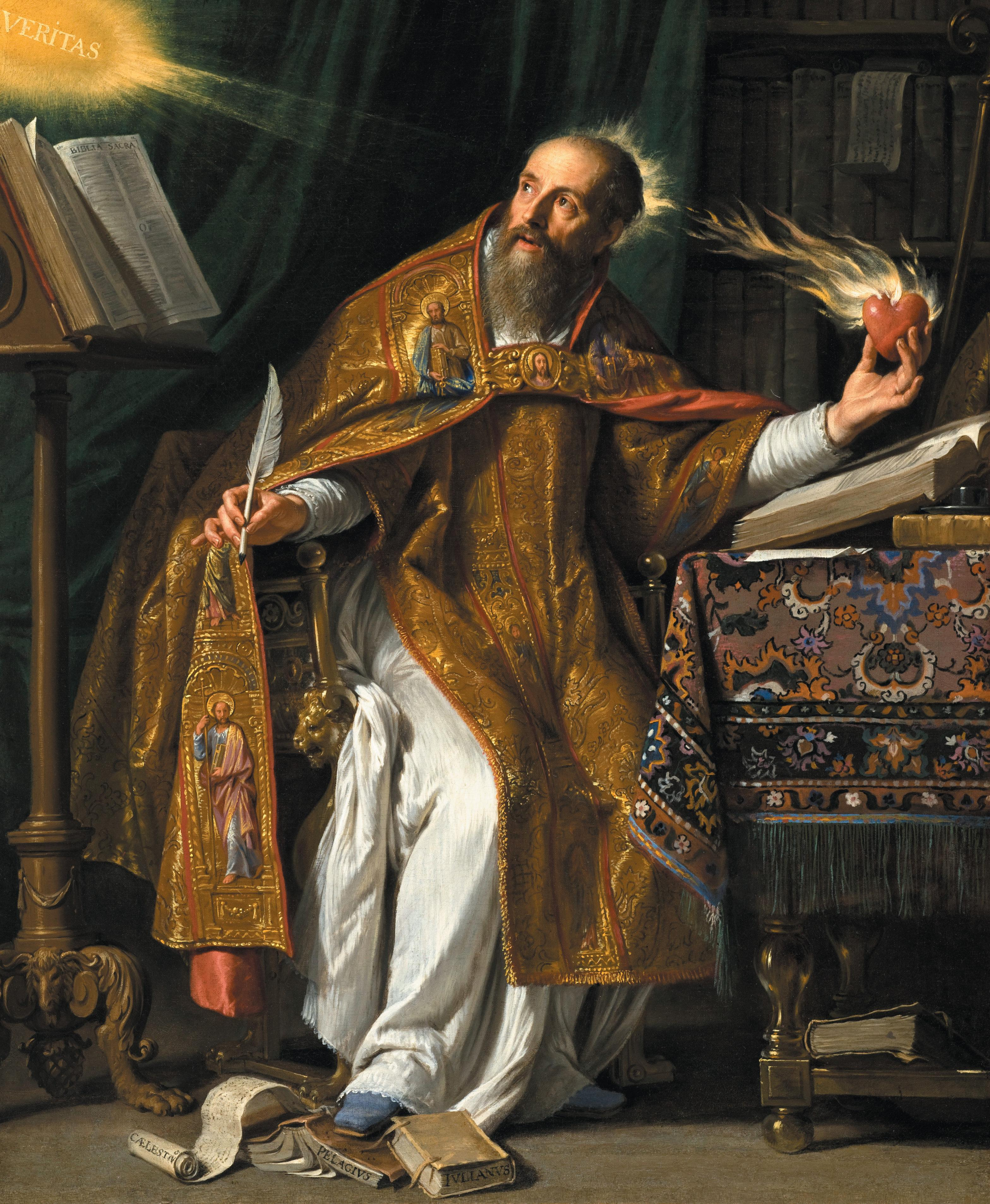
St Augustine, c. 1645–1650, by Philippe de Champaigne.

The aesthetics of St Augustine are less theological than that of subsequent thinkers due in part to his earlier life as a pagan. His conversion to Christianity allowed Augustine to implant Christianity with Classical ideals, whilst innovating Platonic and Ciceronian ideas with Christian belief.

Augustine's notion of beauty's objective existence is one of his most fundamental ideas. He writes that beauty is objective and that this objectivity is external to humans, who can contemplate beauty without having created it. Augustine wrote that something 'pleases because it is beautiful'. He highlighted that beauty is, in and of itself, an indispensable aspect of creation; it is inherently harmonious and its existence aligns with humanity's deepest, but 'proper' desires because measure, form and order make something good. In his work, On Music, Augustine asserts that beauty is the unity of disparate parts, such as lines, colours and sounds.

Augustine also expanded the Roman notion of number in rhythm to beauty more generally by regarding rhythm as the sole source of beauty. According to Augustine, every experience of beauty originates in and is determined by rhythm. Even though he placed heavy emphasis on the beauty of number and therefore equality or balance, he also realised the purpose of contrast or the inequality of parts. For example, he attributed the beauty of the world to the contrast between things and therefore he believed the correct and natural placement of things results in beauty.

=== Pseudo-Dionysius ===
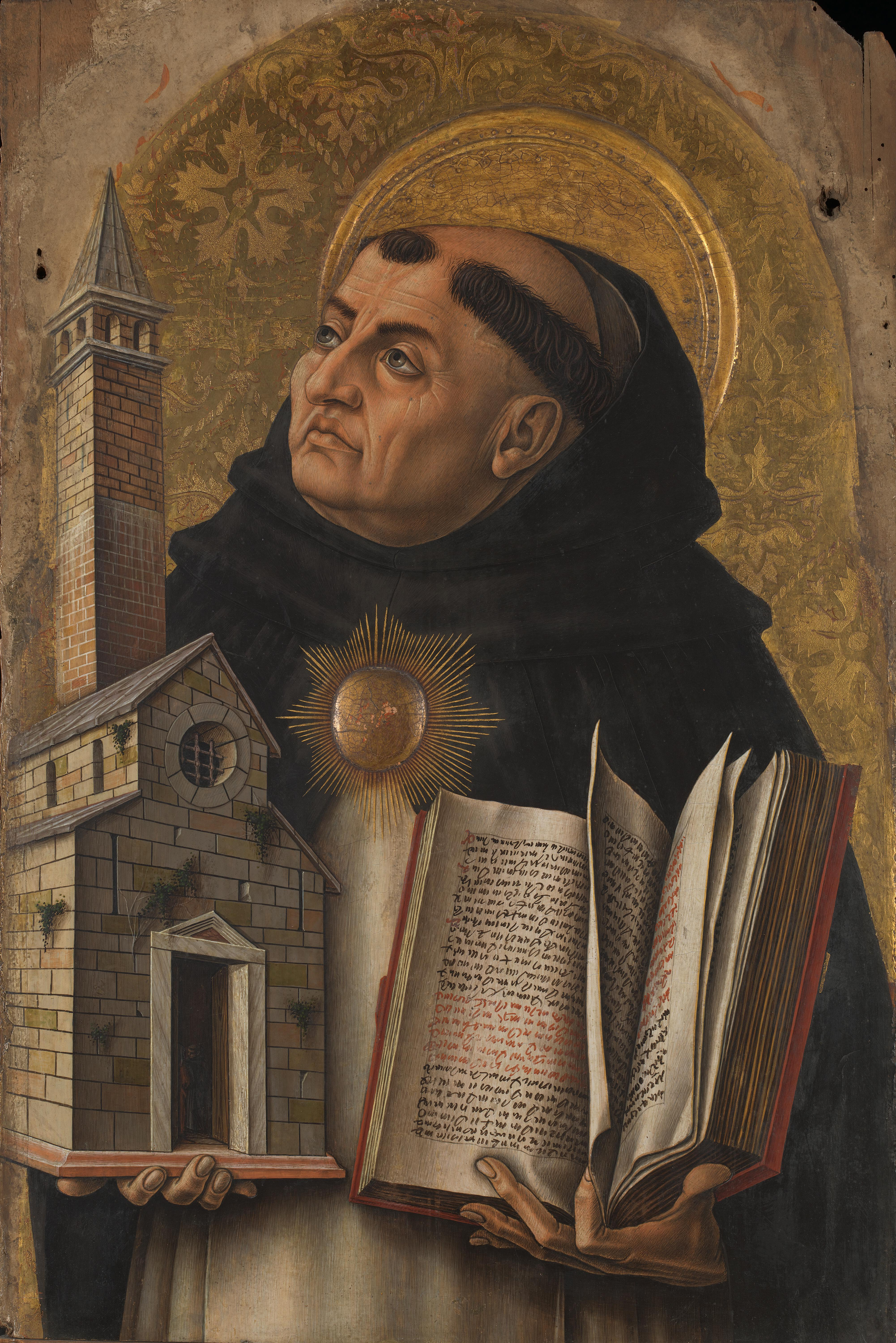
St Thomas Aquinas, 1476, by Carlo Crivelli.

Pseudo-Dionysius the Areopagite developed the Classical notion that the beautiful is aligned with the good by writing that beauty is the manifestation of goodness. He justified this assumption through his idea that God is the Cause of everything, meaning that beauty and the beautiful are the same because they have the same cause. He asserted that all things have beauty because everything originates in the Cause and that this means nothing can lose its beauty. For Pseudo-Dionysius there exists an Absolute Beauty from which all material beauty is derived through 'emanation'. This results in the earthly encounter with beauty that is divine, even though it may appear imperfect. Such a conception, according to Ananda K. Coomaraswamy, is important because medieval aesthetics were thereafter 'fundamentally based on [his] brief treatment of the Beautiful' in On the Divine Names. This treatment also involved the important step of using 'Beauty' as a divine name. According to Brendan Thomas Sammon, this approach influenced how St Thomas Aquinas came to treat beauty.

=== St Thomas Aquinas ===
St Thomas Aquinas gave two individualised definitions of beauty in the Summa Theologica. The first asserts that the beautiful is experienced through visual pleasure, while the second states that the beautiful is a pleasurable perception. These amount to a single definition of beauty that accounts for both subjective and objective experiences of beauty where the emphasis on sight and perception creates a holistic groundwork for understanding beauty. His most historically important idea regarding aesthetics was that the beautiful is pleasurable, while not all pleasures are beautiful.

Unlike his predecessor Pseudo-Dionysius, who started his aesthetics from the assumption of an absolute and divine beauty, Aquinas took material beauty subject to empiricism as his starting point. In departing from the Platonic transcendent, Aquinas moved towards Aristotelianism which enabled the exploration of the beautiful and the good as independent of each other. This move thus enabled Aquinas to develop an implicit criteria for beauty: actuality, proportion, radiance and wholeness.

== Proportion ==
Due to the enduring legacy of the Pythagoreans and Boethius' De Musica, musical principles of proportion were applied to the arts more generally, but with prominence in music and architecture. This gave rise to the re-appropriation of the Pythagorean notion musica mundana whereby the beauty of the world was viewed as a harmonious interaction of contrasts, namely that between macrocosm and microcosm. Proportion was considered an aspect of reality because it was 'not a product of the human mind, nor an invention of the musician'. The work of bishop and philosopher, Robert Grosseteste, embodied these assumptions as it used mathematics to explore harmony as a condition of beauty, such as in his belief that the numbers 1,2,3 and 4 were the source of musical principles. According to Umberto Eco, Medieval conceptions of beauty were based on the earlier Classical attempt to link mathematics with beauty: '[This conception of beauty's] many variations are reducible to the one fundamental principle of unity in variety.' These aesthetics also had a moral dimension borrowed from Pythagoras, for whom, for instance, certain musical proportions were believed to lead to sins.

Musical principles were often enacted into architecture so that buildings would be built according to an 'order reminiscent of a musical melody'. For this reason, architects were frequently called 'composers' who created beautiful buildings according to a 'divine arrangement' whereby correct proportions of latitude, longitude and altitude harmonised. Cathedrals exemplify construction according to these principles, and theology also informed the sense of proportion so that 'from an aerial viewpoint [they] were in the shape of a cross,' which created a sense of 'balance when viewed from within the cathedral'. As pointed out by both Charles Rufus Morey and Charles S. Baldwin, cathedrals embody the elision of theology and aesthetics.

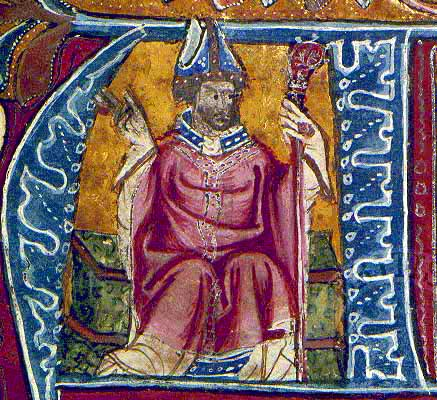
Robert Grosseteste whose work influenced Medieval thought on proportion and light.

== Light ==
A systematic aesthetics of light began to appear in the thirteenth century. Light was believed to endow physical objects with nobility and beauty because it 'constitut[ed] the essence of colour and at the same [was] the external condition of its visibility,' according to Edgar De Bruyne. The medieval concern with light was constant throughout aesthetics because it extended the Neoplatonist notion that light was emanation by placing it within an Aristotelian cosmology and asserting that it was the emanation of God. This idea is to be found particularly in the work of Pseudo-Dionysius where the sun symbolises the eternity of light and therefore the constancy of beauty. Robert Grosseteste's On Light is an example of the movement during the Middle Ages of trying to understand light in terms of beauty. One of the thirteenth century scholastics, Grosseteste helped to develop a 'metaphysics of light', whereby it was believed that the world was formed by the presence of light, with the straight rays of the sun impressing orderliness on its surface.

Light was considered to be intrinsically connected to heat, which was reflected in the belief that male beauty comprised a 'fresh and rosy, halfway between pale and flushed' complexion, which was influenced by the soul's warming of the blood because the soul had properties of light. De Bruyne also points to the contemporary focus on rare stones and metals as evincing the aesthetics of light, because the Latin etymologies of the French for bronze, gold and silver reflect a belief that they were made of illuminated air and that this was the source of the beauty.

== Symbolism ==
J. Huizinga points to the importance of symbolism during the Middle Ages as a way of comprehending the purpose of existence and therefore, it is key to understanding the medieval paradigm. Aesthetics were underlaid by theological and philosophical principles because the base assumption of the era was that God created everything in His likeness, meaning that aspects of His being could be perceived through a symbolic view of the world. For this reason, art did not explicitly depict the transcendentals of truth and beauty because symbolism was instead considered the closest way to apprehending 'traces' of the transcendentals in creation. Representational art was imbued with symbolism because this was a solution to balancing the notion that truth was grounded in natural observation against the attempt to depict the spiritual world, which was considered inherently different to reality and thus required idealisation without distorting truth.

As outlined by Tatartkiewicz, architecture was heavily founded upon notions of symbolism based on numbers with 'five doors symboli[sing] the five wise virgins, and twelve columns the twelve apostles. Pulpits were supported by eleven columns, symbolising the eleven apostles who were present at the Descent of the Holy Ghost, and the ciborium on ten columns symbolises the apostles who were not present at the Crucifixion'. Churches evinced considerable symbolism, which is particularly noticeable in Eastern churches where the writing of Pseudo-Dionysius enjoyed considerable attention, with his notion of emanation allowing churches to be viewed as extension of God. Edessa Cathedral, for instance, was built so that light entered it through three windows with three facades in order to symbolise the Holy Trinity, whilst the roof represented the sky.
