= Three perfections =

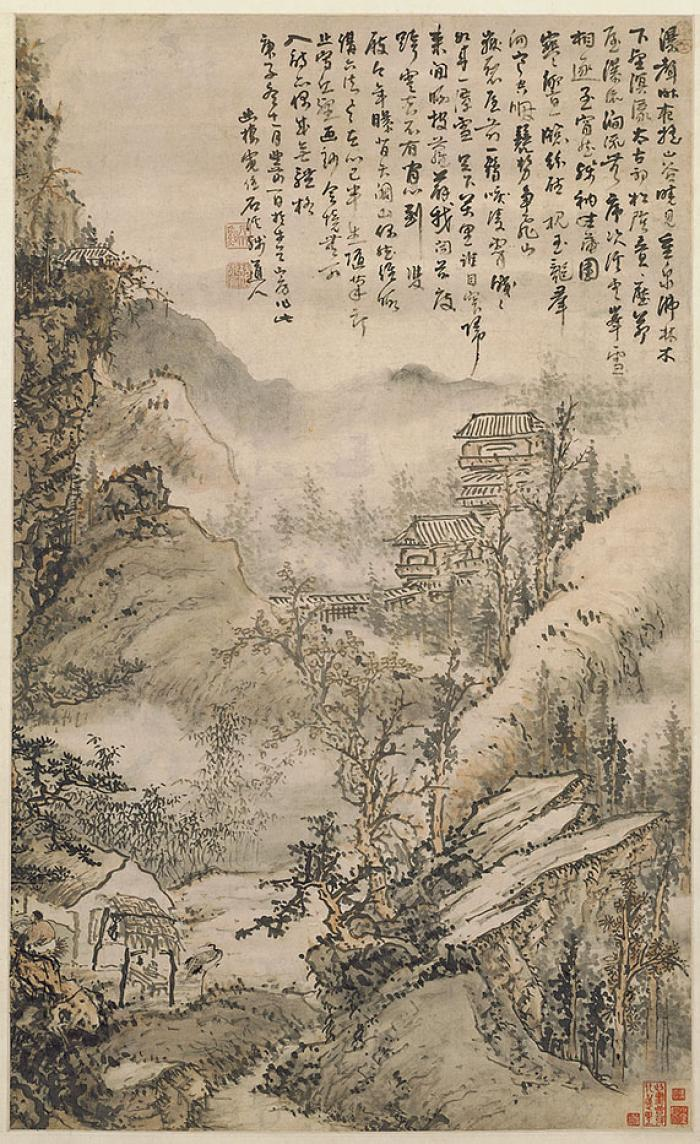
Kuncan, Landscape after Night Rain Shower, (China, Qing Dynasty), 1660, Palace Museum, Beijing.

The three perfections (Chinese: 三絕; pinyin: sānjué) is a term referring to Chinese poetry, painting, and calligraphy understood and practiced as related endeavors.

The earliest recorded mention known of "the three perfections" is found in The New Book of Tang, where the term is used to describe the work of poet-painter Zheng Qian, who, as described by calligrapher Qi Gong, "excelled in poetry, calligraphy, and painting."

Legend holds that the Tang dynasty poets Du Fu and Li Bai were the first to introduce the combination of painting and poetry into one artwork. Several hundred years later, Su Shi, a poet and painter, promoted the use of poetry and painting together. Instruction of artists at the Northern Song Imperial Painting Academy included the integration of poetry and painting.

== Examples ==
- Anchorage on a Rainy Night, Shen Zhou, Chinese, 1427–1509
- Illustration to the Second Prose Poem on the Red Cliff, Qiao Zhongchang, Chinese, late 11th or early 12th century
- Landscape after Li Bo's poem, Ike Taiga, Japanese, Edo period, 18th century

== Gallery ==
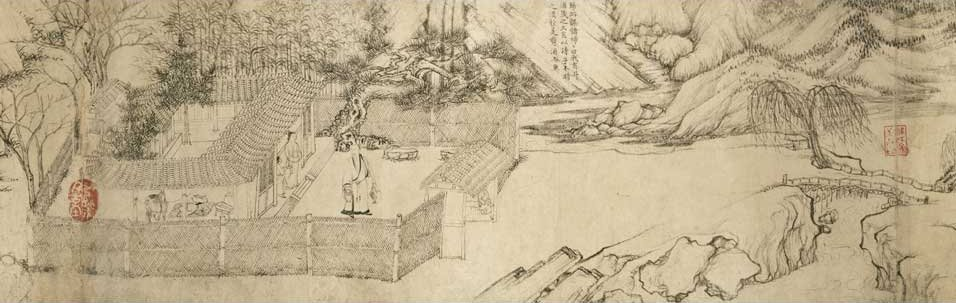
Qiao Zhongchang, Illustration to the Second Prose Poem on the Red Cliff, late 11th or early 12th century, Nelson-Atkins Museum of Art

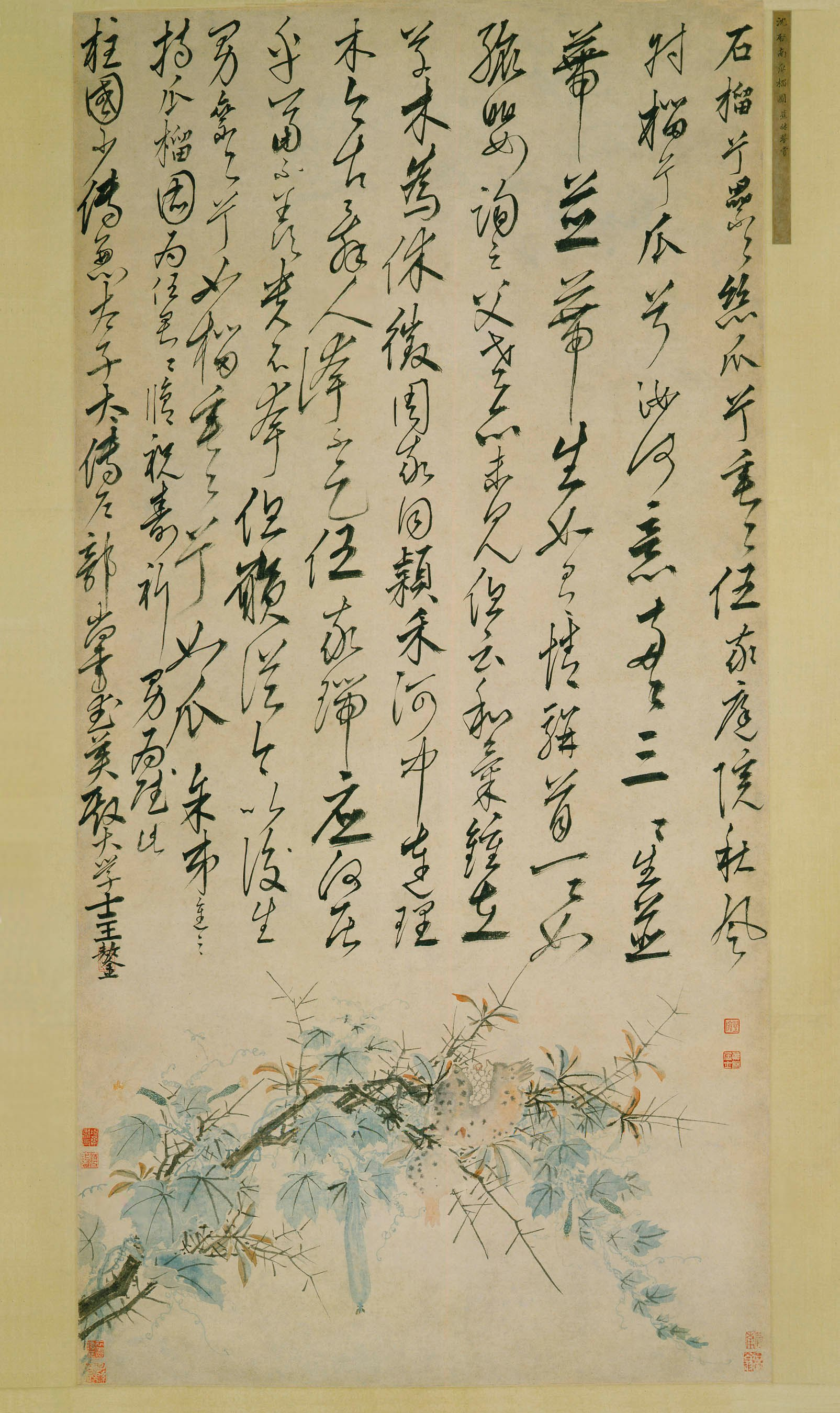
Shen Zhou (painting) and Wang Ao (poem), Ode to Pomegranate and Melon Vine, c. 1506–09, Detroit Institute of Arts
