= Aesthetic interpretation =

Explanation of the meaning of a work of art

In the philosophy of art, an interpretation is an explanation of the meaning of a work of art. (Note: In Our Mutual Friend (1864–1865), Book 3, Chapter 10, Charles Dickens gives as examples "[a}n actress's Reading of a chambermaid, a dancer's Reading of a hornpipe, a singer's Reading of a song, a marine painter's Reading of the sea, the kettle-drum's Reading of an instrumental passage".) An aesthetic interpretation expresses a particular emotional or experiential understanding most often used in reference to a poem or piece of literature, and may also apply to a work of visual art or performance.

In the early 20th century, the German philosopher Martin Heidegger explored questions of formal philosophical analysis versus personal interpretations of aesthetic experience, favoring the direct subjective experience of a work of art as essential to an individual's aesthetic interpretation.

== See also ==
- Against Interpretation
- Representation (arts)
