= Aesthetics of science =

Branch of philosophy

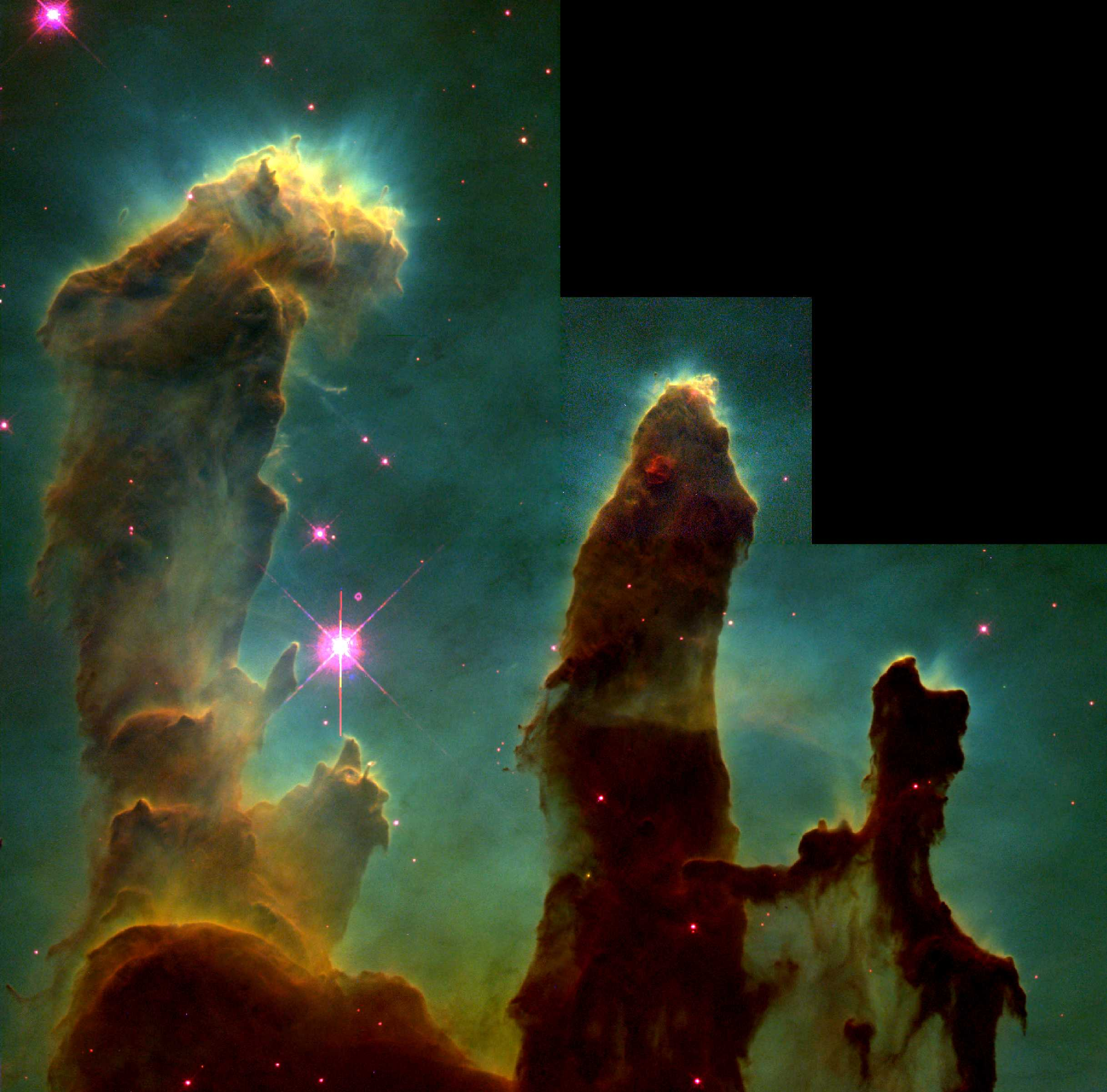
The Pillars of Creation, photographed by the Hubble Space Telescope in the Eagle Nebula, provide an oft-cited example of aesthetic appeal in astronomical discovery.

Aesthetics of science is the study of beauty and matters of taste within the scientific endeavour. Aesthetic features like simplicity, elegance and symmetry are sources of wonder and awe for many scientists, thus motivating scientific pursuit. Conversely, theories that have been empirically successful may be judged to lack aesthetic merit, which contributes to the desire to find a new theory that subsumes the old.

The topic has been addressed by several publications discussing how aesthetic values are related to scientific experiments and theories.

== See also ==
- Aesthetics
- Mathematical beauty
