= Mary Mothersill =

Canadian philosopher (1923–2008)

- Born: 1923; Edmonton, Alberta, Canada
- Died: January 22, 2008 (aged 84–85); New York City, U.S.
- Awards: American Academy of Arts and Sciences

Academic background
- Education: University of Toronto; Radcliffe College; Harvard University

Academic work
- Discipline: Philosophy
- Institutions: Vassar College; Columbia University; University of Connecticut; University of Michigan; University of Chicago; City College of New York; Columbia University
- Notable works: Beauty Restored

Mary Mothersill (1923 – 22 January 2008) was a Canadian philosopher.

== Life ==
Mary Mothersill gained a BA in English from the University of Toronto in 1944, a master's degree in philosophy from Radcliffe College in 1945, and in 1954 a PhD from Harvard University, for a dissertation entitled Lewis and Stevenson: A Critical Comparison of Two Theories of Value, relating to the work of Clarence I. Lewis and Charles L. Stevenson.

After teaching at Vassar College (1947–51), and at Columbia University, the University of Connecticut, the University of Michigan, the University of Chicago, and City College of New York, she joined the faculty of Columbia University's women's undergraduate college, Barnard College, teaching there and at the Columbia Graduate School of Arts and Sciences from 1963 until her retirement in 1993.

Mothersill, early in her career, published on metaethics, moral knowledge, the nature of art and criticism, death, feminism, pornography, and other topics. Her Beauty Restored (Oxford: Clarendon Press, 1984) is widely regarded as a central text in the literature on aesthetics.

In 2003 Mary Mothersill was elected to the American Academy of Arts and Sciences. In 1986 she was a visiting fellow at Wolfson College, Oxford, and she was later Alfred North Whitehead lecturer at Harvard University.
