= Aesthetic taste =

Personal and cultural pattern of choice and preference

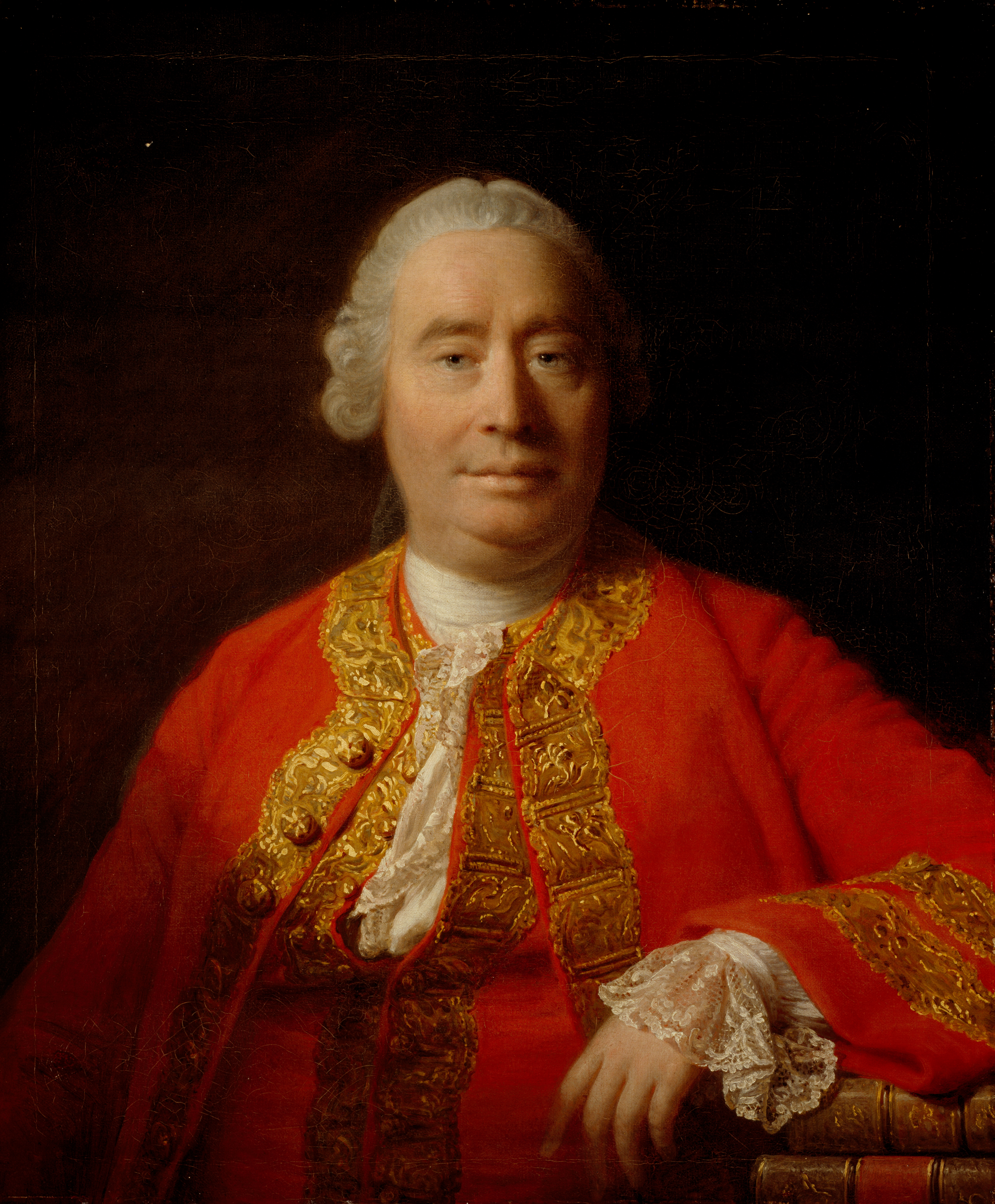
Philosopher David Hume was one of the earliest writers to investigate "good taste" in regards to aesthetic principles. His publication “Of the Standard of Taste” (1757) investigates aesthetics.

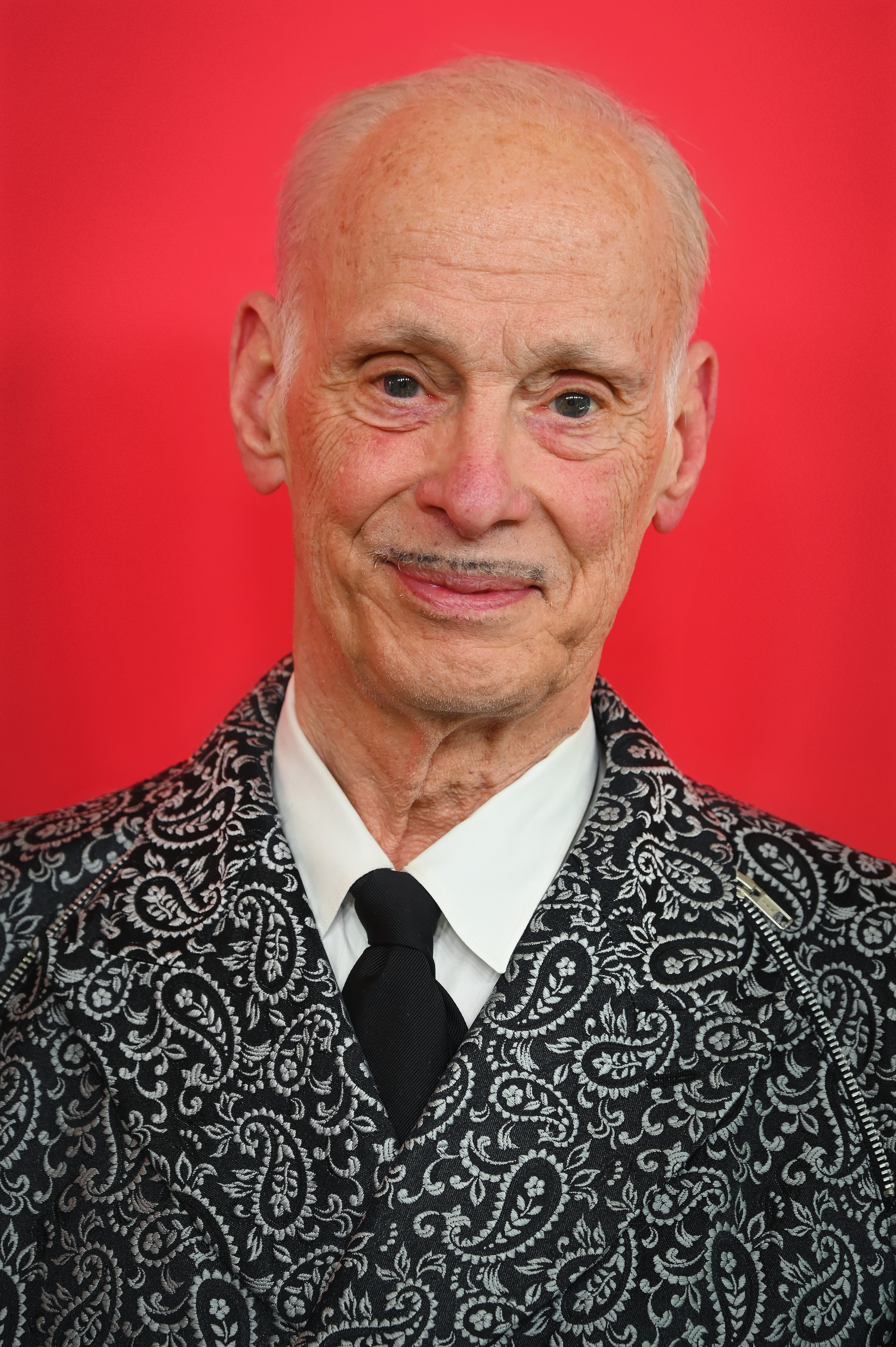
Filmmaker John Waters, whose films challenge traditional aesthetics of "good taste", once stated “to understand bad taste one must have very good taste.”

In aesthetics, the concept of taste has been the interest of philosophers such as Plato, Hume, and Kant. It is defined by the ability to make valid judgments about an object's aesthetic value. However, these judgments are deficient in objectivity, creating the 'paradox of taste'. The term 'taste' is used because these judgments are similarly made when one physically tastes food.

== Hume, Kant and Bourdieu ==
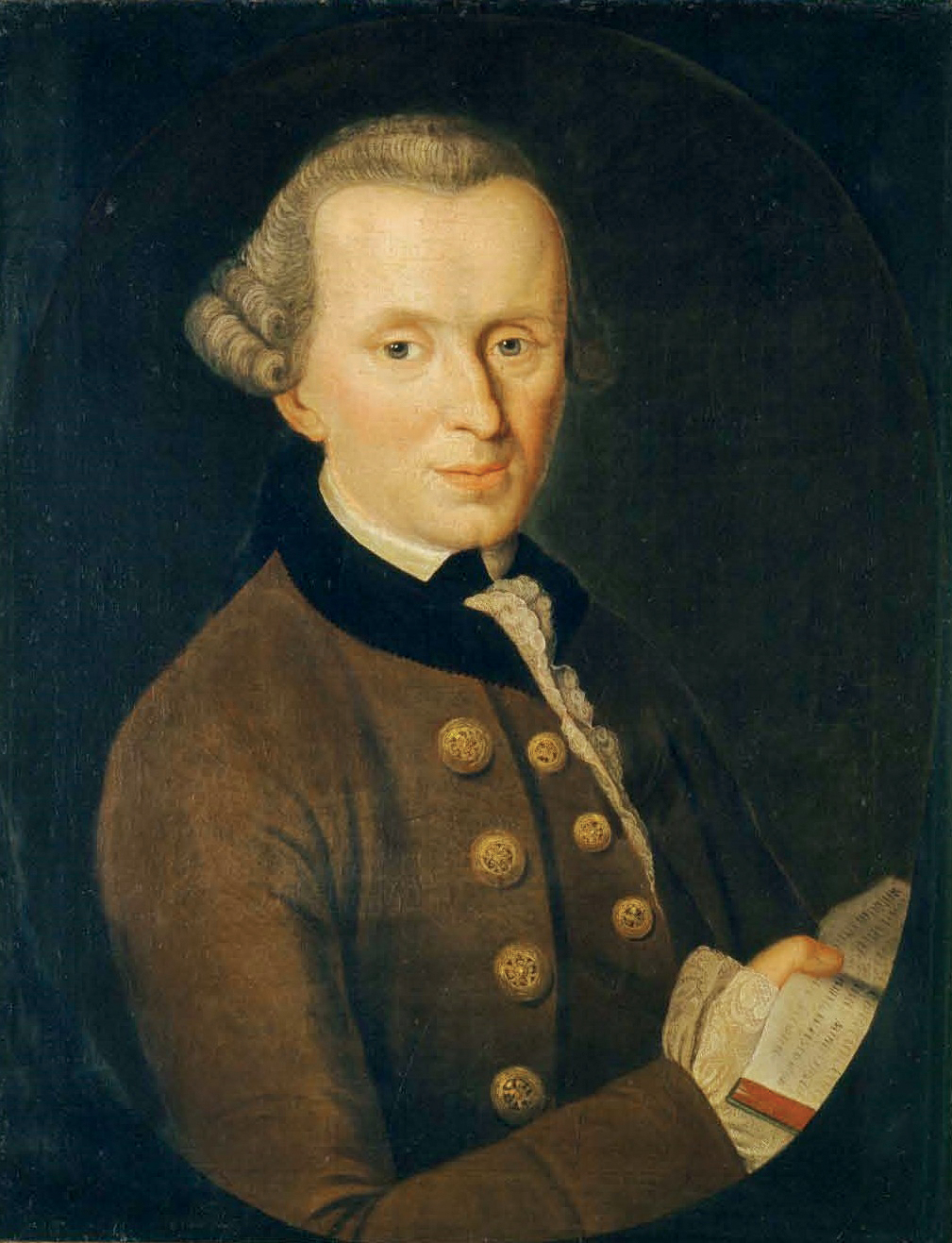
For Kant, beauty is not a property of any object, but an aesthetic judgement based on a subjective feeling.

David Hume addressed the subject of aesthetic taste in an essay entitled “Of the Standard of Taste”, one of four essays published in his Four Dissertations in 1757. "Of the Standard of Taste" is highly regarded for its insights into aesthetics. While Hume is generally seen as an empiricist, in matters of taste, he can be classified as an ideal observer theorist, allowing for individual and cultural preferences. Hume distinguishes between sentiments, always correct as they reference only themselves, and determinations, which can be incorrect as they refer to something beyond. Beauty, for Hume, is "no quality in things themselves: It exists merely in the mind which contemplates them; and each mind perceives a different beauty". This, according to Hume, makes judgments of beauty and taste sentiments rather than determinations.

Hume argues that beauty lies in the mind, not the object, and opinions about beauty are influenced by cultural conventions, subject to change. He introduces the concept of a true judge, an individual with "strong sense, united to delicate sentiment, improved by practice, perfected by comparison, and cleared of all prejudice." The combined opinions of these rare individuals form the standard of taste, existing within them. This standard is not to be confused with contemporary art critics; the true judge does not apply a standard to objects but possesses ideal perception, enhancing their ability to appreciate beauty. Hume suggests that improving perception leads to better taste.

For Immanuel Kant, as discussed in his Critique of Judgment, beauty is not a property of any object, but an aesthetic judgement based on a subjective feeling. He claims that a genuine good taste does exist, though it could not be empirically identified. The validity of a judgement is not to be ascertained by means of the general view of the majority or some specific social group because taste is both personal and beyond reasoning. Nonetheless, Kant stresses that our preferences, even on generally liked things, do not justify the objectivity of our judgements.

Bourdieu argued against the Kantian view of pure aesthetics, stating that the legitimate taste of the society is the taste of the ruling class. This position also rejects the idea of genuine good taste, as the legitimate taste is merely a class taste. This idea was also proposed by Simmel, who noted that the upper classes abandon fashions as they are adopted by lower ones.

== Bad taste ==
Bad taste (also poor taste or vulgarity) is generally used to deride individuals with 'poor' aesthetic judgment. Bad taste can become a respected and cultivated (if perhaps defiant and belligerent) aesthetic, for example in the works of filmmaker John Waters, sculptor Jeff Koons, or the popular McMansion style of architecture.

A contemporary view—a retrospective review of literature—is that "a good deal of dramatic verse written during the Elizabethan and Jacobean periods is in poor taste because it is bombast [high-sounding language with little meaning]".

Grayck argues that individuals can only be judged as having poor taste if their tastes are informed by the aesthetics education they received.

== See also ==
- Aesthetics
- Artistic merit
- Camp (style)
- Censorship
- Fashion
- Highbrow
- Kitsch
- Low culture
- Style (visual arts)
- Subjectivism
- Western canon
