= Aesthetic absolutism =

Absolutism, in aesthetics, is a term applied to several theories of aesthetics with the same inherent approach. This being that beauty is an objective attribute of things, and not merely a subjective feeling of pleasure to the one who perceives it. It follows from this that there is an absolute standard of the beautiful by which all objects can be judged. The fact that, in practice, the judgments even of connoisseurs are perpetually at variance, and that the so-called criteria of one place or period are more or less opposed to those of all others, is explained by the hypothesis that individuals are differently gifted in respect of the capacity to appreciate.

== Definitions ==
James O. Young, of the University of Victoria, suggests that aesthetic absolutism can be defined as "Aesthetic propositions which only become true if, and only if, the proposition is a matter of fact, by virtue of the judgement being related to the art itself." Aesthetic absolutism can, in this sense, be applied to any object that can be considered a work of art, so long as the object meets the condition of being capable of an aesthetic judgement that is either ontologically true or false in nature.

Within philosophical logic, the application of aesthetic absolutism within a truth-value system can be understood as attempting to describe the nature of art through the perspective of faultless disagreement. For example, regardless of whether statements A and not-A differ in regards to the substance of an object, they can simultaneously be true judgements at the same time. David Malet Armstrong and others note that the underlying principle behind these truth judgements can be derived from the truthmaker theory, in that the ontological grounding for relations between objects within truth-judgements exists as such. In a simplified form, absolutism implies that the correlative nature between an aesthetic object and objective beauty exists in one, static state.

== See also ==
- Aesthetic relativism
- Metaphysical aesthetics
