= Point of view (philosophy) =

Concept of personal perspective in philosophy

In philosophy, a point of view is a specific attitude or manner through which a person thinks about something. This figurative usage of the expression dates back to 1730. In this meaning, the usage is synonymous with one of the meanings of the term perspective (also epistemic perspective).

The concept of the "point of view" is highly multifunctional and ambiguous. Many things may be judged from certain personal, traditional or moral points of view (as in "beauty is in the eye of the beholder"). Our knowledge about reality is often relative to a certain point of view.

Vázquez Campos and Manuel Liz Gutierrez suggested to analyse the concept of "point of view" using two approaches: one based on the concept of "propositional attitudes", the other on the concepts of "location" and "access".

== Analysis ==
Margarita Vázquez Campos and Antonio Manuel Liz Gutiérrez in their work, "The Notion of Point of View", give a comprehensive analysis of the structure of the concept. They point out that despite being crucial in many discourses, the notion has not been adequately analyzed, though some important works do exist. They mention that early classical Greek philosophers, starting from Parmenides and Heraclitus discussed the relation between "appearance" and reality, i.e., how our points of view are connected with reality. They specifically point out Ludwig Wittgenstein's Tractatus Logico-Philosophicus. They consider Wittgenstein's theory of "pictures" or "models" (Wittgenstein used the German word Bild, which means both "picture" and "model") as an illustration of the relationship between points of view and reality.

=== Propositional attitudes ===
The internal structure of a point of view may be analysed similarly to the concept of a propositional attitude. A propositional attitude is an attitude, i.e., a mental state held by an agent toward a proposition. Examples of such attitudes are "to believe in something", "to desire something", "to guess something", "to remember something", etc. Vazques Campos and Gutierrez suggest that points of view may be analyzed as structured sets of propositional attitudes. The authors draw on Christopher Peacocke's Sense and Content.

Within this approach one may carry out ontological classification of various distinctions, such as individual vs. collective points of view, personal vs. non-personal, non-conceptual vs. conceptual, etc.

=== Location and access ===
Whereas propositional attitudes approach to analyze points of view internally, the "location/access" approach analyzes points of view externally, by their role. The term "access" refers to the statement of Liz Gutierrez that "points of views, or perspectives, are ways of having access to the world and to ourselves", and the term "location" is in reference to the provided quotation of Jon Moline that points of view are "ways of viewing things and events from certain locations". Moline rejects the notion that points of view are reducible to some rules based on some theories, maxims or dogmas. Moline considers the concept of "location" in two ways: in a direct way as a vantage point, and in an extended way, the way how a given vantage point provides a perspective, i.e., influences the perception.

This approach may address epistemological issues, such as relativism, existence of the absolute point of view, compatibility of points of view (including "faultless disagreement"), possibility of a point of view without a bearer, etc.

== See also ==
- Anekantavada – Jain doctrine of many-sidedness
- Paradigm – Set of distinct concepts or thought patterns
- Perspectivism – Philosophical principle that perspectives and epistemology are always linked
- Reality tunnel – Theory of personal perception
- Umwelt – The world as it appears through a species's perceptual systems
- Worldview – Fundamental cognitive orientation of an individual or society
- Value system – Personal value, basis for ethical action
- Viewpoint discrimination – Discrimination based on point of view
