= Aesthetic relativism =

Aesthetic relativism is the idea that views of beauty are relative to differences in perception and consideration, and intrinsically, have no absolute truth or validity.

== Context ==
Aesthetic relativism might be regarded as a sub-set of an overall philosophical relativism, which denies any absolute standards of truth or morality as well as of aesthetic judgement. (A frequently-cited source for philosophical relativism in postmodern theory is a fragment by Nietzsche, entitled "On Truth and Lie in an Extra-Moral Sense".)

Aesthetic relativism is a variety of the philosophy known generally as relativism, which casts doubt on the possibility of direct epistemic access to the "external world", and which therefore rejects the positive claim that statements made about the external world can be known to be objectively true. Other varieties of relativism include cognitive relativism (the general claim that all truth and knowledge is relative) and ethical relativism (the claim that moral judgements are relative). Aesthetic and ethical relativism are sub-categories of cognitive relativism.

== Categories ==
Aesthetic relativism takes two major forms: aesthetic subjectivism and aesthetic perspectivism.

== Adherents ==
Philosophers who have been influential in relativist thinking include David Hume, particularly his "radical scepticism" as set out in A Treatise of Human Nature; Thomas Kuhn, with regard to the history and philosophy of science, and particularly his work The Structure of Scientific Revolutions; Friedrich Nietzsche, in moral philosophy and epistemology; and Richard Rorty, on the contingency of language.

Philosophers who have given influential objectivist accounts include Plato, and in particular his Theory of the Forms; Immanuel Kant, who argued that the judgement of beauty, despite being subjective, is a universally practiced function of the mind; Noam Chomsky, whose "nativist" theory of linguistics argues for a universal grammar (i.e., that language is not as contingent as relativists have argued that it is).

The most prominent philosophical opponent of aesthetic relativism was Immanuel Kant, who argued that the judgement of beauty, while subjective, is universal.

== See also ==
- Aesthetic absolutism
