= Metaphysical aesthetics =

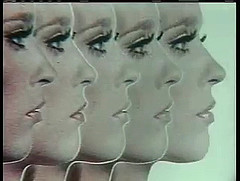
Replica of a woman with slight variations within each new image of her

Metaphysical concepts relate to the ideas of transcendent and universal elements that surpass the human interactions. They aim to explore notions that humans have yet to comprehend, or have merely touched on in order to provide an understanding of what lies beyond the physical world. Aesthetics aims to explore questions relating to the natural world, beauty and art, and the intertwining of each. Therefore, in conjunction with metaphysical concepts, these two branches of philosophy explore the transformative and distinctiveness of art and what distinguishes something as art. These ideas highly conflicted with modern scientific knowledge as they were based on theories and concepts in comparison to reliable experiments that resulted in tangible or viewable proof. In relation to naturalism many philosophers such as John Dewey, Ernest Nagel and Sidney Hook are compelled to believe that only what is seen and touched or scientifically proven can be true, and in saying so, can be meaningful to humans.

== What is Art? ==
Aesthetics arises when one's own definition of beauty is led to the question of, what is art? Similar to one's pondering of metaphysical thoughts in which lead to the notions of, 'what is?,' aesthetics allows one to explore the distinctiveness of what makes a form of work classified as art.

Art can be seen or heard through forms such as music, architecture, paintings, literature, plays and so forth. However, many critics state that humans are too caught up in works of statutes, song and dance to ever notice what lies beyond the surface of this diversity, the one identical reality: art. Works of stone altars from the third, second and first B.C. of Italian origin are often established as 'a work of art,' however, in stating this, one employs the idea of art in a contemporary society. Two conclusions are drawn from this in which concern the character of art and the nature of the theory of art. The artists naïveté in their piece is essential in classifying the finished work as 'art.' An artist cannot begin a work with the intention of it being art, nor can the artist determine whether the completed work is art, it must earn a social prestige from the population. Once the artwork has been recognised as art, the artist can no longer approach their work naively as they are aware of its significance. An artist is unable to begin a piece with the intention of creating art as they lose the indelible feature of art, naïveté. In other terms, intellectual clarification and artistic creation proceed on two different planes of mental activity, in general one would link action with intellect. As Helmut Kuhn writes, in this case, the artist's heart is wiser than the mind, therefore, they must relinquish this state of mind in order to not define the directing purpose of the piece.

=== Plato's Theory: Art is Imitation (Mimesis) ===
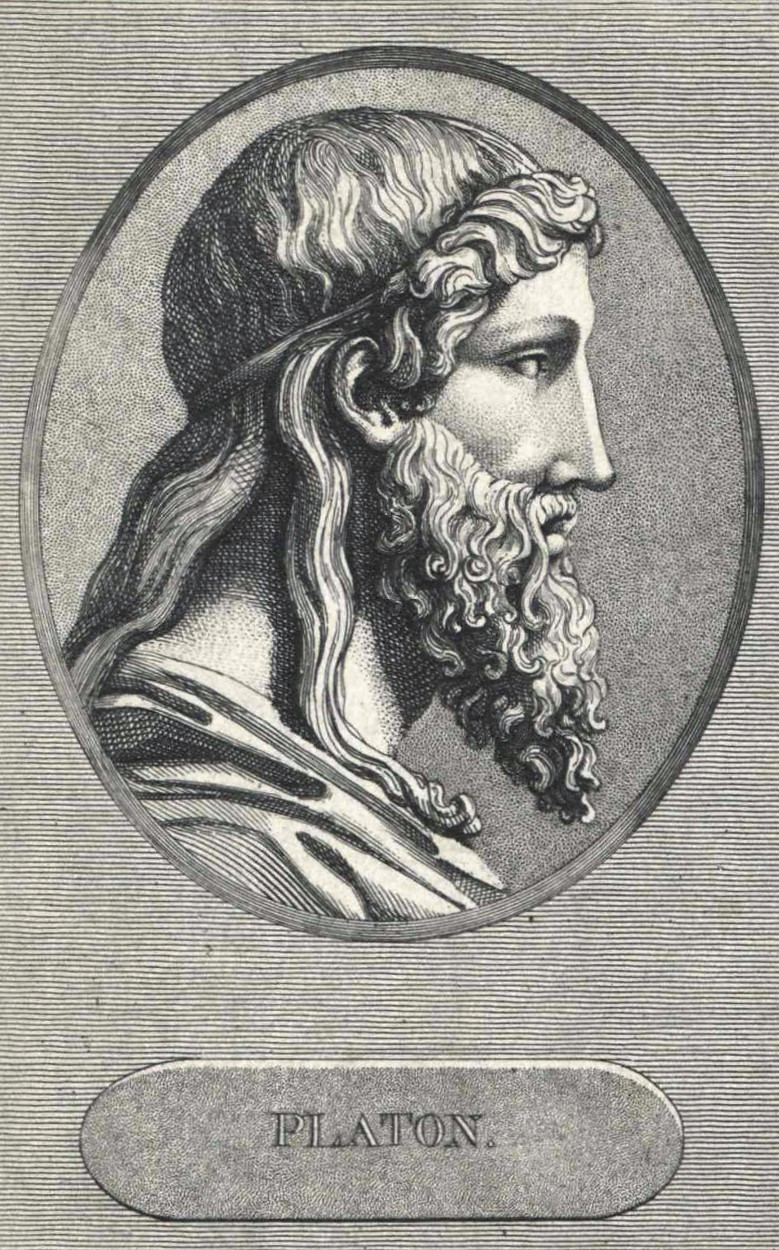
17th-century image of Plato

The idea of art being an imitation was present during the Renaissance when Vasari had said, "painting is just the imitation of all the living things of nature with their colours and designs just as they are in nature." However, Plato's theories on this topic further explored the idea that art imitates the objects and events of ordinary life. In other words, it is a copy of a copy of a form. Therefore, works of art are either for the joy of entertainment or an illusion. Contrastingly, Plato's other theory talks about how an artist may have the power to create an artwork truer than the copies of the form. In works with Socrates, the pair discovered the idea that one may be called upon by a higher, divine power, and is gifted with the ability to create art. This was established in Socrates questioning of a poet named, Ion. Ion was able to recite the poems of Homer, however could not recite anything else. Socrates questioned this as, logically thinking, if Ion is able to recite poetry, then this knowledge should be applicable towards all forms of poetry. Therefore, Socrates classified the notion as inspiration from the Gods who allowed Ion to only recite Homeric poetry. Plato was not entirely convinced of this idea of an artist being divinely inspired, however, this theory has become evident in the present day and is believed by many individuals.

=== Faults in Plato's Theory: Art is Imitation ===
Although Plato's theory is plausible for works of paintings, sculpture and drawings, it does not account or give reason for other forms of artworks. The art of music does not apply to the idea of imitation as it is originally created by the artist. However, Plato spoke about music being an imitation of ones emotions and being a way of representing natural sounds, yet many believe this to be a far stretch in his theory. Plato's theory of Imitation only began to fade during the nineteenth century, where imitation began to fade from western aesthetics to theories of art being a form of expression and communication of ones emotions or aesthetic needs.

=== Aristotle ===
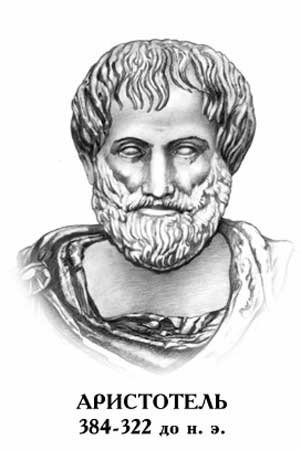
An image of Aristotle

Aristotle has similar beliefs in Plato's theory of imitation, however, the difference between them was Aristotle's belief in the, 'unmoved Mover,' which is pure Form, whilst Plato believed that Forms were the true reality and that the world were copies of them. Aristotle similarly believed that art involved imitation, thinking more in depth as to what form of art people decide to imitate. For instance, Aristotle stated that Tragedy is an imitation, "not of persons but of action and life, of happiness and misery." An aspect Aristotle had developed was his theory of catharsis, an aspect that Plato has rejected. Catharsis, or in other words, purging of the emotions "through pity and fear," is accomplished by tragedy. Drama, specifically tragedy, is explored in Aristotle's Poetics or 'Unities.' The Poetics explains both a history and a critical framework for the evaluation for tragic drama. This particular work was influential during the Renaissance and the early modern European periods, however, still has had a strong influence up to the present day. Aristotle distinguished six elements of a tragic drama: Spectacle, which refers to the staging, sets, lighting and costumes. Thought is in reference to what the characters are thinking. Diction and Melody refers to the style and setting of text or, in the case of some, the lyrics and music. Plot and Character are the two that Aristotle thought to be the most important. He stated, "In a play, they do not act in order to portray the characters; they include the characters for the sake of the action." (poetics 1450.20) With these elements, Aristotle stressed the need for a work to be unified. That the plot should portray one extended action which comes to a climatic conclusion and results in catharsis. However, in saying this, Aristotle also implied that there must be an element of surprise, that the plot should have twists and turns in order to arouse the audience's emotions. A sense of authenticity must also be present, specifically where the character themselves react in ways one normally would in specific circumstances. These 'Unities' were developed by Renaissance writers who produced a code of 'decorum' for dramatic productions. The failure to showcase these 'Unities' often resulted in the work being classified as a failure. However, productions and showcases of tragedy drama no longer comply to these elements intentionally, yet are only present in an unconscious sense where what the artist creates reflects Aristotle's theory.

== History ==
=== Henri Bergson ===
In 1896, Henri Bergson published his book on philosophy titled, Matière et Mémoire. In this publication, Bergson positioned himself as a Spirit-Matter dualist in ontology and developed an epistemology that distinguished between intuition. This led to absolute knowledge of the Spiritual Realm, and an analysis that led to relative knowledge of the Material Realm. Bergson had developed a theory of the comic within relation to his ontology and epistemology in his work published in 1900 titled, Le Rire. For example, he claimed that laughter comes into being when men silence their emotions and call nothing into play but their intelligence. He uses as an example, when a man stumbles and falls, the passers-by laugh; however, they would not of laughed had he of chosen to sit down, instead they laugh because his sitting down is involuntary. This was in relation to the Material Realm, however knowledge of the Spiritual Realm was contrasted with the experience of the beautiful and the tragic. For instance, Bergson states that we are able to imitate the hero of a tragedy, however, the question arises whether this imitation is consequently passed from the tragic to a comic.

=== Benedetto Croce ===
Benedetto Croce believed that aesthetic activity was an essential activity of the mind. Specifically, the aesthetics activity, which involved the use of imagination, was what other mental activities such as action or logical thought, were founded. In Croce's Preface to the 1902 edition of Aesthetics he states that aesthetics is essential and a study prior to metaphysics. Croce believe that a cogent analysis of aesthetics is not only important within itself but is also important because it brings light to the faults in other branches of philosophy. He suggested a dualistic ontology of Spirit and Nature and analysed aesthetics activity within the context of a realist metaphysics that distinguished between the Subject and the Natural world. However, through deeper analysis, Croce rejected the Spirit-Nature theory and claimed a Spiritual Monism. Croce therefore stated that aesthetics is a corrective to metaphysics.

=== John Dewey ===
John Dewey has proposed a monistic ontology, identifying experience and nature, calling this a "naturalistic metaphysics." He rejected ontological dualisms that separated experience and the natural world. In his published book, Experience and Nature, Dewey states that scientific and artistic experience are one of the same. Science was an art, and together, they combined the cognitive and the emotive senses. In his work, Dewey suggests that art is a combination of the culminating event of nature and the climax of experience. In 1934, his published work, Art as Experience, expands on this theory. Dewey's main concern was to make clear that objects of art did not differ from ordinary objects, nor did aesthetic experience differ from ordinary experience.

=== R.G. Collingwood ===
R. G. Collingwood suggested in his published work title, The Principles of Art, that the theory of art was developed upon the theory of the world. Collingwood states in his work that art is imaginary by using the example that if one creates music based on their imagination then a tune is an imaginary thing. His theory suggests that there are no real objects, they are created through each individual's imagination, constructing an idea of an object. Therefore, the existence of these objects is only due to an imagination that identifies and distinguishes things out of momentary sensation. Consequently, since objects are founded upon the imagination, then artwork does likewise. As stated in, The Principles of Art, art is created as a result of human emotions, which in turn comes from an imaginary experience or activity.

== See also ==
- Aesthetics
- Metaphysics

== Bibliography ==
- Adam, Betty Conrad (1983). The re-emergence of metaphysical aesthetics (Thesis). hdl:1911/19044.
- "Aesthetics - Plato's Aesthetics". users.rowan.edu, 2019, http://users.rowan.edu/~clowney/Aesthetics/philos_artists_onart/aristotle.htm [Accessed on: 12 May 2019]
- Pearson, Keith Ansell; Maoilearca, John Ó (2002). Henri Bergson: Key Writings. A&C Black. ISBN 978-1-4411-5310-4.
- "ARISTOTLE's AESTHETICS". users.rowan.edu, 2019, http://users.rowan.edu/~clowney/Aesthetics/philos_artists_onart/aristotle.htm [Accessed on: 12 May 2019]
- Barnard, G. William (2012). Living Consciousness: The Metaphysical Vision of Henri Bergson. State University of New York Press. ISBN 978-1-4384-3959-4.
- Perri, Trevor (2017). "Henri Bergson". In Bernecker, Sven; Michaelian, Kourken (eds.). The Routledge Handbook of Philosophy of Memory. pp. 510–518. doi:10.4324/9781315687315-43. ISBN 978-1-315-68731-5.
- Bergson, Henri. "Laughter: An Essay On The Meaning of The Comic: Henri Bergson." Internet Archive , 1911, https://archive.org/details/laughteranessay00berggoog/page/n22 [Accessed on: 24 May 2019]
- Collingwood, R. G. "The Principles of Art." The Clarendon Press.Oxford. University Liberey Allahabad, 2016. https://archive.org/details/in.ernet.dli.2015.188470/page/n149 [Accessed on 25 May 2019].
- Dewey, John. "Experience and Nature." George Allen and Unwin Osmania University, 1929. https://archive.org/details/experienceandnat029343mbp/page/n29 [Accessed on: 24 May 2019]
- Counterbalance Foundation (1995). "Metaphysical". Faith and Reason Glossary. PBS.
- Kuhn, Helmut (1950). "On the Indispensability of Metaphysical Principles in Aesthetics". The Journal of Aesthetics and Art Criticism. 9 (2): 128–133. doi:10.2307/426332. JSTOR 426332.
- Winfield, Richard Dien (1994). "The individuality of art and the collapse of metaphysical aesthetics". American Philosophical Quarterly. 31 (1): 39–52. JSTOR 20014482. Gale A14972410 INIST 4279076.
