= Berys Gaut =

British author

Berys Gaut is an author and Professor of Philosophy at the University of St Andrews. He writes on aesthetics, creativity, philosophy of film, and ethics. He was president of the British Society of Aesthetics until 2018.

== Works ==
Gaut has written two monographs, numerous articles in peer-reviewed journals, contributed many chapters to edited volumes and edited several books. In Art, Emotion and Ethics (2007) he explores the connection between aesthetics and ethics. In A Philosophy of Cinematic Art (2010) many of his previously published papers on cinema are collected. He has edited several books including The Routledge Companion to Aesthetics, together with Dominic McIver Lopes (first edition 2001), The Creation of Art: New Essays in Philosophical Aesthetics, together with Paisley Livingston (2003) and Creativity and Philosophy, together with Matthew Kieran (2018). He has co-authored Philosophy for Young Children: A Practical Guide (2011) with primary school teacher Morag Gaut.

=== Monographs ===
- Art, Emotion and Ethics, Oxford University Press, 2007.
- A Philosophy of Cinematic Art, Cambridge University Press, 2010.

=== Edited books ===
- Ethics and Practical Reason, co-edited with Garrett Cullity, Oxford University Press,1997.
- The Routledge Companion to Aesthetics, co-edited with Dominic McIver Lopes, Routledge, 2001. Second edition, 2005. Third edition, 2013.
- The Creation of Art: New Essays in Philosophical Aesthetics, co-edited with Paisley Livingston, Cambridge University Press, 2003.
- Creativity and Philosophy, co-edited with Matthew Kieran, Routledge, 2018.

=== Recent articles ===
- "The Philosophy of Creativity", Philosophy Compass 5 (12), 2010, pp. 1034–46.
- "Film and Language" in Patrick Hogan (ed.), The Cambridge Encyclopedia of the Language Sciences, Cambridge University Press, 2010, pp. 310–11.
- "Telling Stories: Narration, Emotion, and Insight in Memento" in Noel Carroll and John Gibson (eds), Narrative, Emotion, and Insight, Penn State University Press, 2011, pp. 23–44.
- "A Philosophy of Cinematic Art--The Big Picture" and "Replies to Ponech, Curran, and Allen", British Journal of Aesthetics, 52 (2), 2012, pp. 183–6 and 201-8.
- "Creativity and Rationality", Journal of Aesthetics and Art Criticism, 70 (3) 2012, pp. 259–70.
- "Teaching Philosophy to Young Children" in Sara Goering, Nicholas J. Shudak and Thomas E. Wartenberg (eds.), Philosophy in Schools: An Introduction for Philosophers and Teachers, Routledge, 2013, pp. 132–40; co-authored with Morag Gaut.
- "Mixed Motivations: Creativity as a Virtue", Philosophical Aesthetics and the Sciences of Art: Royal Institute of Philosophy Supplement, 75, 2014, pp. 183–202.
- "Educating for Creativity" in Elliot Samuel Paul and Scott Barry Kaufman (eds.), The Philosophy of Creativity: New Essays, Oxford University Press, 2014, pp. 265–87.
- "Creativity", "The Intentional Fallacy", "Fiction and Non-fiction", "Depiction" and "Consequentialism", entries in Robert Audi (ed)., The Cambridge Dictionary of Philosophy, 3rd ed., Cambridge University Press, 2015.
- "Elegy in L.A.: Blade Runner, Empathy and Death" in Amy Coplan and David Davies (eds.), Blade Runner, Routledge, 2015, pp. 31–45.
- "Cinematic Art and Technology" in Katherine Thomson-Jones (ed.), Current Controversies in the Philosophy of Film, Routledge, 2016, pp. 17–35.
- "The Value of Creativity" in Berys Gaut and Matthew Kieran (eds.), Creativity and Philosophy, Routledge, 2018.
- "Philosophising about Creativity", co-authored with Matthew Kieran, in Berys Gaut and Matthew Kieran (eds.), Creativity and Philosophy, Routledge, 2018.
