= Formal balance =

Formal balance, also called symmetrical balance, is a concept of aesthetic composition involving equal weight and importance on both sides of a composition.
