= Katharine Gilbert =

American philosopher

Katharine Everett Gilbert (1886–1952) was an American philosopher who specialized in aesthetics and the philosophy of art. She was a founding trustee of the American Society for Aesthetics as well as its first woman president. Gilbert was also one of the first women to be president of a division of the American Philosophical Association. She was the first female professor at Duke University and, during her lifetime, the only female chairman of a liberal arts department.

She published four books on her studies, Maurice Blondel's Philosophy of Action (1924); Studies in Recent Aesthetics (1927); with Helmut Kuhn, A History of Aesthetics (1939); and Aesthetic Studies: Architecture and Poetry (1952). She was awarded an Honorary Doctor of Letters degree by Brown University in 1942.

== Education ==
Gilbert started her schooling by attending local schools in her hometown of Newport, Rhode Island, before attending Brown University beginning in 1904. She graduated with a Bachelor of Arts degree in 1908 and a Master of Arts in 1910. While in her master's program she assisted Alexander Meiklejohn and Walter Goodnow Everett in philosophy. She then moved to Cornell University to continue her graduate studies as a scholar and fellow of the Sage School of Philosophy, becoming a Doctor of Philosophy in 1912.

== Career ==
After school, Gilbert became the assistant of the editor of the Philosophical Review at Cornell, James E. Creighton. Between 1922 and 1929, she worked at the University of North Carolina at Chapel Hill as a Kenan Research Fellow in Philosophy. At the end of her fellowship she also worked as an acting professor of philosophy. In 1930 she was appointed professor of philosophy at Duke University. By 1942, she was named the head of the Department of Aesthetics, Art, & Music which had recently been established.

== Awards and accomplishments ==
Gilbert became the first woman to be a full-time professor as well as being the only woman to hold the chairmanship of a liberal arts department at Duke during her life. She was also involved in inaugurating the Chamber Arts Society, and received an honorary doctor of letters degree by Brown University. Katherine worked her way up in the American Philosophical Society and was ultimately elected president. This made her one of the three women until that point to hold the office. She was involved in the International Spinoza Society, the Southern Philosophical and Psychological Association, and the American Association of University Women. She was the president from 1947 to 1948 of the American Society for Aesthetics. Duke University named one of their residence halls the Gilbert-Addoms Hall after her.

== Philosophy ==
Gilbert's main interests in philosophy were aesthetics, art, criticism, architecture, dance, and literature. She was primarily interested in what beauty meant to the observer making it the artist's obligation to communicate their experience to the onlooker. In Philosophy of Feeling in Current Poetics Gilbert argues that the purpose of poetry should be to leave the reader with a satisfied sense where the world of immediate experience appears more "real". Contemporary poetry, on the other hand, makes the world more foreign, distant, and confusing.

== History of Aesthetics ==
Published in 1939 with Helmut Kuhn, History of Aesthetics was made to be a textbook for University students as well as others curious to know more about what aesthetics mean. She acknowledges in the preface that her book necessarily limits the diverse range of opinions held at any given point in history to a few very notable thinkers but such an oversimplification is useful for the reader to extract personal meaning.

The book is written as a dialogue being had across history on the basic questions like, "what is beauty?" and "how does one make things beautiful?" It begins with Plato, Aristotle, and the renaissance, quickly goes through the 17th and 18th centuries, highlights thinkers in the middle including Kant, Goethe, Humboldt, Schniller, Fichte, Schnelling, Hegel, and Schopenhauer, and ends with metaphysics in crisis, aesthetics in the age of science, and art in our times.

Gilbert articulates why it's important for art to be coherent with emphasis on human relatedness which can be achieved if art manages to produce an experience of heightened spirit. However she believes these values are in peril in the modern day since Nietzsche announced the Death of God. She hopes this can be overcome by not identifying with the end of truth but rather the process of getting to truth. She summarizes her position concisely at the end of her preface:

"What then do art and beauty mean? After submitting to the discipline of history the authors must say: Their meaning is not within the four corners of any one or two propositions, but is the fullness of significance which distills form the long-sustained process of all the definings. Who today would say where beauty lies? It is neither in Athens nor Strasbourg, but in all the places where there has been an objective counterpart of an authentic aesthetic feeling. The meaning of art and the meaning of beauty are similarly within the dialectic of the whole manifold of philosophical systems and styles."

== Publications ==
- Maurice Blondel's Philosophy of Action (1924)
- Studies in Recent Aesthetics (1927)
- A History of Aesthetics (1939), with Helmut Kuhn
- Aesthetic Studies: Architecture and Poetry (1952)

== Personal life ==
Gilbert was married to the Duke English professor Allan H. Gilbert. They had two sons: Everett, a chemist who earned 180 patents during his career, and Creighton, an art historian.
