= Faultless disagreement =

Concept in logic

A faultless disagreement is a disagreement when Party A states that P is true, while Party B states that non-P is true, and neither party is at fault. Disagreements of this kind may arise in areas of evaluative discourse, such as aesthetics, justification of beliefs or moral values, etc. A representative example is that John says Paris is more interesting than Rome, while Bob claims Rome is more interesting than Paris. In the case of a faultless disagreement, it is possible that if any party gives up their claim, there will be no improvement in the position of any of them.

Within the framework of formal logic it is impossible that both P and not-P are true, and it was attempted to justify faultless disagreements within the framework of relativism of the Truth (propositional truth being relative to perspectives), Max Kölbel and Sven Rosenkranz argued that genuine faultless disagreements are impossible. However, defenses of faultless disagreement, and of alethic relativism more generally, continue to be made by critics of formal logic as it is currently constructed.
