= Paradox (literature) =

Figure of speech in literature

In literature, the paradox is an anomalous juxtaposition of incongruous ideas for the sake of striking exposition or unexpected insight. It functions as a method of literary composition and analysis that involves examining apparently contradictory statements and drawing conclusions either to reconcile them or to explain their presence.

Literary or rhetorical paradoxes abound in the works of Oscar Wilde and G. K. Chesterton. Most literature deals with paradox of situation; Rabelais, Cervantes, Sterne, Borges, and Chesterton are recognized as masters of the situation as well as a verbal paradox. Statements such as Wilde's "I can resist anything except temptation" and Chesterton's "spies do not look like spies" are examples of rhetorical paradox. Further back, Polonius' observation that "though this be madness, yet there is a method in't" is a memorable third. Also, statements that are illogical and metaphoric may be called paradoxes, for example: "The pike flew to the tree to sing." The literal meaning is illogical, but there are many interpretations of this metaphor.

== Cleanth Brooks' "Language of Paradox" ==
Cleanth Brooks, an active member of the New Criticism movement, outlines the use of reading poems through paradox as a method of critical interpretation. A paradox in poetry means that tension at the surface of a verse can lead to apparent contradictions and hypocrisies. Brooks' seminal essay, The Language of Paradox, lays out his argument for the centrality of paradox by demonstrating that paradox is "the language appropriate and inevitable to poetry." The argument is based on the contention that referential language is too vague for the specific message a poet expresses; he must "make up his language as he goes." This, Brooks argues, is because words are mutable and meaning shifts when words are placed in relation to one another.

In the writing of poems, paradox is used as a method by which unlikely comparisons can be drawn and meaning can be extracted from poems both straightforward and enigmatic.

Brooks points to William Wordsworth's poem It is a beauteous evening, calm and free. He begins by outlining the initial and surface conflict, which is that the speaker is filled with worship, while his female companion does not seem to be. The paradox, discovered by the poem's end, is that the girl is more full of worship than the speaker precisely because she is always consumed with sympathy for nature and not – as is the speaker – in tune with nature while immersed in it.

In his reading of Wordsworth's poem, "Composed upon Westminster Bridge", Brooks as contends that the poem offers paradox not in its details, but in the situation the speaker creates. Though London is a man-made marvel, and in many respects in opposition to nature, the speaker does not view London as a mechanical and artificial landscape but as a landscape composed entirely of nature. Since London was created by man, and man is a part of nature, London is thus too a part of nature. It is this reason that gives the speaker the opportunity to remark upon the beauty of London as he would a natural phenomenon, and, as Brooks points out, can call the houses "sleeping" rather than "dead" because they too are vivified with the natural spark of life, granted to them by the men that built them.

Brooks ends his essay with a reading of John Donne's poem The Canonization, which uses a paradox as its underlying metaphor. Using a charged religious term to describe the speaker's physical love as saintly, Donne effectively argues that in rejecting the material world and withdrawing to a world of each other, the two lovers are appropriate candidates for canonization. This seems to parody both love and religion, but in fact it combines them, pairing unlikely circumstances and demonstrating their resulting complex meaning. Brooks points also to secondary paradoxes in the poem: the simultaneous duality and singleness of love, and the double and contradictory meanings of "die" in Metaphysical poetry (used here as both sexual union and literal death). He contends that these several meanings are impossible to convey at the right depth and emotion in any language but that of paradox. A similar paradox is used in Shakespeare's Romeo and Juliet, when Juliet says, "For saints have hands that pilgrims' hands do touch and palm to palm is holy palmer's kiss."

Brooks' contemporaries in the sciences were, in the 1940s and 50's, reorganizing university science curricula into codified disciplines. The study of English, however, remained less defined and it became a goal of the New Critical movement to justify literature in an age of science by separating the work from its author and critic (see Wimsatt and Beardsley's Intentional fallacy and Affective fallacy) and by examining it as a self-sufficient artifact. In Brooks's use of the paradox as a tool for analysis, however, he develops a logical case as a literary technique with strong emotional effect. His reading of "The Canonization" in The Language of Paradox, where paradox becomes central to expressing complicated ideas of sacred and secular love, provides an example of this development.

== Paradox and irony ==
Although paradox and irony as New Critical tools for reading poetry are often conflated, they are independent poetical devices. Irony for Brooks is "the obvious warping of a statement by the context" whereas paradox is later glossed as a special kind of qualification that "involves the resolution of opposites."

Irony functions as a presence in the text – the overriding context of the surrounding words that make up the poem. Only sentences such as 2 + 2 = 4 are free from irony; most other statements are prey to their immediate context and are altered by it (take, as an example, the following joke. "A woman walks into a bar and asks for a double entendre. The bartender gives it to her." This last statement, perfectly acceptable elsewhere, is transformed by its context in the joke to an innuendo). Irony is the key to validating the poem because a test of any statement grows from the context – validating a statement demands examining the statement in the context of the poem and determining whether it is appropriate to that context.

Paradox, however, is essential to the structure and being of the poem. In The Well Wrought Urn Brooks shows that paradox was so essential to poetic meaning that paradox was almost identical to poetry. According to literary theorist Leroy Searle, Brooks' use of paradox emphasized the indeterminate lines between form and content. "The form of the poem uniquely embodies its meaning," and the language of the poem "affects the reconciliation of opposites or contraries." While irony functions within the poem, paradox often refers to the meaning and structure of the poem and is thus inclusive of irony. This existence of opposites or contraries and the reconciliation thereof is poetry and the meaning of the poem.

== Criticism ==
R.S. Crane, in his essay The Critical Monism of Cleanth Brooks, argues strongly against Brooks' centrality of paradox. For one, Brooks believes that the very structure of poetry is paradox, and ignores the other subtleties of imagination and power that poets bring to their poems. Brooks simply believed that, "'Imagination' reveals itself in the balance or reconciliation of opposite or discordant qualities." Brooks, in leaning on the crutch of paradox, only discusses the truth poetry can reveal, and speaks nothing about the pleasure it can give. (231) Also, by defining poetry as uniquely having a structure of paradox, Brooks ignores the power of paradox in everyday conversation and discourse, including scientific discourse, which Brooks claimed was opposed to poetry. Crane claims that, using Brooks' definition of poetry, the most powerful paradoxical poem in modern history is Einstein's formula E = mc^{2}, which is a profound paradox in that matter and energy are the same thing. The argument for the centrality of paradox (and irony) becomes a reductio ad absurdum and is therefore void (or at least ineffective) for literary analysis.
