= Literary work =

Written work read for enjoyment or edification

Literary work is a generic term for works of literature, i.e. texts such as fiction and non-fiction books, essays, screenplays.

In the philosophy of art and the field of aesthetics there is some debate about what that means, precisely.

What a literary work is can encompass poems, novels, dramas, short stories, sagas, legends, and satires, but in one definition is taken to exclude fact-oriented writing. In length a literary work can range from short poems to trilogy novels, and in tone from comic verse to tragedy.

== What "literary" means ==
The first question is narrowing down "literature". Many, from Jean Paul Sartre through Hazard Adams to Laurence Lerner, have written extensively on the subject, it being the focus of entire essays and chapters.

In simple terms, a literary work stands differentiated from, for example, a philosophical work or a scientific work, albeit that there is a lot of overlap between the philosophical and the literary. And there is broad basic agreement amongst modern art philosophers and critics that "literature" does not encompass older meanings of the word, that are considered obsolete. The plain word has had several meanings over the centuries, having meant both literacy and literary erudition, such as "a man of much literature" meaning someone who is well read or who has a lot of book-learning.

Its more recent meaning of any written work whatsoever is also not how it is popularly understood, as literary works have some quality that distinguishes them from mere written works. Neil and Sarah King leave it at that, an "undefined quality".

But Peter Lamarque observes that there is more definition than that, with the general popular understanding being that there is a contrast between the literary and the everyday that makes certain works "literary works" and others not, inasmuch as the literary is "more ornate, structured, or self-conscious". However, Lamarque notes a problem with this populist definition in that it excludes much modern literature that is wholly devoid of ornateness and yet includes works that simply include rhetorical forms somewhere. Ornate language is not by itself alone a sufficient condition for something qualifying as a literary work.

Lamarque observes that the idea from the 19th century onwards has been that the literature of literary works covers "works of the imagination", albeit a subset of those and not all. Publishers do not extend the mantle of literature to popular fiction, drama, or light verse; and they distinguish fiction literary works, as a genre, from science fiction, crime fiction, horror fiction, fantasy fiction, war fiction, and horror fiction.

Truly problematic cases are exemplified by Peter Handke's poem FC Nürnberg, which comprises a list of names of soccer players, without any rhetoric, ornateness, or even narrative; which makes it difficult to categorize as a literary work at all; and conversely the Bible which contains many literary factors but which is not conventionally considered to be a literary work.

Terry Eagleton argues that the category is largely circular: a work is literary because it is subject to literary criticism, and literary criticism only covers literary works. This roughly coincides with the stance of Lamarque and Stein Haugon Olsen, which is that a literary work becomes a literary work when a literary institution takes a literary stance towards it, and a literary institution, in its turn is a "rule-governed practice" whose rules determine what a literary stance is and how literary works are treated aesthetically. Lamarque states that literary works "are not 'natural kinds' but instutitional entities determined by social norms."

John Martin Ellis observed in the 1970s that it had "become quite common for critics and theorists alike to raise the question, only to go on and assert that we all know what we mean by literature even if we cannot define it". John Searle also concluded in the 1970s that "there is no trait or set of traits which all works of literature have in common and which could constitute the necessary and sufficient conditions for being a work of literature".

== What constitutes a "work" ==
Usually a literary work involves a text, although views vary on exactly how; and some argue that literary works are not necessarily even textual at all, as they can also encompass oral literature.

One postmodern view is that a literary work is reductibly a text; a "mere string of sentences". Lamarque's formalism of this view is that a text is "an ordered set of sentence-types individuated at least partly by semantic and syntactic properties". Stefán Snævarr explains that this view is, in its most reductionist form, irrespective of whether the text is fiction or factual: the semantics of the sentences are irrelevant. "Anna Karenina" he says, "would not cease to be a literary fictional narrative even though by chance every single sentence in the novel happened to be true".

However, Lamarque and others argue that that is insufficient, as this removes the author from the picture, and the author, in particular the intent of the author, matters in order to comprehend the work. Context matters, in other words. A literary work is not just some abstraction, a sequence of words, but an utterance made by an author whose historical and other circumstances are vital to its understanding. The full Lamarquian view makes a distinctiction between the physical embodiment of a work (e.g. an actual physical book copy), the text, the work, and its interpretation.

Thomas Leddy disagrees with the text-work dualism, calling it the myth of the text. In Leddy's view, there is a class of physical objects that are copies of the work, not necessarily exact copies but fair copies of the primary one, usually the author's original manuscript; with translations, abridgements, collections of fragments of lost original manuscripts, and collections of closely related manuscripts derived from a lost original, all being variations of this class. Leddy by 2016 had developed his stance to argue that "I now think that texts are ontologically mythical. I have never seen such things and I am not even sure what they would look like.".

Leddy categorizes this disagreement with Lamarque as one of how one defines the equivalence relation for two things being the same literary work. The Lamarquian view hinges on two texts being identical "if they have the same semantic and syntactic properties, are in the same language, and consist of the same word-types and sentence-types ordered in the same way". Peter Swirski calls this simple structural equivalence localism, in artistic criticism in general, and textualism specifically for literary criticism, and points to Monroe C. Beardsley's 1946 "The Intentional Fallacy" as amongst one of its greatest influences (as well as a foundation for New Criticism).

The Leddy view is that two literary works can be textually identical, word for word, and yet be different literary works if they were "written by different persons at two different times without one having knowledge of the other"; the textual identity being a simple happenstance. This is a point that Lamarque also supports, but argues that the differentiation comes from appreciation of authorial and historical context, which is external to the notion of a text. From this Leddy argues that the entire notion of a text is superfluous, as everything that can be said about texts can also be said about works. Swirski observes that deconstruction has not done away with textualism, with later textualist critics making self-contradictory statements about appreciating "literary texts", when the whole reductionist idea of a text is that it has no attributes of influence, genre, or originality, which textualists hold apply to the work rather than to the text.

The Pleasures of Imagination

Yet, by immense benignity inclin'd
To spread about him that primeval joy
Which fill'd himself, he rais'd his plastic arm

— Mark Akenside, lines 311–313, Book 2, London, 1744

One of Leddy's problems with the Lamarquian view is Lamarque's own recognition of a problem identified by Beardsley: a 1744 poem (quoted at right) where the words of the poem alone allow, when it is reduced to a text, for the word "plastic" to be read, anachronistically, as referencing modern plastic, even though that is a nonsense that cannot match any possible 18th century authorial intent. Leddy argues that dispensing with the idea of a dualism between work and text removes this problem entirely. "In fact, there is no text at all." he states. Literary works (and indeed other works of art) are, in his view, the physical objects, not derived from abstractions like texts. A book, its text, and the literary work are all just three ways of referencing one thing, according to need.

== See also ==
- Lost literary work
