= Daniel O. Nathan =

American philosopher

Education
- Education: University of Illinois at Chicago (PhD), University of Michigan (AB)
- Thesis: Reason and Content in Morality (1977)
- Doctoral advisor: Richard Kraut

Philosophical work
- Era: 21st century Philosophy
- Region: Western philosophy
- Institutions: Texas Tech University
- Main interests: Aesthetics, ethical theory, philosophy of law
- Notable ideas: Paradox of Intentionalism
- Website: https://sites.google.com/site/danielonathan/home

Daniel Osher Nathan is an American philosopher and Professor of Philosophy at Texas Tech University. He is known for his expertise on aesthetics, ethical theory, and philosophy of law.

== Views ==
Nathan defends an anti-intentionalist position in aesthetic interpretation and believes that intentionalism stems from a faulty analogy between an artwork and an utterance for communication.

== See also ==
- William K. Wimsatt
- Monroe Beardsley
- Judicial interpretation
- Legal interpretation
