= Organic unity =

Concept in philosophy

Organic unity is the idea that a thing is made up of interdependent parts. For example, a body is made up of its constituent organs, and a society is made up of its constituent social roles. In Aristotle's Poetics he likened drama narrative's and action to organic form, presenting it as "a complete whole, with its several incidents so closely connected that the transposal or withdrawal of any one of them will disjoin and dislocate the whole".

== Literature ==
The main theme of organic unity relies on a free-spirited style of writing and by following any guidelines or genre-based habits, the true nature of a work becomes stifled and unreliable on an artistic plane. The concept of organic unity gained popularity through the New Critics movement. Cleanth Brooks played an integral role in modernizing the organic unity principle. In The Well Wrought Urn, Brooks used the poem "The Canonization" by John Donne as an example to relate the importance of a work's ability to flow and maintain a theme, so that the work gains momentum from beginning to end. Organic unity is the common thread that keeps a theme from becoming broken and disjointed as a work moves forward.

== Music ==
Modernist composer Arnold Schoenberg's understanding of musical form (Formenlehre) was grounded in his intensive study of the German classical music tradition, from Johann Sebastian Bach through Gustav Mahler. From this repertoire, he identified recurring formal principles and an underlying concept of organic unity, in which a musical composition's coherence emerges through the development and variation of musical ideas. Sometimes the sense of form is liquidated into, or subsumed by, an overarching process of developing variation, where all themes or motives steadily grow out of germinal content, including contours and rhythms. He regarded these principles as fundamentals of composition that would endure amid the emancipation of the dissonance, but his views did not always leave room for other approaches.

== See also ==
- Arch form
- Chiastic structure
- Form and content
- Gesamtkunstwerk
- Organic form
- Organicism
- Schenkerian analysis
- Unity in diversity
- Unity of opposites
