= The Heresy of Paraphrase =

"The Heresy of Paraphrase" is the name of the paradox where it is impossible to paraphrase a poem because paraphrasing a poem removes its form, which is an integral part of its meaning. Its name comes from a chapter by the same name in Cleanth Brooks's book The Well-Wrought Urn. Critics disagree about if aspects of sound and form can be paraphrased, and agree that the exact aesthetic beauty of a poem cannot be replicated in paraphrase or translation.

== Origin ==
Cleanth Brooks identifies the heresy of paraphrase in the eponymous chapter from The Well Wrought Urn, a work of the New Criticism. Brooks argues that meaning in poetry is irreducible, because "a true poem is...an experience rather than any mere statement about experience or any mere abstraction from experience." Since the form of a poem is an important part of its meaning, that the process of paraphrasing it affects its meaning too much for the paraphrase to be an accurate summary of its meaning. The meaning of the poem is embodied in its sensual aspects of the arrangement, sound, and rhythm of the words, which are not translateable (an argument also made by Benedetto Croce). He compared a poem to a drama, which draws meaning from how it enacts ambiguity, irony, and paradox.

== Folklore ==
An oft-repeated story illustrating the heresy of paraphrase is that T.S. Eliot was once asked the meaning of a line from his poem Ash Wednesday. Instead of paraphrasing his own poetry, he repeated the line.

== Reception ==
Multiple proponents of New Criticism supported the idea that poetry cannot be paraphrased or translated without losing essential meaning. Among the critics who agreed with the heresy of paraphrase were Cleanth Brooks, Robert Penn Warren, William Wimsatt, Monroe Beardsley, Murrey Krieger, and I.A. Richards. Yvor Winters and Stanley Cavell participated in this debate during the 20th century.

In his analysis of the heresy of paraphrase, Ernie Lepore concluded that some aspects of poetry, like its form and sound, are not possible to paraphrase. He noted that there is some consensus that translations of poems must sacrifice literal meaning or sensual effect, or some combination of both, when translated. He put forth the idea of a simple refutation to the heresy of paraphrase: that it is possible to introduce a new expression that means exactly the same thing as the expression being paraphrased. The reason the simple refutation does not work is because there is a distinction between expressions and "their vehicles of articulation."

Writing in The Oxford Handbook of Aesthetics, Alex Neill argues that poems can be paraphrased. The meaning of a poem is often at least partially contained in the "thoughts it articulates," which can be paraphrased. Metaphors can be paraphrased, and implicit meaning in a poem can be made explicit. Even if there are aspects of a poem that are not paraphrasable, such as sound and form, no one expects a paraphrase to contain a poem's exact meaning. However, a paraphrase cannot replicate the same beauty as the poem it is based on.

== Works cited ==
- Lepore, Ernie (2009). "The Heresy of Paraphrase: When the Medium Really Is the Message" (PDF). Midwest Studies in Philosophy. 33.
