= It is a beauteous evening, calm and free =

Sonnet by William Wordsworth

It is a beauteous evening, calm and free

It is a beauteous evening, calm and free,
The holy time is quiet as a Nun
Breathless with adoration; the broad sun
Is sinking down in its tranquillity;
The gentleness of heaven broods o'er the Sea:
Listen! the mighty Being is awake,
And doth with his eternal motion make
A sound like thunder—everlastingly.
Dear Child! dear Girl! that walkest with me here,
If thou appear untouched by solemn thought,
Thy nature is not therefore less divine:
Thou liest in Abraham's bosom all the year;
And worship'st at the Temple's inner shrine,
God being with thee when we know it not.

"It is a beauteous evening, calm and free" is a sonnet by William Wordsworth written at Calais in August 1802. It was first published in the collection Poems, in Two Volumes in 1807, appearing as the nineteenth poem in a section entitled 'Miscellaneous sonnets'.

The sonnet describes an evening walk on the beach with his nine-year-old daughter Caroline Vallon. Wordsworth reflects that if his young daughter is seemingly unaffected by the majesty of the scene it is because, being young, she is naturally at one with nature.

== History ==
A very warm gentle morning—a little rain. Wm wrote two sonnets on Buonaparte after I had read Milton's sonnets to him ...

— Dorothy Wordsworth, Grasmere Journal, Friday 21 May 1802

Until that Friday 21 May 1802, Wordsworth had shunned the sonnet form, but his sister Dorothy's recital of Milton's sonnets had "fired him" and he went on to write some 415 in all.

"It is a beauteous evening" is the only "personal" sonnet he wrote at this time; others written in 1802 were political in nature and "Dedicated to Liberty" in the 1807 collection.

The simile "quiet as a nun / Breathless with adoration" is often cited as an example of how a poet achieves effects. On the one hand "breathless" reinforces the placid evening scene Wordsworth is describing; on the other hand it suggests tremulous excitement, preparing the reader for the ensuing image of the eternal motion of the sea. Cleanth Brooks provided an influential analysis of the sonnet in terms of these tensions in The Well Wrought Urn: Studies in the Structure of Poetry (see also Paradox (literature)).

The reference to Abraham's bosom (cf. Luke 16:22) has also attracted critical attention as that is normally associated with Heaven (or at least Purgatory) in the Christian tradition, inviting comparison with the Lucy poems. However, a natural reading is that Wordsworth was simply stressing the closeness of the Child to the divine: Stephen Gill references Wordsworth's ode: "Intimations of Immortality".

The 'natural piety' of children was a subject that preoccupied Wordsworth at the time and was developed by him in "Intimations", the first four stanzas of which he had completed earlier in the year but had put aside because he could not decide the origin of the presumed natural affinity with the divine in children, nor why we lose it when we emerge from childhood. (Note: Dorothy's Grasmere Journal records that Wordsworth wrote the first part of "Intimations" on the morning of 27 March 1802, a day after writing Caroline's mother, Annette Vallon, the previous morning.) By 1804 he believed he had found the answer in the Platonic doctrine of the pre-existence of souls and was able to complete his ode. The fifth line in the sonnet, "The gentleness of heaven broods o'er the Sea", references the creation story of Genesis 1:2 (compare Milton's Paradise Lost 7:235, a poem Wordsworth knew virtually by heart), and a similar use of "broods" eventually appeared in "Intimations" in stanza VIII

Thou, over whom thy Immortality
Broods like the Day, a Master o'er a Slave,
A Presence which is not to be put by ...

The reference to the everlasting motion of the sea in the sonnet recalls the argument for immortality in Plato's dialogue Phaedrus (which also treats erotic love). Directly across the water, these images (and the direct imperative "Listen!") were to be later echoed by Matthew Arnold, an early admirer (with reservations) of "Intimations", in his poem "Dover Beach", but in a more subdued and melancholy vein, lamenting the loss of faith, and in what amounts to free verse rather than the tightly disciplined sonnet form that so attracted Wordsworth.

=== Caroline Wordsworth ===
Caroline, born December 1792 (baptised 15 December), was Wordsworth's daughter by Annette Vallon (1766–1841), daughter of a surgeon at Blois, with whom Wordsworth had evidently entered into a relationship while visiting France during the Revolution in 1792. The subsequent war with England had put aside any hopes of marriage and it was only during the brief Peace of Amiens in 1802 that Wordsworth was able to visit and to see his daughter for the first time, though he and Annette had exchanged letters in the interim. By this time he was engaged to marry his childhood friend, Mary Hutchinson, a marriage made possible only by the settlement of a debt owed the Wordsworth family.

The affair was known to Dorothy and his immediate family and friends, including Coleridge and (eventually) Southey, but kept secret from the public and only published in 1916 as a result of George McLean Harper's researches. (Note: The relevant passage in Harper is as follows: The tie that bound Wordsworth to France at this time was an unfortunate attachment which was destined to cast a shadow over his life for many years. Where and in what circumstances it began I cannot say. The object of his rash affection bore the name of Annette, and was known in later life as Madame Vallon. There is every reason to believe that in its general features the poem entitled " Vaudracour and Julia " gives an account of the reasons for their separation. We must remember, in thinking of his original fault, that he had been an orphan since early boyhood, that his guardians and teachers had been indifferent to his fate, that society towards the end of the eighteenth century was lax in its views of sexual morality, and, furthermore, that France was in a state of unnatural excitement. Annette bore him a daughter, who received the name Caroline. After his return to England he kept in correspondence with the mother. Dorothy Wordsworth was cognizant of the facts. While the knowledge saddened and perturbed her, it never weakened her love for her brother; and this alone would be sufficient proof to me that he did what he could to make amends for his false step. — George McLean Harper, William Wordsworth and Annette Vallon pp. 141-2 but that is in substance all he has to say about the affair.) In the early 1920s, two early letters from Annette that had been impounded during the Napoleonic wars were discovered in the departmental archives of Loir-et-Cher. Other than a later 1834 letter, these are the only letters from Annette that survive (while letters from Wordsworth and Dorothy are lost). The earlier two letters reveal a spirited and charming young lady much in love with Wordsworth, well able to fend for herself. In hindsight it seems that the story of the doomed illicit love affair between Vaudracour and Julia that appears in The Prelude, also published as a separate longer poem in 1820, is an oblique autobiographical reference to Wordsworth's affair.

Neither is there any real record left to us of the Calais meeting. Dorothy provides an entry in her journals, but it was plainly entered later and there is no day by day account of the month-long visit, which must nevertheless have been a success given its length. Caroline herself is mentioned only fleetingly. (Note: In her journals, Dorothy generally only records letters between Wordsworth and Annette with no other details. Just once does she make a more intimate comment when she characterises a letter from Annette as being from 'poor Annette' (on 22 March 1802) and on that same day she and Wordsworth resolved to visit Annette.)

On the evidence of the sonnet, it is plain that Wordsworth felt genuine affection for his daughter, as indeed did Mary who was anxious that Wordsworth should do more for Caroline should their circumstances improve. Her wish was granted at Caroline's marriage in 1816, when Wordsworth settled £30 annually on Caroline, a generous allowance (£1,360 purchasing power in year 2000 pounds sterling) that continued until 1835, when it was replaced by a capital settlement of £400.

Wordsworth, together with Dorothy and Mary and their friend Crabb Robinson, saw Annette and Caroline just once more on a visit to Paris in 1820. By then Caroline had two young daughters. The younger of these left no children, but the elder, Louise Marie Dorothée Baudouin (third name after Dorothy), married the painter Théophile Vauchelet, bearing two daughters from whom the present day French descendants of Wordsworth stem. Caroline died in 1862. There is a portrait of Annette by Vauchelet in the museum at Versailles.

== "The Evening star & the glory of the sky" ==
Dorothy's journal entry gives scanty details of their Calais visit (though it does offer ample evidence of her remarkable descriptive power) and brings us back to abruptly to Dover following the second of just two references to Caroline:

We arrived at Calais at 4 o'clock on Sunday morning the 31st of July [1 Aug] ... We walked by the sea-shore almost every Evening with Annette & Caroline or Wm & I alone ... seeing far off in the west the Coast of England like a cloud crested with Dover Castle, which was but like the summit of the cloud—the Evening star & the glory of the sky ... Nothing in Romance was ever half so beautiful. Now came in view as the Evening star sank down & the colours of the west faded away the two lights of England, lighted up by Englishmen in our Country to warn vessels of rocks or sands. These we used to see from the Pier when we could see no other distant objects but the Clouds the Sky & the Sea itself. All was dark behind. The town of Calais seemed deserted of the light of heaven, but there was always light, & life, & joy upon the Sea itself. —One night, though, I shall never forget, the day had been very hot, & William & I walked alone together upon the pier—the sea was gloomy for there was a blackness over all the sky except when it was overspread with lightning which often revealed to us a distant vessel. Near us the waves roared & broke against the pier, & as they broke & as they travelled towards us, they were interfused with greenish fiery light. The more distant sea always black and gloomy. It was, also beautiful on the calm hot nights to see the little Boats row out of the harbour with wings of fire & the sail boats with the fiery track which they cut as they went along & which closed up after them with a hundred thousand sparkles balls shootings, & streams of glowworm night. Caroline was delighted.
On Sunday the 29th of August we left Calais at 12 o'clock in the morning and landed at Dover at 1 on Monday the 30th. I was sick all the way ...

— Dorothy Wordsworth, Grasmere Journal, Sunday, 1 August 1802

=== "The Crescent-moon, the Star of Love" ===
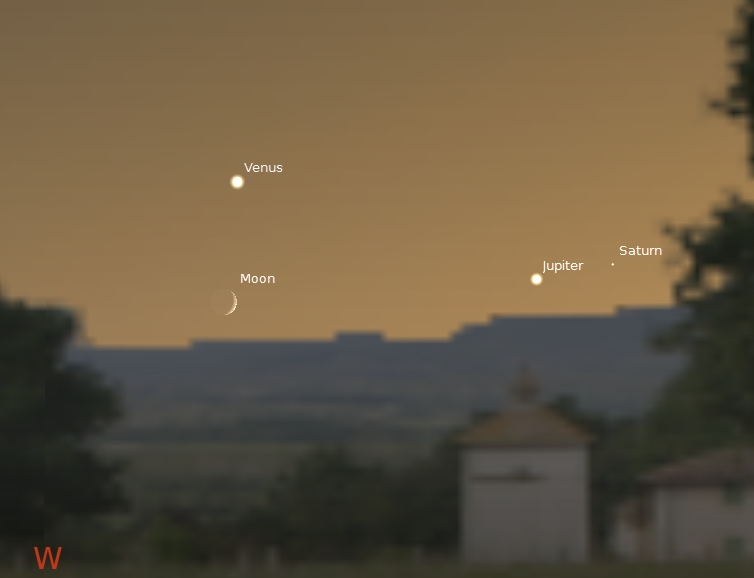
Calais sky to West at 9 pm 1 August 1802 using Stellarium

Dorothy's journal entry references the evening star sinking down in the west across the channel over Dover Castle, as does another of Wordsworth's Calais sonnets, "Fair Star of Evening, Splendour of the West". In fact on the day they arrived, Venus was in close conjunction with a three-day crescent moon, while Jupiter and Saturn, themselves in a relatively infrequent great conjunction (they occur roughly every 20 years) less than a fortnight before, were close by to the East. It must have been a beautiful sight and Dorothy, a knowledgeable observer of the night sky, must have been aware of it, possibly prevented from recording it earlier in her journal by the poor weather they had experienced journeying down from the North.

Some forty years later, six weeks as it happened after the death of Annette Vallon on 10 January the preceding month, Wordsworth composed these lines which were published in 1842:

The Crescent-moon, the Star of Love,
Glories of evening, as ye there are seen
With but a span of sky between
Speak one of you, my doubts remove,
Which is the attendant Page and which the Queen?

— William Wordsworth, Evening Voluntary XI, 25 February 1841

== Bibliography ==
- Brooks, Cleanth. The Well Wrought Urn: Studies in the Structure of Poetry, Mariner Books 1956
- Davies, Hunter. William Wordsworth, Weidenfeld and Nicolson 1980
- Gill, Stephen. "William Wordsworth: The Major Works including The Prelude", Oxford University Press 1984
- Gill, Stephen. William Wordsworth: A Life, Oxford University Press 1989
- Harper, George McLean. William Wordsworth : his life, works, and influence Scribner 1916
- Legouis, Emile. William Wordsworth and Annette Vallon J. M. Dent 1922
- Moorman, Mary. William Wordsworth, A Biography: The Early Years, 1770-1803 v. 1, Oxford University Press 1957
- Moorman, Mary. William Wordsworth: A Biography: The Later Years, 1803-50 v. 2, Oxford University Press 1965
- Page, Judith W. Wordsworth and the Cultivation of Women, University of California Press 1994
- E de Selincourt, Helen Darbishire. The Poetical Works of William Wordsworth, Oxford University Press 1947
- Wordsworth, Dorothy (ed. Pamela Woof). The Grasmere and Alfoxden Journals. Oxford University Press 2002
