= Composed upon Westminster Bridge, September 3, 1802 =

Petrarchan sonnet by William Wordsworth

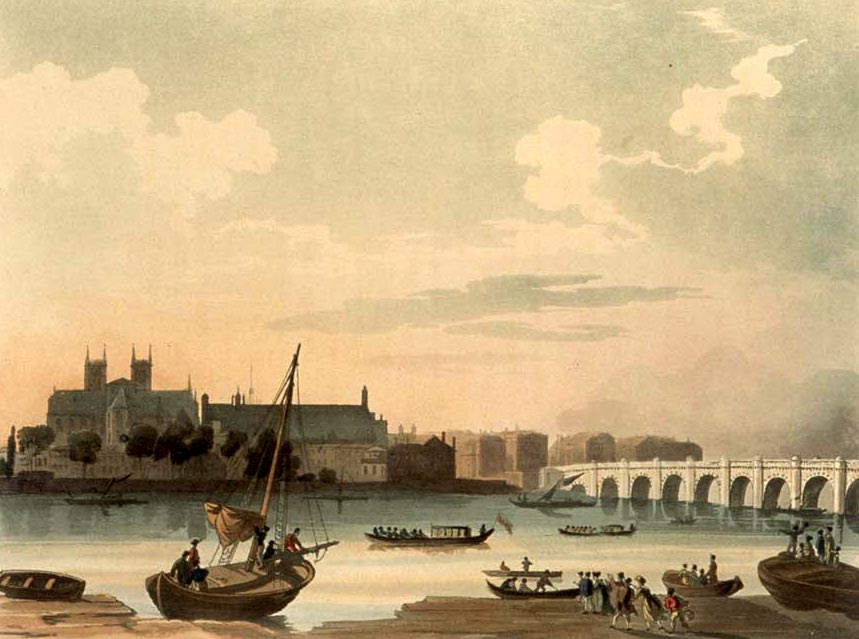
- Westminster Bridge as it appeared in 1808
- Earth has not anything to show more fair: Dull would he be of soul who could pass by A sight so touching in its majesty: This City now doth, like a garment, wear The beauty of the morning; silent, bare, Ships, towers, domes, theatres and temples lie Open unto the fields, and to the sky; All bright and glittering in the smokeless air. Never did sun more beautifully steep In his first splendor, valley, rock, or hill; Ne'er saw I, never felt, a calm so deep! The river glideth at his own sweet will: Dear God! The very houses seem asleep; And all that mighty heart is lying still! — William Wordsworth: Poems, in Two Volumes: Sonnet 14

"Composed upon Westminster Bridge, September 3, 1802" is a Petrarchan sonnet by William Wordsworth describing London and the River Thames, viewed from Westminster Bridge in the early morning. It was first published in the collection Poems, in Two Volumes in 1807.

== History ==
... we left London on Saturday morning at 1/2 past 5 or 6, the 31st July (I have forgot which) we mounted the Dover Coach at Charing Cross. It was a beautiful morning. The City, St pauls, with the River & a multitude of little Boats, made a most beautiful sight as we crossed Westminster Bridge. The houses were not overhung by their cloud of smoke & they were spread out endlessly, yet the sun shone so brightly with such a pure light that there was even something like the purity of one of nature's own grand Spectacles

— Dorothy Wordsworth, The Grasmere Journal, 31 July 1802

The sonnet was originally dated 1803, but this was corrected in later editions and the date of composition given precisely as 31 July 1802, when Wordsworth and his sister Dorothy were travelling to Calais to visit Annette Vallon and his daughter Caroline by Annette, prior to his forthcoming marriage to Mary Hutchinson.

The sonnet has always been popular, escaping the generally excoriating reviews from critics such as Francis Jeffrey in the Edinburgh Review when Poems in Two Volumes was first published. The reason undoubtedly lies in its great simplicity and beauty of language, turning on Dorothy's observation that this man-made spectacle is nevertheless one to be compared to nature's grandest natural spectacles. Cleanth Brooks analysed the sonnet in these terms in The Well Wrought Urn: Studies in the Structure of Poetry. In his essay, "The Language of Paradox", Brooks claims that the poem presents a paradox not in its specific use of images, but in the scenario that the narrator constructs. For instance, London is foregrounded as a natural landscape and as an artificial marvel (both these images running in parallel). This is exemplified in his usage of the epithet "asleep" instead of "dead" in the penultimate line for the houses.

Stephen Gill remarks that at the end of his life Wordsworth, engaged in editing his works, contemplated a revision even of "so perfect a poem" as this sonnet in response to an objection from a lady that London could not both be "bare" and "clothed" (an example of the use of paradox in literature).

That the sonnet so closely follows Dorothy's journal entry comes as no surprise because Dorothy wrote her Grasmere Journal to "give Wm pleasure by it" and it was freely available to Wordsworth, who said of Dorothy that "She gave me eyes, she gave me ears" in his poem "The Sparrow's Nest".
