= The Canonization =

Poem by John Donne

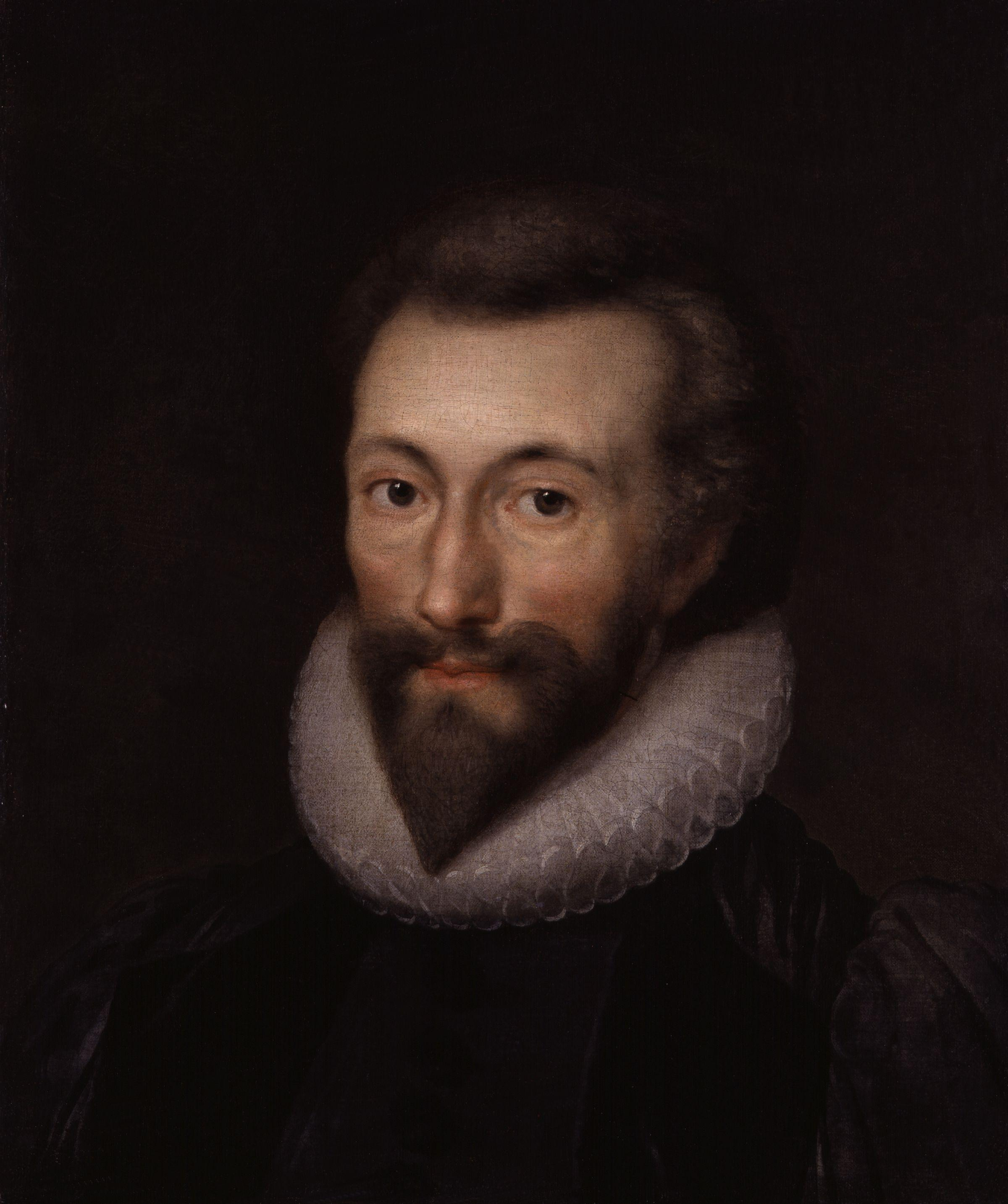
John Donne c. 1616

"The Canonization" is a poem by English metaphysical poet John Donne. First published in 1633, the poem is viewed as exemplifying Donne's wit and irony. It is addressed to one friend from another, but concerns itself with the complexities of romantic love: the speaker presents love as so all-consuming that lovers forgo other pursuits to spend time together. In this sense, love is asceticism, a major conceit in the poem. The poem's title serves a dual purpose: while the speaker argues that his love will canonise him into a kind of sainthood, the poem itself functions as a canonisation of the pair of lovers.

New Critic Cleanth Brooks used the poem, along with Alexander Pope's "An Essay on Man" and William Wordsworth's "Composed upon Westminster Bridge, September 3, 1802", to illustrate his argument for paradox as central to poetry.

== Imagery ==
The poem features images typical of the Petrarchan sonnet, yet they are more than the "threadbare Petrarchan conventionalities". In critic Clay Hunt's view, the entire poem gives "a new twist to one of the most worn conventions of Elizabethan love poetry" by expanding "the lover–saint conceit to full and precise definition", a comparison that is "seriously meant". In the third stanza, the speaker likens himself and his lover to candles, an eagle and dove, a phoenix, saints, and the dead. A reference to the Renaissance idea in which the eagle flies in the sky above the earth while the dove transcends the skies to reach heaven. Cleanth Brooks argues that the phoenix, which means rebirth, is a particularly apt analogy, since it combines the imagery of birds and of burning candles, and adequately expresses the power of love to preserve, though passion consumes.

All of the imagery employed strengthens the speaker's claim that love unites him and his lover, as well as giving the lovers a kind of immortality. The conceit involving saints and the pair of lovers serves to emphasise the spirituality of the lovers' relationship.

== Analyses and applications in criticism ==
In his analysis of "The Canonization", critic Leonard Unger focuses largely on the wit exemplified in the poem. In Unger's reading, the exaggerated metaphors employed by the speaker serve as "the absurdity which makes for wit". However, Unger points out that, during the course of the poem, its apparent wit points to the speaker's actual message: that the lover is disconnected from the world by virtue of his contrasting values, seen in his willingness to forgo worldly pursuits to be with his lover. Unger's analysis concludes by cataloguing the "devices of wit" found throughout the poem, as well as mentioning that a "complexity of attitudes," fostered largely through the use of the canonisation conceit, perpetuates wit within the poem.

"The Canonization" figures prominently in critic Cleanth Brooks's arguments for the paradox as integral to poetry, a central tenet of New Criticism. In his collection of critical essays, The Well Wrought Urn, Brooks writes that a poet "must work by contradiction and qualification," and that paradox "is an extension of the normal language of poetry, not a perversion of it". Brooks analyses several poems to illustrate his argument but cites "The Canonization" as his main evidence. According to Brooks, there are superficially many ways to read "The Canonization," but the most likely interpretation is that despite his witty tone and extravagant metaphors, Donne's speaker takes both love and religion seriously. He neither intends to mock religion by exalting love beside it nor aims to poke fun at love by comparing it to sainthood. Instead, Brooks argues, the apparent contradiction in taking both seriously translates into a truer account of both love and spirituality. The paradox is Donne's "inevitable instrument", allowing him with "dignity" and "precision" to express the idea that love may be all that is necessary for life. Without it, "the matter of Donne's poem unravels into 'facts'". Brooks looks at the paradox in a larger sense:

More direct methods may be tempting, but all of them enfeeble and distort what is to be said. ... Indeed, almost any insight important enough to warrant a great poem apparently has to be stated in such terms.

For Brooks, "The Canonization" illustrates that paradox is not limited to use in logic. Instead, paradox enables poetry to escape the confines of logical and scientific language.

However, Brooks's analysis is not the definitive reading of "The Canonization". A critique by John Guillory points out the superficiality of his logic. On whether to regard the equation of profane love with the divine as parody or paradox, Guillory writes that "the easy translation of parody into paradox is occasioned by Brooks's interest". Guillory also questions Brooks's decision to concentrate on the conflict between sacred and secular, rather than sacred and profane, as the central paradox: "the paradox overshoots its target". Guillory also writes that "the truth of the paradoxes in question", here the biblical quotations Brooks uses to support his claim that the language of religion is full of paradox, "beg[s] to be read otherwise", with literary implications in keeping with Brooks's agenda for a "resurgent literary culture".

Likewise, critic Jonathan Culler questions the New Critical emphasis on self-reference, the idea that by "enacting or performing what it asserts or describes, the poem becomes complete in itself, accounts for itself, and stands free as a self-contained fusion of being and doing". For Brooks, "The Canonization" serves as a monument, a "well-wrought urn" to the lovers, just as the speaker describes his canonisation through love: the lovers' "legend, their story, will gain them canonization". To Culler, however, this self-referentiality reveals "an uncanny neatness that generates paradox, a self-reference that ultimately brings out the inability of any discourse to account for itself", as well as the "failure" of being and doing to "coincide". Instead of a tidy, "self-contained urn", the poem depicts a "chain of discourses and representations", such as the legend about the lovers, poems about their love, praise from those who read these poems, the saintly invocations of the lovers, and their responses to these requests. In a larger sense, self-referentiality affords not closure but a long chain of references, such as Brooks's naming his New Critical treatise The Well-Wrought Urn to parallel the urn in the poem.
