= Developing variation =

Music composition technique

In musical composition, developing variation is a formal technique in which the variations are produced through the development of existing material. The term was coined by Arnold Schoenberg, twentieth-century composer and inventor of the twelve-tone technique, who believed it was one of the most important compositional principles since around 1750:

Music of the homophonic-melodic style of composition, that is, music with a main theme, accompanied by and based on harmony, produces its material by, as I call it, developing variation. This means that variation of the features of a basic unit produces all the thematic formulations which provide for fluency, contrasts, variety, logic and unity, on the one hand, and character, mood, expression, and every needed differentiation, on the other hand—thus elaborating the idea of the piece.

The technique has also become associated with Johannes Brahms, whom Schoenberg believed to have used it in its "most advanced state".

Schoenberg distinguished this from the "unravelling" procedures of contrapuntal tonal music, but developing variation may be related to other textures and to Schoenberg's own freely atonal pieces which employ a "method of atonal developing variation each chord, line, and harmony results from the subtle alteration and recombination of musical ideas from earlier in the piece". Schoenberg also described its importance to his development of serialism.

Similarly, as in the case of Die Jakobsleiter, here also all main themes had to be transformations of the first phrase. Already here the basic motif was not only productive in furnishing new motif-forms through developing variations, but also in producing more remote formulations based on the unifying effect of one common factor: the repetition of tonal and intervallic relationship.

Haimo applies the concept to vertical (pitch) as well as horizontal (rhythm and permutation) transformations in twelve-tone music on the premise of "the 'unity of musical space'" after suggesting that Schoenberg reconciled serial organization and developing variation in the twelve-tone technique.

== See also ==
- Carl Dahlhaus
- Christian Martin Schmidt
- Organic unity
- Rudolph Reti
