= Affective fallacy =

Concept in literary criticism

Affective fallacy is a term from literary criticism used to refer to the supposed error of judging or evaluating a text on the basis of its emotional effects on a reader. The term was coined by W.K. Wimsatt and Monroe Beardsley in 1949 as a principle of New Criticism which is often paired with their study of The Intentional Fallacy.

== Concept ==
The concept of affective fallacy is an answer to the idea of impressionistic criticism, which argues that the reader's response to a poem is the ultimate indication of its value. It is the antithesis of affective criticism, which is the practice of evaluating the effect that a literary work has on its reader or audience. The concept was presented after the authors had presented their paper on The Intentional Fallacy.

First defined in an article published in The Sewanee Review in 1946, the concept of affective fallacy was most clearly articulated in The Verbal Icon, Wimsatt's collection of essays published in 1954. Wimsatt used the term to refer to all forms of criticism that understood a text's effect upon the reader to be the primary route to analyzing the importance and success of that text. This definition of the fallacy, if strictly followed, touches on or wholly includes nearly all of the major modes of literary criticism, from Ovid's docere delictendo (to teach by delighting), Aristotle's catharsis, and Longinus's concept of "transport" to late-nineteenth century belles-lettres and the contemporary Chicago Critics. For Wimsatt, the fallacy led to a number of potential errors, most of them related to emotional relativism. A view of literature based on its putative emotional effects will always be vulnerable to mystification and subjectivity; Wimsatt singles out the belletristic tradition exemplified by critics such as Arthur Quiller-Couch and George Saintsbury as an instance of a type of criticism that relies on subjective impressions and is thus unrepeatable and unreliable.

For Wimsatt, as for all the New Critics, such impressionistic approaches pose both practical and theoretical problems. In practical terms, it makes reliable comparisons of different critics difficult, if not irrelevant. In this light, the affective fallacy ran afoul of the New Critics' desire to place literary criticism on a more objective and principled basis. On the theoretical plane, the critical approach denoted as affective fallacy was fundamentally unsound because it denied the iconicity of the literary text. New Critical theorists stressed the unique nature of poetic language, and they asserted that—in view of this uniqueness—the role of the critic is to study and elucidate the thematic and stylistic "language" of each text on its own terms, without primary reference to an outside context, whether of history, biography, or reader-response.

In practice, Wimsatt and the other New Critics were less stringent in their application of the theory than in their theoretical pronouncements. Wimsatt admitted the appropriateness of commenting on emotional effects as an entry into a text, as long as those effects were not made the focus of analysis.

The affective fallacy and the intentional fallacy were both important to the development of New Criticism, a literary movement that emphasized close reading and formal analysis of texts during the 1940s and 1950s.

== Reception ==
As with many concepts of New Criticism, the concept of the affective fallacy was both controversial and, though widely influential, never accepted wholly by any great number of critics.

The first critiques of the concept came, naturally enough, from those academic schools against whom the New Critics were ranged in the 1940s and 1950s, principally the historical scholars and the remaining belletristic critics. Early commentary deplored the use of the word "fallacy" itself, which seemed to many critics unduly combative. More sympathetic critics, while still objecting to Wimsatt's tone, accepted as valuable and necessary his attempt to place criticism on a more objective basis.

However, the extremism of Wimsatt's approach was ultimately judged untenable by a number of critics. Just as New Historicism repudiated the New Critics' rejection of historical context, so reader-response criticism arose partly from dissatisfaction with the concept of the text as icon. Reader-response critics denied that a text could have a quantifiable significance outside its being read and experienced by particular readers at particular moments. These critics rejected the idea of text as icon, focusing instead on the ramifications of the interaction between text and reader.

While the term remains current as a warning against unsophisticated use of emotional response in analyzing texts, the theory underlying the term has been thoroughly eclipsed by more recent developments in criticism.

== Wimsatt and Beardsley ==
"The Affective Fallacy is a confusion between the poem and its results (what it is and what it does), a special case of epistemological skepticism [ ... which ...] begins by trying to derive the standard of criticism from the psychological effects of the poem and ends in impressionism and relativism [with the result that] the poem itself, as an object of specifically critical judgment, tends to disappear."

"The report of some readers ... that a poem or story induces in them vivid images, intense feelings, or heightened consciousness, is neither anything which can be refuted nor anything which it is possible for the objective critic to take into account."

Wimsatt and Beardsley on an ideal, objective criticism: "It will not talk of tears, prickles or other physiological symptoms, of feeling angry, joyful, hot, cold, or intense, or of vaguer states of emotional disturbance, but of shades of distinction and relation between objects of emotion."

"The critic is not a contributor to statistical countable reports about the poem, but a teacher or explicator of meanings. His readers, if they are alert, will not be content to take what he says as testimony, but will scrutinize it as teaching."

== Sources ==
- Barry, Peter (2009). Beginning theory; an introduction to literary and cultural theory, 3rd edn, Manchester: Manchester University Press.
- Keast, William (1954). "Review of The Verbal Icon." Modern Language Notes 8 (1956): 591–7.
- Mao, Douglas (1996). "The New Critics and the Text Object." ELH 63 (1996): 227–254.
- Wimsatt, W.K & Monroe Beardsley, "The affective fallacy", Sewanee Review, vol. 57, no. 1, (1949): 31–55.
- Wimsatt, W.K. with Monroe Beardsley (1954). The Verbal Icon: Studies in the Meaning of Poetry. Lexington: University of Kentucky Press.
