= Terry Barrett =

American art critic & academic (1945-)

Terry Michael Barrett (1945 - October 29, 2023) was an American art critic, and Professor Emeritus at Ohio State University. His many books, anthology chapters, and articles about contemporary art, art criticism, aesthetics, and the teaching of these, have had a significant impact on the field.

== Terry Barrett's Principles for Interpreting Art ==
“If I follow these principles, I will be able to be confident that my interpretive efforts are in a right direction and a right spirit”

=== Barrett's Approach to Interpretation ===
Barrett uses a think aloud process. He begins by discussing what he knows about the painting. His process is guided by a series of questions, beginning with what he calls a literal reading of the painting. Barrett draws on prior knowledge and observations of the artwork to construct his interpretation. He looks beyond the artwork to further his understanding of the painting, he asks whether there are similarities between an artist's other works and does not interpret the artwork in isolation. He considers this within the context of the artist's oeuvre. Barrett turns to scholarly interpretations of an artwork for further insight. Barrett's approach may be summed up by words that are central to the title of his book – reflecting, wondering and responding. He reflects on what he sees literally and metaphorically. Based on prior experiences and knowledge he constructs an interpretation and articulates it verbally – this is his response to the artwork.

“When writing or telling about what we see and what we experience in the presence of an artwork, we build meaning; we do not merely report it”

A good interpretation is personally meaningful while also corresponding to the works visual elements and socio-cultural milieu. The interpretation has communal relevance. A good interpretation is developed through openness to the act of interpretation, a sense of wonder, keen observation, and a construction of understanding that can be shared with others.

=== Barrett's principles ===
• Artworks are always about something
• Subject matter + Medium + Form + Context = Meaning
• To interpret a work of art is to understand it in language
• Feelings are guides to interpretation
• The critical activities of describing, analysing, interpreting, judging and theorising about works of art interrelated and interdependent
• Artworks attract multiple interpretations and it is not the goal of interpretation to arrive at a single, grand, unified, composite interpretation
• There is a range of interpretations that any artwork will allow
• Meanings of artworks are not limited to what the artist intended them to mean
• Interpretations are not so much right, but are more or less reasonable, convincing, informative, and enlightening
• Interpretations imply a worldview
• Good interpretations tell more about the artwork than they tell about the interpreter
• The objects of interpretation are artworks, not artists
• All art is in part about the world in which it emerged
• All art is in part about other art
• Good interpretations have coherence, correspondence, and inclusiveness
• Interpreting art is an endeavour that is both individual and communal
• Some interpretations are better than others
• The admissibility of an interpretation is ultimately determined by a community of interpreters and the community is self-correcting
• Good interpretations invite us to see for ourselves and continue on our own

According to Arthur Danto, a contemporary philosopher and art critic, names, as an essential characteristic of artworks, “aboutness”. That artworks are necessarily about something is the cornerstone of Danto's philosophy of art. Since they are about something they must be interpreted. Barrett's book, Reflecting, Wondering and Responding, summarises Danto's theory as containing five major propositions, namely, that a work of art is (1) about something, (2) projects a point of view, (3) projects this point of view by rhetorical means, and (4) requires interpretation and that (5) the work and interpretation require an art-historical context.

=== Feelings are guides to interpretation ===
Emotions play a central role in interpreting works of art and in understanding the world. About emotions in interpreting art Goodman states; “The work of art is apprehended through the feelings as well as through the senses. Emotional numbness disables here as definitely if not as completely as blindness and deafness… emotion in aesthetic experience is a means of discerning what properties a work has and experiences.” Israel Scheffler, a philosopher who writes about education and art is a proponent of Goodman's theory of art, offers elaboration on how the emotions are intimately tied to our perception of the world. Emotions help us to construct a vision of the world and to define the critical features of that world: Emotions help us to see the environment in a certain light. Emotions tell us whether it is “beneficial or harmful, promising or threatening, fulfilling or thwarting.” The role of the emotions in reading the world applies to interpreting works of art: “reading our feelings and reading the work are, in general, virtually inseparable processes.”

=== Meanings of artworks are not always what the artist intended them to mean ===
Knowing what an artist meant to mean when making a work of art can be a tremendous aid to understanding that work of art. Artists’ intents can play a significant role for interpreters who want to formulate meanings about artists’ works. It would be intellectually foolish to ignore artists’ words about their works when trying to interpret those works. Barrets book does not assert, however, that the work necessarily means what the artist wants it to mean. To believe that a work of art means what its maker meant it to mean is to adhere to what is known in criticism and aesthetics as an Intentionalist position of interpretation. There are many objections to intentionalism such as the “Intentionalist Fallacy” – it is very difficult, if not impossible to know what the artist's intentions were. One should remember that it is artworks we attempt to interpret, not artists. One should also remember that intention indicates ambition and not necessarily achievement.

There are two types of Intentionalism: Actual Intentionalism and Hypothetical Intentionalism. Actual Intentionalism is the view that the meaning of a work of art is what its maker meant it to actually mean. Hypothetical Intentionalism is the view that the meaning of a work of art is what an ideal viewer surmises the artist's intent to have been. In Actual Intentionalism, the artist must have successfully realised his or her intent in the work for it to be interpreted accurately. Conversely, in Hypothetical Intentionalism, the viewer is an ideal viewer and successfully interprets the work. Barret says: “the meaning of a work of art is not limited to the meaning the artist had in mind when making the work; it can mean more or less or something different than the artist intended the work to mean.” To rely on the artists’ intent for an interpretation of an artwork is to put oneself in a passive role as a viewer. Reliance on the artists’ intent unwisely removes the responsibility of interpretation from the viewer; it also robs the viewer of the joy of interpretive thinking and the rewards of the new insights it yields into the art and the world.

=== The objects of interpretation are artworks, not artists ===
In some conversations and writings about art, it is artists who are interpreted rather than the artworks that they have made. In critical discourse it should be the art objects that are interpreted, not the persons who made them. We want to be reading works of art and not be engaged in mind-reading. If we focus on the artist rather than the work or ourselves, we are missing opportunities to better understand the work of art and our reactions to it.

=== All art is in part about the world in which it emerged ===
Donald Kuspit, contemporary art critic and aesthetician, reinforces this principle when discussing his decision to include psychoanalysis in his interpretation of works of art: “I began to feel that the artist is not exempt from life. There is no way out from seeing art as a reflection or meditation or a comment on life. I became interested in the process, including the artists life. I became interested in how art reflected life issues, or existential issues with which we are all involved.” All art can be shown and seen to emerge from the context of the time and the space in which it was made. Conversely, we cannot understand a work of art without imaginatively repositioning it in the context from which it emerged. In the words of Michael Foucault, “a text is made up of multiple writings, drawn from many cultures and entering into mutual relations of dialogue, parody, contestation.”

== Selected publications ==
- Criticizing Art: Understanding the Contemporary (1999) McGraw-Hill
- Criticizing Photographs: An Introduction to Understanding Images (1999) McGraw-Hill
- Interpreting Art : Reflecting, Wondering, and Responding (2002) McGraw-Hill
- Why Is That Art?: Aesthetics and Criticism of Contemporary Art (2007) Oxford University Press
- Making Art: Form and Meaning (2011) McGraw-Hill
- Modernism and Postmodernism: An Overview with Art Examples (1997) in Hutchens and Sums, eds., Art Education: Content and Practice in a Postmodern Era
- Weight of Photography (2010)
