= Tendenz =

In higher criticism, the Tendenz of a literary work is its drift or bias, sometimes also the actual authorial intent. Tendenzkritik is the analysis of a work to determine its aim or purpose. The term comes from the German for "tendency" (itself derived from English or French) and was coined in the 19th century. It is especially associated with the biblical criticism of F. C. Baur.
