= Unified field =

In music, unified field is the 'unity of musical space' created by the free use of melodic material as harmonic material and vice versa.

The technique is most associated with the twelve-tone technique, created by its 'total thematicism' where a tone-row (melody) generates all (harmonic) material. It was also used by Alexander Scriabin, though from a diametrically opposed direction, created by his use of extremely slow harmonic rhythm which eventually led to his use of unordered pitch-class sets, usually hexachords (of six pitches) as harmony from which melody may also be created.

It may also be observed in Igor Stravinsky's Russian period, such as in Les Noces, derived from his use of folk melodies as generating material and influenced by shorter pieces by Claude Debussy, such as Voiles, and Modest Mussorgsky. In Béla Bartók's Bagatelles, and several of Alfredo Casella's Nine Piano Pieces such as No. 4 'In Modo Burlesco' the close intervallic relationship between motive and chord creates or justifies the great harmonic dissonance.

Webern was the only one...who was conscious of a new sound-dimension, of the abolition of horizontal-vertical opposition, so that he saw in the series only a way of giving structure to the sound-space....That functional redistribution of intervals toward which he tended marks an extremely important moment in the history of language.

— Pierre Boulez, Notes of an Apprenticeship, p.149,

== See also ==
- Counterpoint
- Organic unity
- Polyphony
- Pitch space
