= Form and content =

Distinct aspects of a work of art

In art and art criticism, form and content are considered distinct aspects of a work of art. The term form refers to the work's composition, techniques and media used, and how the elements of design are implemented. It mainly focuses on the physical aspects of the artwork, such as medium, color, value, space, etc., rather than on what it communicates. Content, on the other hand, refers to a work's subject matter, i.e., its meaning. But the terms form and content can be applied not only to art: every meaningful text has its inherent form, hence form and content appear in very diverse applications of human thought: from fine arts to even mathematics and natural sciences. Even more, the distinction between these terms' meanings in different domains of application seems rather unnatural, since the idea behind "form and content in art" and "form and content in science" is pretty much the same.

== Usage in art ==
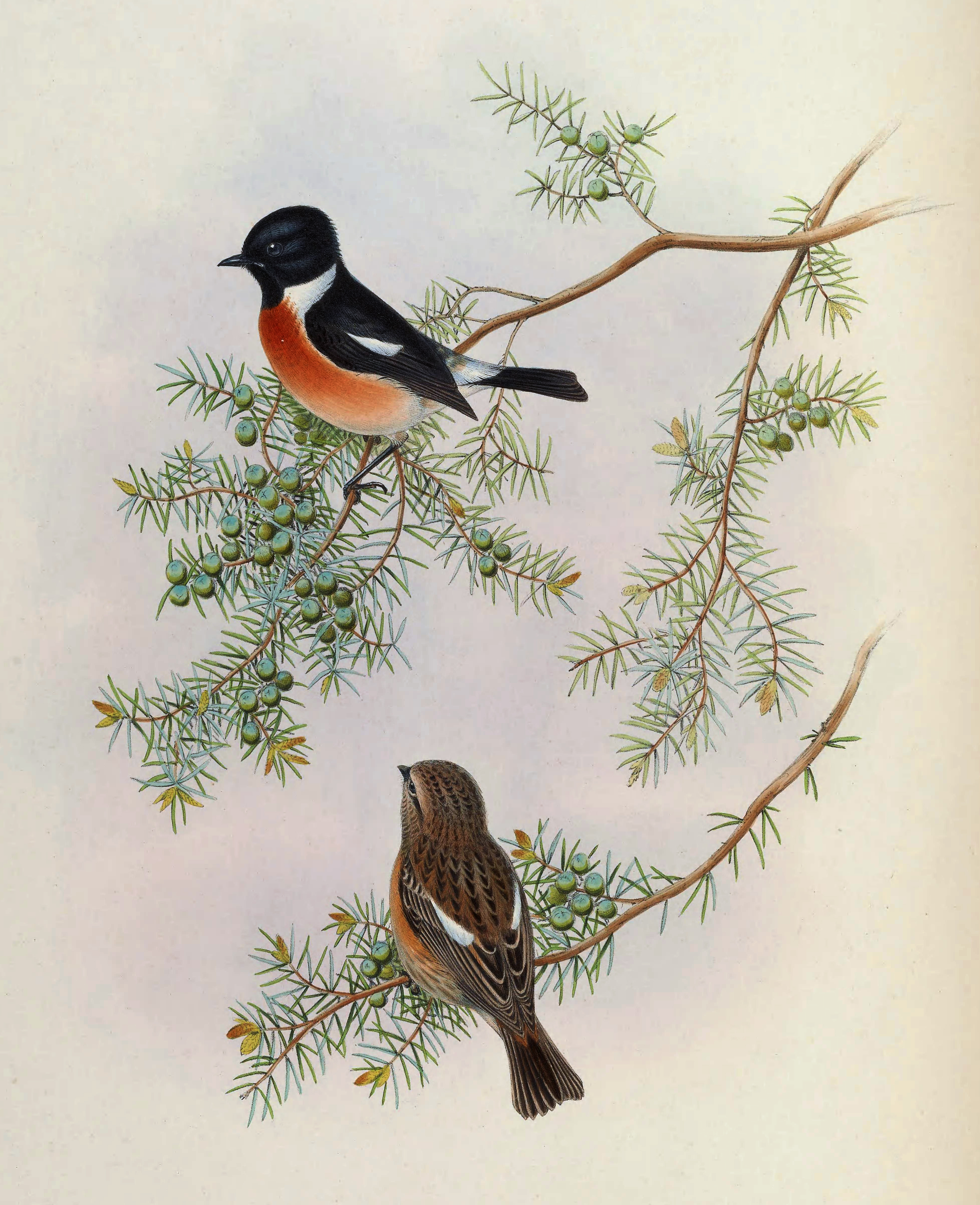
Saxicola maurus indicus on Juniperus formosana - Gould

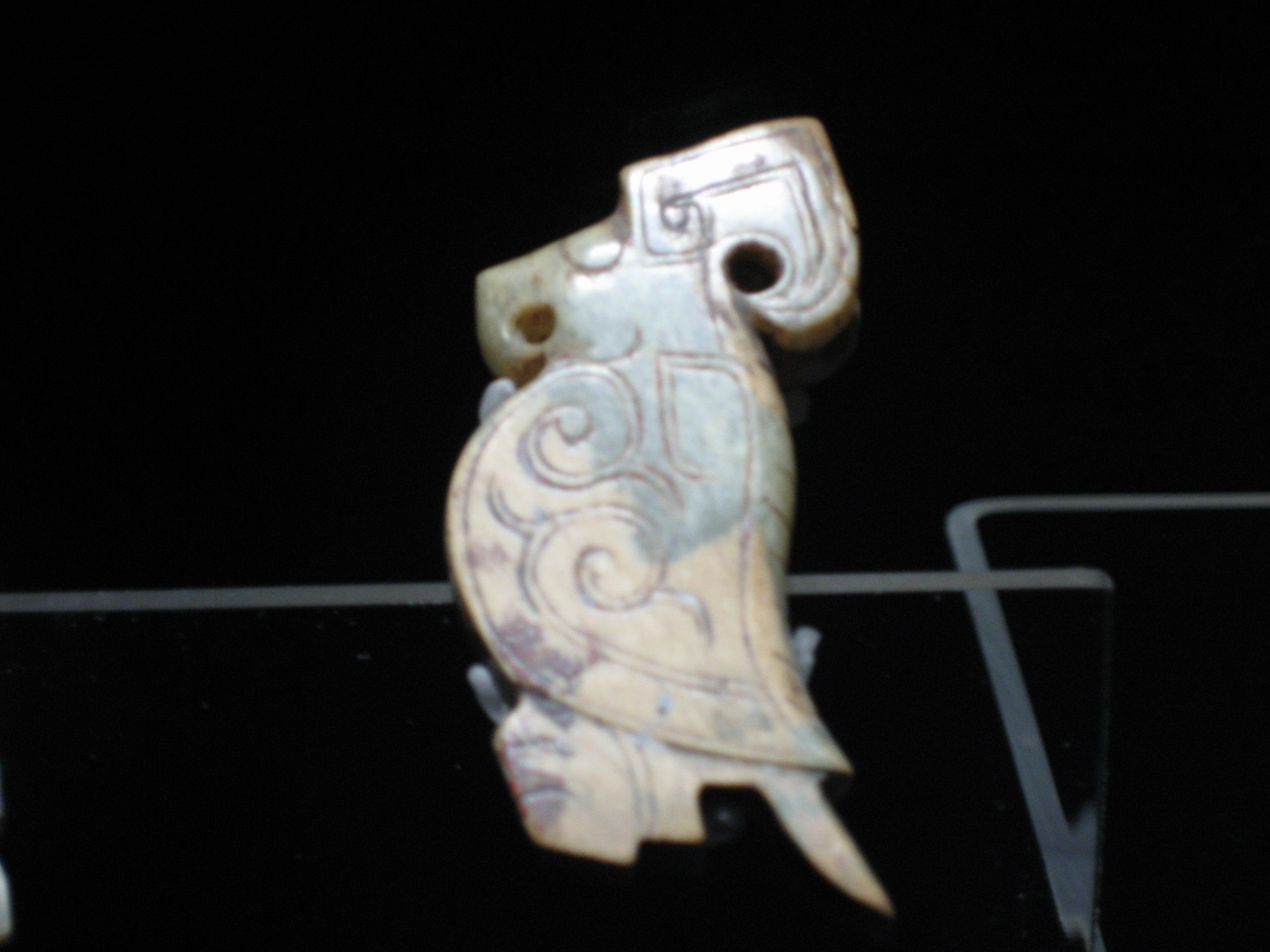
Jade bird

Form is one of the most frequent terms in literary criticism. It is often used merely to designate a genre or for patterns of meter lines and rhymes. For example, the subject of these two artworks is a bird, though both artworks are created in different styles. One is a two-dimensional artwork of two birds resting on a tree branch, created in a natural style, with realistic proportions. On the other hand, the jade bird carving, created with exaggerated proportions and a stylized expression, creates a different emotional content. In other words, the "content" of the artwork changes based on the artist's decisions on the use of form.

== See also ==
- Dichotomy – Partition into two separate parts
- Dilemma – Problem requiring a choice between equally undesirable alternatives
- Dualism – Division into two principles or kinds
- Formalism (philosophy) – Concept of focusing on form over concept
- Form follows function – Design philosophy of 19th–20th centuries
- Found object – Non-standard material used in work of art
- Found object (music) – Classification of musical instruments
- L'art pour l'art – Slogan for art without any didactic, moral or utilitarian function
- Mimesis – Communication by means of imitation
- Organic unity – Concept in philosophy
- Sense and reference – Distinction in the philosophy of language
- The medium is the message – Phrase in communication theory
- Unity of opposites – Central category of dialectics
- Universal (metaphysics) – Characteristic or qualities that particular things have in common; and Particular – Concept in metaphysics
