= William K. Wimsatt =

American professor of literature

William Kurtz Wimsatt Jr.
- Born: November 17, 1907; Washington, D.C., U.S.
- Died: December 17, 1975 (aged 68); New Haven, Connecticut, U.S.

Academic work
- Institutions: Yale University

William Kurtz Wimsatt Jr. (November 17, 1907 – December 17, 1975) was an American professor of English, literary theorist, and critic. Wimsatt is often associated with the concept of the intentional fallacy, which he developed with Monroe Beardsley in order to question the importance of an author's intentions for the creation of a work of art.

== Life and career ==
Wimsatt was born in Washington D.C., attended Georgetown University and, later, Yale University, where he received his PhD In 1939, Wimsatt joined the English department at Yale, where he taught until his death in 1975. During his lifetime, Wimsatt became known for his studies of eighteenth-century literature (Leitch et al. 1372). He wrote many works of literary theory and criticism such as The Prose Style of Samuel Johnson (1941) and Philosophic Words: A Study of Style and Meaning in the "Rambler" and "Dictionary" of Samuel Johnson (1948; Leitch et al. 1372). His major works include The Verbal Icon: Studies in the Meaning of Poetry (1954); Hateful Contraries (1965) and Literary Criticism: A Short History (1957, with Cleanth Brooks). Wimsatt was considered crucial to New Criticism (particularly New Formalist Criticism; Leitch et al. 1372). He was a member of the Connecticut Academy of Arts and Sciences.

== Influences ==
Wimsatt was influenced by Monroe Beardsley, with whom he wrote some of his most important pieces. Wimsatt also drew on the work of both ancient critics, such as Longinus and Aristotle, and some of his own contemporaries, such as T. S. Eliot and the writers of the Chicago School, to formulate his theories, often by highlighting key ideas in those authors' works in order to refute them.

== Influence ==
Wimsatt's ideas have affected the development of reader-response criticism and his influence has been noted in the works of writers such as Stanley Fish. Wimsatt's ideas have been disputed in works such as Walter Benn Michaels' and Steven Knapp’s “Against Theory” (Leitch et al. 1373-1374).

== Approach ==
Wimsatt was interviewed, along with Walter J. Ong of Saint Louis University, by Sheila Hough in 1964. (Professor Wimsatt had received an honorary doctorate from Saint Louis University in 1963.) Hough asked Professor Wimsatt a question that still resonates today: "Is literature taught in complete isolation from its author, Mr. Wimsatt -- don't you consider the person who wrote it?"

Wimsatt replied: "I do, of course. Your question, I think, was prompted by that very fine essay of Father Ong's, 'The Jinnee in the Well-Wrought Urn,' which you read in his book The Barbarian Within [1962: 15-25]. It first appeared in Essays in Criticism at Oxford some years ago [1954], and was in part, I believe, an answer to an essay written many years ago, about twenty at least, by a friend of mine, Monroe Beardsley, and myself, called 'The Intentional Fallacy.' I would like to pay Father Ong the compliment of saying that I think that his essay 'The Jinnee in the Well-Wrought Urn' is the only sensible response that has ever been written to that essay of ours."

As a staunch formalist critic, Wimsatt believed in the authority of the poem: any analysis of a poem must centre on the text itself (Leitch et al. 1371-1372). He outlines and advocates (particularly in his two influential essays written with Monroe Beardsley, “The Intentional Fallacy” and “The Affective Fallacy”) an “objective criticism” in which the critic essentially disregards the intentions of the poet and the effect of the poem on the audience as the sole (or even the major) factors in analyzing and evaluating a poem (Davis and Schleifer 43).

Wimsatt does allow for a certain degree of variation in the analysis of poetry and does not necessarily contend that there is only one possible reading for any given poem. He allows, for example, for what he calls the “literary sense” of meaning, saying that “no two different words or different phrases ever mean fully the same” (Verbal Icon xii).

Much of his theory, however, appears to stem from an ambivalence towards "impressionism, subjectivism, and relativism” (Leitch et al. 1373) in criticism. In Hateful Contraries, Wimsatt refers to a “New Amateurism,” an “anti-criticism” emerging in works such as Leslie Fiedler’s “Credo,” which appeared in the Kenyon Review. “The only reservation the theorist need have about such critical impressionism or expressionism,” says Wimsatt, “is that, after all, it does not carry on very far in our cogitation about the nature and value of literature…it is not a very mature form of cognitive discourse” (Hateful Contraries xvi).

Indeed, Wimsatt is concerned with ensuring a level of legitimacy in English studies and he sets about doing so by favouring a scientific approach to criticism—even, for example, decrying affective theory as “less a scientific view of literature than a prerogative -- that of the soul adventuring among masterpieces” (Verbal Icon 29).

== Theories ==
Wimsatt contributed several theories to the critical landscape, particularly through his major work, The Verbal Icon (of which some of the ideas are discussed below). His ideas generally centre around the same questions tackled by many critics: what is poetry and how does one evaluate it?

=== Intentional fallacy ===
Perhaps Wimsatt’s most influential theories come from the essays “The Intentional Fallacy” and “The Affective Fallacy” (both are published in Verbal Icon) which he wrote with Monroe Beardsley. Each of these texts “codifies a crucial tenet of New Critical formalist orthodoxy,” making them both very important to twentieth-century criticism (Leitch et al. 1371).

The Intentional Fallacy, according to Wimsatt, derives from “confusion between the poem and its origins” (Verbal Icon 21) – essentially, it occurs when a critic puts too much emphasis on personal, biographical, or what he calls “external” information when analyzing a work (they note that this is essentially the same as the “Genetic fallacy” in philosophical studies; 21). Wimsatt and Beardsley consider this strategy a fallacy partly because it is impossible to determine the intention of the author — indeed, authors themselves are often unable to determine the “intention” of a poem — and partly because a poem, as an act that takes place between a poet and an audience, has an existence outside of both and thus its meaning can not be evaluated simply based on the intentions of or the effect on either the writer or the audience (see the section of this article entitled “The Affective Fallacy" for a discussion of the latter; 5). For Wimsatt and Beardsley, intentional criticism becomes subjective criticism, and so ceases to be criticism at all. For them, critical inquiries are resolved through evidence in and of the text — not “by consulting the oracle” (18).

=== Affective fallacy ===
The Affective fallacy (identified in the essay of the same name, which Wimsatt co-authored with Monroe Beardsley, as above) refers to “confusion between the poem and its results” (Verbal Icon 21; italics in original). It refers to the error of placing too much emphasis on the effect that a poem has on its audience when analyzing it.

Wimsatt and Beardsley argue that the effect of poetic language alone is an unreliable way to analyze poetry because, they contend, words have no effect in and of themselves, independent of their meaning. It is impossible, then, for a poem to be “pure emotion” (38), which means that a poem’s meaning is not “equivalent to its effects, especially its emotional impact, on the reader” (Leitch et al. 1371).

As with the Intentional fallacy, engaging in affective criticism is too subjective an exercise to really warrant the label “criticism” at all — thus, for Wimsatt and Beardsley, it is a fallacy of analysis.

=== Concrete Universal ===
In “The Concrete Universal,” Wimsatt attempts to determine how specific or general (i.e., concrete or universal) a verbal representation must be in order to achieve a particular effect. What is the difference, for example, between referring to a “purple cow” and a “tan cow with a broken horn” (Verbal Icon 74)? In addressing such questions, Wimsatt attempts to resolve what it is that makes poetry different from other forms of communication, concluding that “what distinguishes poetry from scientific or logical discourse is a degree of concreteness which does not contribute anything to the argument but is somehow enjoyable or valuable for its own sake.” For Wimsatt, poetry is “the vehicle of a metaphor which one boards heedless of where it runs, whether cross-town or downtown — just for the ride” (76).

=== The Domain of Criticism ===
In “The Domain of Criticism,” Wimsatt “[defends] the domain of poetry and poetics from the encircling (if friendly) arm of the general aesthetician" (Verbal Icon 221) – that is, he discusses the problems with discussing poetry in purely aesthetic terms. Wimsatt questions the ability of a poem to function aesthetically in the same way as a painting or sculpture. For one, visual modes such as sculpture or painting are undertaken using materials that directly correlate with the object they represent — at least in terms of their “beauty.” A beautiful painting of an apple, for example, is done with beautiful paint.

Verbal expression, however, does not function this way — as Wimsatt points out, there is no such thing as a “beautiful” or “ugly” word (or, at least, there is no general consensus as to how to apply such concepts in such a context; 228). There is no correlation between words and their subject, at least in terms of aesthetics — “the example of the dunghill (or equivalent object) beautifully described is one of the oldest in literary discussion” (228).

More importantly, language does not function merely on the level of its effects on the senses, as (for example) visual modes do. A poem does not just derive its meaning from its rhyme and meter, but these are the domains of aesthetics (231) — to analyse poetry on the basis of its aesthetics, then, is insufficient if one is to adequately explore its meaning.

== Major works ==
=== The Verbal Icon: Studies in the Meaning of Poetry ===
Written as a series of independent essays between 1941 and 1952, The Verbal Icon was finally published as a cohesive work (after Wimsatt revised some of the original versions) in 1954. Probably his most influential work, The Verbal Icon contains two of Wimsatt's most important essays, “The Intentional Fallacy” and “The Affective Fallacy” (co-authored with Monroe Beardsley). Paul de Man offers a significant critique of Wimsatt's text, taken as an example of the understanding of the notion of 'autonomy' in New Criticism, in Blindness and Insight.

=== Hateful Contraries: Studies in Literature and Criticism ===
Apparently concerned with the (admittedly lessened) influence of what he calls “Amateur Criticism,” Wimsatt published Hateful Contraries in 1965 as a way to “distinguish what [he] consider[s] an inevitable and proper literary interest in the contraries” (Hateful Contraries xviii). Through studies of works by T. S. Eliot as well as discussions of topics such as “The Augustan Mode in English Poetry” and “The Criticism of Comedy” (xi), Wimsatt attempts to add to the efforts to justify and improve literary criticism (xix).

=== Literary Criticism: A Short History ===
Written with Cleanth Brooks in 1957, Literary Criticism: A Short History is intended as “a history of ideas about verbal art and about its elucidation and criticism” (Wimsatt and Brooks ix). The authors attempt to contribute to the “intelligibility in the history of literary argument” as well as “contributes to a distinct point of view,” which, they argue, is a necessary part of any historical literary studies (vii).
