= Authorial intent =

Author's intent as it is encoded in their work

In literary theory and aesthetics, authorial intent is an author's intent as it is encoded in their work. Authorial intentionalism is the hermeneutical view that an author's intentions should constrain the ways in which a text is properly interpreted. Opponents, who dispute its hermeneutical importance, label this position the intentional fallacy and count it among the informal fallacies.

There are two types of intentionalism: Actual Intentionalism and Hypothetical Intentionalism. Actual Intentionalism is the standard intentionalist view that the meaning of a work is dependent on authorial intent. Hypothetical Intentionalism is a more recent view; it views the meaning of a work as being what an ideal reader would hypothesize the writer's intent to have been—for hypothetical intentionalism, it is ultimately the hypothesis of the reader, not the truth, that matters.

== Types of actual intentionalism ==
=== Extreme intentionalism ===
Extreme intentionalism, the classic and most substantial form of intentionalism, holds that the meaning of a text is determined solely by the author's intent when they create that work. As C.S. Lewis wrote in his book An Experiment in Criticism, "The first demand any work of art makes upon us is surrender. Look. Listen. Receive. Get yourself out of the way." This position acknowledges that such can apply only when what the author intends to convey can actually be conveyed by the language that they use. If an author uses words that cannot, by any reasonable interpretation, possibly mean what they intend, then the work is simply random noise and meaningless nonsense.

A prominent proponent of this view is E.D. Hirsch, who in his influential book Validity in Interpretation (1967) argues for "the sensible belief that a text means what its author meant". Hirsch contends that the meaning of a text is an ideal entity that exists in the author's mind, and the task of interpretation is to reconstruct and represent that intended meaning as accurately as possible. Hirsch proposes utilizing sources like the author's other writings, biographical information, and the historical/cultural context to discern the author's intentions. Hirsch notes a fundamental distinction between the meaning of a text, which does not change over time, and the significance of the text, which does change over time.

Extreme intentionalism holds that authorial intention is the only way to determine the true meaning even in the face of claims that "the author often does not know what he means". Hirsch answers said objection by distinguishing authorial intent from subject matter. Hirsch argues that when a reader claims to understand an author's meaning better than the author themselves, what is really happening is that a reader understands the subject matter better than the author; so the reader might more articulately explain the author's meaning—but what the author intended is still the meaning of the text they wrote. Hirsch further addresses the related claim that authors may have unconscious meanings come out in their creative processes by using various arguments to assert that such subconscious processes are still part of the author, and so part of the author's intent and meaning, for "How can an author mean something he did not mean?"

Kathleen Stock's book Only Imagine: Fiction, Interpretation, and Imagination (2017) takes an extreme intentionalist stance specific to fictional works. She argues that for fictional content to exist in a text, the author must have intended the reader to imagine that content. The reader recognizes this authorial intention and uses it as a constraint on what is properly imagined from the text.

=== Weak intentionalism ===
Weak intentionalism (also called moderate intentionalism) takes a more moderate stance and incorporates some insights from reader-response; it acknowledges the importance of authorial intent while also allowing for meanings derived from readers' interpretations. As articulated by Mark Bevir in The Logic of the History of Ideas (1999), weak intentionalists see meanings as necessarily intentional, but the relevant intentions can come from either authors or readers.

Bevir argues that texts do not contain intrinsic meanings separable from the minds interpreting them. Meaning arises from the intentions of the person engaging with the text—whether that is the author producing it or a reader consuming it. However, Bevir privileges the author's intentions as the starting point for interpretation, which then opens up a space for negotiating meanings with readers' perspectives.

Other proponents of weak intentionalism include P.D. Juhl in Interpretation: An Essay in the Philosophy of Literary Criticism (1980). Juhl contends that while authorial intentions provide the central guiding principle, interpretations can legitimately go beyond those original intentions based on the text's public meaning and critics' insights.

=== Cambridge School conventionalism ===
The Cambridge School of conventionalist hermeneutics, a position most elaborated by Quentin Skinner, might be aligned as somewhat similar to weak intentionalism. Central to Cambridge School conventionalism is the idea that to understand what a text means, one must understand the context in which a text was written; this includes political, social, linguistic, historical, and even economic contexts that would influence how a text was intended and received. While not dismissing the role of authorial intent, the Cambridge School heavily emphasizes examining how the text interacted with—and responded to—its particular contextual situation. The Cambridge School believes that meaning emerges from scrutinizing the complex interplay between the words on the page and the contextual factors surrounding its creation.

One of the Cambridge School's distinguishing ideas is the concept of "speech acts". Drawing on the philosophy of language, particularly the work of J.L. Austin and John Searle, the Cambridge School argues that language not only communicates information but also performs actions. For instance: when a politician declares war, they are not merely stating a fact, they are also performing an action through their speech.

Similarly, when a betrothed couple say "I do" they are not merely reporting their internal states of mind, they are performing an action—namely, to get married. The intended force of "I do" in such a circumstance can only be comprehended by an observer when they understand the meaning and complexity of the social activity of marriage. Thus, according to the Cambridge School, to understand a text, a reader must understand the linguistic and social conventions that would have been operative at the time the text was produced.

Since speech-acts are always legible—because they are done by the speech/text itself—the Cambridge School presupposes no knowledge about the author's mental state. For Cambridge School conventionalists, the task is: to, with as much contextual information as possible, establish which conventions a text was interacting with at the time of its creation; from there, the author's intent may be inferred and understood.

Mark Bevir, while praising some aspects of the Cambridge School, criticizes it for taking the importance of context too far. He acknowledges context as highly useful and a good heuristic maxim, but not as strictly necessary for understanding a text.

== Objections to actual intentionalism ==
Intentionalism is opposed by various schools of literary theory that may generally be grouped under the heading of anti-intentionalism. Anti-intentionalism maintains that a work's meaning is entirely determined by linguistic and literary conventions and rejects the relevance of authorial intent.

Anti-intentionalism began with the work of William K. Wimsatt and Monroe Beardsley when they coauthored the seminal paper The Intentional Fallacy in 1946. In it, they argued that once a work was published, it had an objective status; its meanings belonged to, and were governed by, the reading public. The work existed as a stand-alone object not dependent upon authorial intent. The problem with authorial intent was that it required private knowledge about the author; to know what the author intended, a reader would have to learn contextual knowledge that existed outside of the work. Such outside knowledge might be interesting for historians, but it is irrelevant when judging the work for itself.

One of the most famous critiques of intentionalism was the 1967 essay The Death of the Author by Roland Barthes. In it, he argued that once a work was published, it became disconnected from the author's intentions and open to perpetual re-interpretation by successive readers across different contexts. He stated: "To give a text an Author is to impose a limit on that text, to furnish it with a final signified, to close the writing." For Barthes, and other post-structuralists like Jacques Derrida, the author's intentions were unknowable and irrelevant to the constantly shifting interpretations produced by readers.

== Alternatives to actual intentionalism ==
=== New Criticism ===
New Criticism, as espoused by Cleanth Brooks, W. K. Wimsatt, T. S. Eliot, and others, argued that authorial intent is irrelevant to understanding a work of literature; the objective meaning is to be found in the pure text itself. Wimsatt and Monroe Beardsley argue in their essay The Intentional Fallacy that "the design or intention of the author is neither available nor desirable as a standard for judging the success of a work of literary art". The author, they argue, cannot be reconstructed from a writing—the text is the primary source of meaning, and any details of the author's desires or life are secondary. Wimsatt and Beardsley argue that even details about the work's composition or the author's intended meaning and purpose that might be found in other documents such as journals or letters are "private or idiosyncratic; not a part of the work as a linguistic fact" and are thus secondary to the trained reader's rigorous engagement with the text itself.

Wimsatt and Beardsley divide the evidence used in making interpretations of poetry (although their analysis can be applied equally well to any type of art) into three categories:

Internal (or public) evidence
Internal evidence refers to what is presented within a given work. This internal evidence includes strong familiarity with the conventions of language and literature: it "is discovered through the semantics and syntax of a poem, through our habitual knowledge of the language, through grammars, dictionaries, and all the literature which is the source of dictionaries, in general through all that makes a language and culture". Analyzing a work of art based on internal evidence will not result in the intentional fallacy.

External (or private) evidence
What is not literally contained in the work itself is external to that work, including all private or public statements that the artist has made about the work of art, whether in conversations, letters, journals, or other sources. Evidence of this type is directly concerned with what the artist may have intended to do even or especially when it is not apparent from the work itself. Analyzing a work of art based on external evidence will likely result in the intentional fallacy.

Intermediate evidence
The third type of evidence, intermediate evidence, includes "private or semiprivate meanings attached to words or topics by an author or by a coterie of which he is a member." Also included are "the history of words" and "the biography of an author, his use of a word, and the associations which the word had for him." Wimsatt and Beardsley argue for the use of intermediate evidence rather than external evidence in the interpretation of a literary work, but they recognize that these two types of evidence "shade into one another so subtly that it is not always easy to draw a line between" the two.

Thus, a text's internal evidence—the words themselves and their meanings—is open for literary analysis. External evidence—anything not contained within the text itself, such as statements made by the poet about the poem that is being interpreted—does not belong to literary criticism. Preoccupation with the authorial intent "leads away from the poem." According to Wimsatt and Beardsley, a poem does not belong to its author but rather "is detached from the author at birth and goes about the world beyond his power to intend about it or control it. The poem belongs to the public."

=== Reader-response ===
Reader-response rejects New Criticism's attempt to find an objective meaning via the text itself; instead, it denies the stability and accessibility of meaning completely. It rejects ideological approaches to literary texts that attempt to impose a lens through which a text is to be understood. Reader-response argues that literature should be viewed as a performing art in which each reader creates their own, possibly unique, text-related performance. The approach avoids subjectivity or essentialism in descriptions produced through its recognition that reading is determined by textual and also cultural constraints.

Reader-response critics view authorial intent in various ways. In general, they have argued that the author's intent itself is immaterial and cannot be fully recovered. However, the author's intent will shape the text and limit the possible interpretations of a work. The reader's impression of the author's intent is a working force in interpretation, but the author's actual intent is not. Some critics in this school believe that reader-response is a transaction and that there is some form of negotiation going on between authorial intent and reader's response. According to Michael Smith and Peter Rabinowitz, this approach is not simply about the question “What does this mean to me?” because if that were the case, the power of the text to transform is given up.

=== Post-structuralism ===
In post-structuralism, there are a variety of approaches to authorial intent. For some of the theorists deriving from Jacques Lacan, and in particular theories variously called écriture féminine, gender and sex predetermine the ways that texts will emerge, and the language of textuality itself will present an argument that is potentially counter to the author's conscious intent.

=== Hypothetical intentionalism ===
Hypothetical intentionalism, in contrast to the above anti-intentionalist approaches, attempts to account for the criticisms of actual intentionalism and then draw a moderated middle path between actual intentionalism and anti-intentionalism. It is an interpretive strategy that navigates between assuming a writer's actual intent and disregarding intent altogether, focusing instead on the best hypothesis of intent as understood by a qualified audience. This approach prioritizes the perspective of an intended or ideal audience, which employs public knowledge and context to infer the author's intentions. Hypothetical intentionalism holds that, because the reader's reasonable hypothesis of the authorial intent is paramount, even if new evidence were to come out that revealed a reader's (previously reasonable) hypothesis was factually incorrect, the reader's hypothesis would still be considered correct; if a hypothetical reading is warranted and reasonable, it is valid regardless of the actual truth of the author's intent.

Terry Barrett espouses a somewhat similar concept when he says that, "the meaning of a work of art is not limited to the meaning the artist had in mind when making the work; it can mean more or less or something different than the artist intended the work to mean." Barrett states that to rely on the artist's intent for an interpretation of an artwork is to put oneself in a passive role as a viewer. Reliance on the artists’ intent unwisely removes the responsibility of interpretation from the viewer; it also robs the viewer of the joy of interpretive thinking and the rewards of the new insights it yields into the art and the world.

== In textual criticism ==
Authorial intention is of great practical concern to some textual critics. These are known as intentionalists and are identified with the Bowers-Tanselle school of thought. Their editions have as one of their most important goals the recovery of the author's intentions (generally final intentions). When preparing a work for the press, an editor working along the principles outlined by Fredson Bowers and G. Thomas Tanselle will attempt to construct a text that is close to the author's final intentions. For transcription and typesetting, authorial intentionality can be considered paramount.

An intentionalist editor would constantly investigate the documents for traces of authorial intention. On one hand, it can be argued that the author always intends whatever the author writes and that at different points in time the same author might have very different intentions. On the other hand, an author may in some cases write something they did not intend. For example, an intentionalist would consider for emendation the following cases:

- The authorial manuscript misspells a word: an error in intention, it is usually assumed. Editorial procedures for works available in no 'authorized editions' (and even those are not always exempt) often specify correcting such errors.
- The authorial manuscript presents what appears to be a misformat of the text: a sentence has been left in run-on form. It is assumed that the author might have regretted not beginning a new paragraph, but did not see this problem until afterwards, until rereading.
- The authorial manuscript presents a factual error.

In cases such as these where the author is living, they would be questioned by the editor who would then adhere to the intention expressed. In cases where the author is deceased, an intentionalist would attempt to approach authorial intention. The strongest voices countering an emphasis on authorial intent in scholarly editing have been D. F. McKenzie and Jerome McGann, proponents of a model that accounts for the "social text," tracing material transformations and embodiments of works while not privileging one version over another.

== See also ==
- Appeal to motive – Questioning the motives of the proposer
- Canonical criticism
- Implied author
- Original intent
- Paul de Man
- Tendenz
- The Death of the Author
