= Monroe Beardsley =

American philosopher of art

- Born: December 10, 1915; Bridgeport, Connecticut, U.S.
- Died: September 18, 1985 (aged 69); Philadelphia, Pennsylvania, U.S.

Education
- Education: Yale University (B.A., 1936; Ph.D., 1939)

Philosophical work
- Main interests: Philosophy of art
- Notable works: "The Intentional Fallacy" "The Affective Fallacy"

Monroe Curtis Beardsley (/ˈbɪərdzli/ BEERDZ-lee; December 10, 1915 – September 18, 1985) was an American philosopher of art.

== Biography ==
Beardsley was born and raised in Bridgeport, Connecticut, and educated at Yale University (B.A. 1936, Ph.D. 1939), where he received the John Addison Porter Prize. He taught at a number of colleges and universities, including Mount Holyoke College and Yale University, but most of his career was spent at Swarthmore College (22 years) and Temple University (16 years). His wife and occasional coauthor, Elizabeth Lane Beardsley, was also a philosopher at Temple.

His work in aesthetics is best known for its championing of the instrumentalist theory of art and the concept of aesthetic experience. Beardsley was elected president of the American Society for Aesthetics in 1956. Among literary critics, Beardsley is known for two essays written with W. K. Wimsatt, "The Intentional Fallacy" and "The Affective Fallacy," both key texts of New Criticism. His books include: Practical Logic (1950), Aesthetics (1958) (an introductory text), and Aesthetics: A Short History (1966). He also edited a well-regarded survey anthology of philosophy, The European Philosophers from Descartes to Nietzsche. He was elected a Fellow of the American Academy of Arts and Sciences in 1976.

He and his wife were over-all series editors for Prentice-Hall's "Foundations of Philosophy," a series of textbooks on different fields within philosophy, written in most cases by leading scholars in those fields.

== See also ==
- American philosophy
- List of American philosophers
