= The Well Wrought Urn =

1947 essay collection by Cleanth Brooks

- First edition
- Author: Cleanth Brooks
- Cover artist: Paul Rand
- Genre: Essay collection
- Publisher: Harvest
- Publication date: 1947

The Well Wrought Urn: Studies in the Structure of Poetry is a 1947 collection of essays by Cleanth Brooks. It is considered a seminal text in the New Critical school of literary criticism. The title contains an allusion to the fourth stanza of John Donne's poem, "The Canonization", which is the primary subject of the first chapter of the book.

== Introduction ==
The Well Wrought Urn is divided into eleven chapters, ten of which attempt close readings of celebrated English poems from verses in Shakespeare's Macbeth to Yeats's "Among School Children". The eleventh, famous chapter, entitled "The Heresy of Paraphrase", is a polemic against the use of paraphrase in describing and criticizing a poem. This chapter is followed by two appendices: "Criticism, History, and Critical Relativism" and "The Problem of Belief". Most of the book's contents had been previously published before 1947, and the position it articulates is not significantly different from Brooks's earlier books, Understanding Poetry and Modern Poetry and the Tradition. The unique contribution of The Well Wrought Urn is that it combines the close reading analysis of the previous volumes while answering some of the criticism directed at Brooks's theory.

The book was written in reaction to a prominent stream of literary criticism: the historicist/biographical. This interprets each poetic work within the context of the historical period from which it emerged. Because literary tastes change so much over time, it seems reasonable to the historicist to evaluate each writer according to the standards of their own age. Brooks vehemently rejected this historical relativism, believing it amounts to "giving up our criteria of good and bad" and thus repudiating "our concept of poetry itself". Brooks opts instead to offer "universal judgments" of poems and treat them as self-contained entities, able to be interpreted without recourse to historical or biographical information. As H.L. Heilman writes,

to declare the literary work self-contained or autonomous was less to deny its connections with the nonliterary human world, past and present, than to assert metaphorically the presence in the poem of suprahistorical uniqueness along with the generic or the hereditary or the culturally influenced.

By distinguishing the "supra-historical" from the "non-historical," Heilman highlights an important, and often misunderstood distinction in New Criticism. This is that Brooks and the New Critics did not discount the study of the historical context of the literary work, nor its affective potential for the reader, nor its connection to the life experiences of the author. As he wrote in his essay The Formalist Critics, such study is valuable, but should not be confused with criticism of the work itself. It can be performed as validly for bad works as good ones. In fact, it can be performed for any expression, nonliterary or literary. Thus a historical/biographical study of literature fails on two counts: it cannot tell good literature from bad, and cannot distinguish literature from other cultural productions.

== Close reading ==
The bulk of the book is devoted to close reading of poems by John Donne, Shakespeare, Milton, Alexander Pope, William Wordsworth, Keats, Lord Tennyson, Yeats, Thomas Gray, and T. S. Eliot. In The Well Wrought Urn, theory illuminates practice and vice versa. The poems are meant to be "the concrete examples on which generalizations are to be based". Thus the first chapter tells us in its title that poetic language is "The Language of Paradox".

It is a language in which the connotations play as great a part as the denotations. And I do not mean that the connotations are important as supplying some sort of frill or trimming, something external to the real matter in hand. I mean that the poet does not use a notation at all—as the science may be properly be said to do so. The poet, within limits, has to make his language as he goes.

Unlike the scientist, who seeks to cleanse his work of all ambiguity, the poet thrives on it because with it he can better express experience. The rest of the first chapter is devoted to the close reading of Donne's "The Canonization". Brooks in his interpretation challenges the conception of Donne as being an early example of the use of eccentric metaphor, anticipating Yeats and Eliot, instead asserting that he is an extreme example of what all good poetry exemplifies, namely, paradox. Brooks does this by comparing the symbolic imagery of Donne's verse with that of Shakespeare in Macbeth.

In order to prove that the language of poetry is paradox, he must treat poems that have traditionally been thought straightforward. He takes Herrick's poem, "Corinna's going a-Maying", and reveals that the speaker in the poem has a complex attitude toward his carpe diem theme. In doing so, Brooks brings up another central tenet of his critical theory, one which he will deal with more explicitly in the coming chapters: the notion that no true poem can ever be reduced to its paraphrasable prose content.

In a similar vein, Brooks analyzes Thomas Gray's "Elegy Written in a Country Churchyard". The message of this poem seems straightforward and was duplicated by many other "graveyard" poems of the late eighteenth century. Therefore, according to Brooks, what makes it one of the most famous in the English language cannot be the poem's message. Brooks instead focuses on the poem's dramatic context as the source of its power.

The most famous and best-known application of this doctrine of dramatic appropriateness is Brooks's analysis of Keats's "Ode on a Grecian Urn". Widely considered to be one of his best poems, Keats's "Ode" ends on what many think a sententious note with its proclamation that "Beauty is truth, truth beauty." But Brooks sees this as dramatically appropriate; it is a paradox that cannot be understood except in terms of the entire poem, if we take seriously Keats's metaphor of the urn as a dramatic speaker.

Part of the intent of The Well Wrought Urn is to dispel the criticism that Brooks in his earlier works had dismissed the eighteenth and nineteenth century English poets, particularly the Romantics. Brooks thus includes "Intimations of Immortality" by Wordsworth and "Tears, Idle Tears" by Tennyson along with the Pope, Gray, and Keats poems. He claims that Wordsworth and Tennyson frequently wrote better (i.e., more paradoxically) than even they were aware. Wordsworth sought to write directly and forcefully, without sophistry or wordplay. But his language is, according to Brooks, nevertheless paradoxical. For example, Brooks takes the opening lines of Wordsworth's sonnet, "It is a Beauteous Evening, Calm and Free:"

It is a beauteous evening, calm and free,

The holy time is quiet as a Nun,

Breathless with adoration...

Brooks points out that while the evening is described as quiet and calm, it is also breathless with apparent excitement. There is no final contradiction between this kind of excitement and this kind of calm, but the meanings of the two phrases are being modified by each other, moving away from their purely denotative meaning. This is a good example of what "paradox" means to Brooks: the poet expresses himself in words that are metaphorical and thus protean in their meaning, that contradict one another because of their connotations.

Brooks thus uses the same criteria to analyze and judge these poems as he did for the modern and metaphysical verse. This was a rejection of the typical method of interpretation for these poets, which is to judge them by the Romantic standards of their day and in the light of their biographies.

== "The Heresy of Paraphrase" ==
In his summary chapter, Brooks articulates his position that it is "heresy" to paraphrase a poem when trying to get at its meaning. Poems are not simply "messages" expressed in flowery language. The language is crucial in determining the message; form is content. Thus to try to abstract the meaning of a poem from the language in which that meaning is rooted, the paradoxical language of metaphor, is to disregard the internal structure of the poem that gives it its meaning. The temptation to think of poetry as prose draped in poetic language is strong simply because both are composed with words and differ only in that poetry has meter and rhyme. But Brooks instead wants us to see poetry as like music, a ballet, or a play:

The structure of a poem resembles that of a ballet or musical composition. It is a pattern of resolutions and balances and harmonizations, developed through a temporal scheme...most of us are less inclined to force the concept of 'statement' on drama than on a lyric poem; for the very nature of drama is that of something 'acted out'—something which arrives at its conclusion through conflict—something which builds conflict into its very being.

The poem is a "working out of the various tensions—set up by whatever means-by propositions, metaphors, symbols". It achieves a resolution through this working out of tensions, not necessarily a logical resolution but a satisfactory unification of different "attitudes", or dispositions towards experience. Therefore, any intellectual proposition within the poem must be viewed in the context of all the other propositions expressed in the highly changeable language of metaphor. The poem does not try to find the truth-value of a particular idea; it tries to juxtapose many, contradictory ideas together and reach a sort of resolution. The poet is trying to "unify experience" by making poetry not a statement about experience but an experience itself, with all the contradictory elements contained in one cultural expression, i.e., the poem.

== See also ==
- 1947 in poetry
