= New Criticism =

Formalist movement in literary theory

New Criticism was a formalist movement in literary theory that dominated American literary criticism in the middle decades of the 20th century. It emphasized close reading, particularly of poetry, to discover how a work of literature functioned as a self-contained, self-referential aesthetic object. The movement derived its name from John Crowe Ransom's 1941 book The New Criticism.

The works of Cambridge scholar I. A. Richards, especially his Practical Criticism, The Principles of Literary Criticism and The Meaning of Meaning, which offered what was claimed to be an empirical scientific approach, were important to the development of a New Critical methodology. Cleanth Brooks, John Crowe Ransom, W. K. Wimsatt, and Monroe Beardsley also made significant contributions to New Criticism. It was Wimsatt and Beardsley who introduced the ideas of intentional fallacy and affective fallacy. Also very influential were the critical essays of T. S. Eliot, such as "Tradition and the Individual Talent" and "Hamlet and His Problems", in which Eliot developed his notions of the "theory of impersonality" and "objective correlative" respectively. Eliot's evaluative judgments, such as his condemnation of John Milton and John Dryden, his liking for the so-called metaphysical poets, and his insistence that poetry must be impersonal, greatly influenced the formation of the New Critical canon.

== Formalism theory ==
New Criticism developed as a reaction to the older philological and literary history schools of New England, which focused on the history and meaning of individual words and their relation to foreign and ancient languages, comparative sources, and the biographical circumstances of the authors, taking this approach under the influence of nineteenth-century German scholarship. The New Critics felt that this approach tended to distract from the text and meaning of a poem and entirely neglect its aesthetic qualities in favor of teaching about external factors. On the other hand, the New Critics disparaged the literary appreciation school, which limited itself to pointing out the "beauties" and morally elevating qualities of the text, as too subjective and emotional. Condemning this as a version of Romanticism, they aimed for a newer, systematic and objective method.

New Critics believed the structure and meaning of the text were intimately connected and should not be analyzed separately. In order to bring the focus of literary studies back to analysis of the texts, they aimed to exclude the reader's response, the author's intention, historical and cultural contexts, and moralistic bias from their analysis. These goals were articulated in Ransom's "Criticism, Inc." and Allen Tate's "Miss Emily and the Bibliographer".

Close reading (or explication de texte) was a staple of French literary studies, but in the United States, aesthetic concerns and the study of modern poets were the province of non-academic essayists and book reviewers rather than serious scholars. The New Criticism changed this. Though their interest in textual study initially met with resistance from older scholars, the methods of the New Critics rapidly predominated in American universities until challenged by structuralism and post-structuralism in the 1960s and 1970s. Other schools of critical theory including, feminist literary criticism, deconstructionist theory, the New Historicism, and reception theory followed.

Although the New Critics were never a formal group, an important inspiration was the teaching of John Crowe Ransom of Kenyon College, whose students (all Southerners), Allen Tate, Cleanth Brooks, and Robert Penn Warren would go on to develop the aesthetics that came to be known as the New Criticism. Indeed, for Paul Lauter, a professor of American Studies at Trinity College, New Criticism is a reemergence of the Southern Agrarians. In his essay, "The New Criticism", Cleanth Brooks notes that "The New Critic, like the Snark, is a very elusive beast", meaning that there was no clearly defined "New Critical" manifesto, school, or stance. Nevertheless, a number of writings outline inter-related New Critical ideas.

In 1946, William K. Wimsatt and Monroe Beardsley published a classic and controversial New Critical essay entitled "The Intentional Fallacy", in which they argued strongly against the relevance of an author's intention, or "intended meaning" in the analysis of a literary work. For Wimsatt and Beardsley, the words on the page were all that mattered; importation of meanings from outside the text was considered irrelevant, and potentially distracting.

In another essay, "The Affective Fallacy", which served as a kind of sister essay to "The Intentional Fallacy" Wimsatt and Beardsley also discounted the reader's personal/emotional reaction to a literary work as a valid means of analyzing a text. This fallacy would later be repudiated by theorists from the reader-response school of literary theory. One of the leading theorists from this school, Stanley Fish, was himself trained by New Critics. Fish criticizes Wimsatt and Beardsley in his essay "Literature in the Reader" (1970).

The hey-day of the New Criticism in American high schools and colleges was the Cold War decades between 1950 and the mid-seventies. Brooks and Warren's Understanding Poetry and Understanding Fiction both became staples during this era.

Studying a passage of prose or poetry in New Critical style required careful, exacting scrutiny of the passage itself. Formal elements such as rhyme, meter, setting, characterization, and plot were used to identify the theme of the text. In addition to the theme, the New Critics also looked for paradox, ambiguity, irony, and tension to help establish the single best and most unified interpretation of the text.

Although the New Criticism is no longer a dominant theoretical model in American universities, some of its methods (like close reading) are still fundamental tools of literary criticism, underpinning a number of subsequent theoretical approaches to literature including poststructuralism, deconstruction theory, New Testament narrative criticism, and reader-response theory. It has been credited with anticipating the insights of the linguistic turn and for showing significant ideological and historical parallels with logical positivism.

== Criticism ==
It was frequently alleged that the New Criticism treated literary texts as autonomous and divorced from historical context, and that its practitioners were "uninterested in the human meaning, the social function and effect of literature."

Indicative of the reader-response school of theory, Terence Hawkes writes that the fundamental close reading technique is based on the assumption that "the subject and the object of study—the reader and the text—are stable and independent forms, rather than products of the unconscious process of signification," an assumption which he identifies as the "ideology of liberal humanism," which is attributed to the New Critics who are "accused of attempting to disguise the interests at work in their critical processes." For Hawkes, ideally, a critic ought to be considered to "[create] the finished work by his reading of it, and [not to] remain simply an inert consumer of a 'ready-made' product."

In response to critics like Hawkes, Cleanth Brooks, in his essay "The New Criticism" (1979), argued that the New Criticism was not diametrically opposed to the general principles of reader-response theory and that the two could complement one another. For instance, he stated, "If some of the New Critics have preferred to stress the writing rather than the writer, so have they given less stress to the reader—to the reader's response to the work. Yet no one in his right mind could forget the reader. He is essential for 'realizing' any poem or novel. ... Reader response is certainly worth studying." However, Brooks tempers his praise for the reader-response theory by noting its limitations, pointing out that, "to put meaning and valuation of a literary work at the mercy of any and every individual [reader] would reduce the study of literature to reader psychology and to the history of taste."

Another objection against New Criticism is that it misguidedly tries to turn literary criticism into an objective science, or at least aims at "bringing literary study to a condition rivaling that of science." One example of this is Ransom's essay "Criticism, Inc.", in which he advocated that "criticism must become more scientific, or precise and systematic". René Wellek, however, argued against this by noting that a number of the New Critics outlined their theoretical aesthetics in contrast to the "objectivity" of the sciences.

Wellek defended the New Critics in his essay "The New Criticism: Pro and Contra" (1978).

The New Criticism is not supported by feminist theory which is often concerned with sexual identity and the human body. Nor is it aligned with post-colonial theory which deals with dual-identity, personal experience and political bias in writing.

== Important texts ==
- Richards' books Principles of Literary Criticism and Practical Criticism
- William Empson's book Seven Types of Ambiguity
- T.S. Eliot's essays "Tradition and the Individual Talent" and "Hamlet and His Problems"
- Ransom's essays "Criticism, Inc" and "The Ontological Critic"
- Tate's essay "Miss Emily and the Bibliographer"
- Wimsatt and Beardsley's essays "The Intentional Fallacy" and " The Affective Fallacy"
- Brooks' book The Well Wrought Urn: Studies in the Structure of Poetry
- Warren's essay "Pure and Impure Poetry"
- Wellek and Warren's book Theory of Literature

== Sources ==
- Searle, Leroy. "New Criticism" in The Johns Hopkins Guide to Literary Theory, 2nd edition. Edited by Michael Groden, Martin Kreiswirth, and Imre Szeman. Baltimore: The Johns Hopkins University Press, 2005. Available online in PDF from the University of Washington .
- Davis, Garrick. Praising It New. Swallow, 2008. Anthology that includes some of the keys texts of the New Criticism.
