= Cleanth Brooks =

American literary critic and professor

- Born: October 16, 1906; Murray, Kentucky, U.S.
- Died: May 10, 1994 (aged 87); New Haven, Connecticut, U.S.
- Education: Vanderbilt University (BA); Tulane University (MA); Exeter College, Oxford (BA, BLitt)
- Occupations: Literary critic, academic
- Spouse: Edith Amy Blanchord

Cleanth Brooks (/ˈkliːænθ/ KLEE-anth; October 16, 1906 – May 10, 1994) was an American literary critic and professor. He is best known for his contributions to New Criticism in the mid-20th century and for revolutionizing the teaching of poetry in American higher education. His best-known works, The Well Wrought Urn: Studies in the Structure of Poetry (1947) and Modern Poetry and the Tradition (1939), argue for the centrality of ambiguity and paradox as a way of understanding poetry. With his writing, Brooks helped to formulate formalist criticism, emphasizing "the interior life of a poem" (Leitch 2001) and codifying the principles of close reading.

Brooks was also the preeminent critic of Southern literature, writing classic texts on William Faulkner, and co-founder of the influential journal The Southern Review (Leitch 2001) with Robert Penn Warren.

== Life and career ==
=== Early life ===
On October 16, 1906, in Murray, Kentucky, Brooks was born to a Methodist minister, the Reverend Cleanth Brooks Sr., and Bessie Lee Witherspoon Brooks (Leitch 2001). He was one of three children: Cleanth and William, natural born sons, and Murray Brooks, actually born Hewitt Witherspoon, whom Bessie Lee Witherspoon kidnapped from her brother Forrest Bedford Witherspoon as a young baby after the natural mother had died. She later was able to change his name to Murray Brooks and continued to raise him as her own, causing quite a rift in her own family and alienating herself from Cleanth and William. Cleanth mentioned on more than one occasion that she so doted on Murray (Hewitt) that she no longer had a relationship with Cleanth and William. Attending McTyeire School, a private academy, he received a classical education and went on to study at Vanderbilt University in Nashville, Tennessee, where he received his B.A. summa cum laude in 1928 (Leitch 2001). In 1928, Brooks received his M.A. from Tulane University and went on to study at Exeter College, Oxford, as a Rhodes Scholar. He received his B.A. (first class) in 1931 and his B.Litt. the following year. Brooks then returned to the United States and from 1932 to 1947 was a professor of English at Louisiana State University in Baton Rouge (Singh 1991). In 1934, he married Edith Amy Blanchord.

=== Vanderbilt ===
During his studies at Vanderbilt, he met literary critics and future collaborators Robert Penn Warren, John Crowe Ransom, Andrew Lytle, and Donald Davidson (Singh 1991). Studying with Ransom and Warren, Brooks became involved in two significant literary movements: the Southern Agrarians and the Fugitives (Singh 1991). Brooks admitted to reading the Southern Agrarian manifesto, I'll Take My Stand (1930) "over and over" (qtd. in Leitch 2001). While he never argued for the movement's conservative Southern traditions, he "learned a great deal" (qtd. in Leitch 2001) and found the Agrarian position valuable and "unobjectionable" (qtd. in Leitch 2001): "They asked that we consider what the good life is or ought to be" (qtd. in Leitch 2001).

The Fugitive Movement similarly influenced Brooks' approach to criticism. The Fugitives, a group of Southern poets consisting of such influential writers as John Crowe Ransom, Allen Tate, Donald Davidson, and Robert Penn Warren, met Saturday evenings to read and discuss poetry written by members of the group (Singh 1991). The discussion was based on intensive readings and included considerations of a poem's form, structure, meter, rhyme scheme, and imagery (Singh 1991). This close reading formed the foundation on which the New Critical movement was based and helped shape Brooks' approach to criticism (Singh 1991).

=== Academic life and work ===
While attending the University of Oxford, Brooks continued his friendship with fellow Vanderbilt graduate and Rhodes Scholar, Robert Penn Warren (Leitch 2001). In 1934, Warren joined the English department at Louisiana State, leading Brooks and Warren to collaborate on many works of criticism and pedagogy. In 1935, Brooks and Warren founded The Southern Review. Until 1942, they co-edited the journal, publishing works by many influential authors, including Eudora Welty, Kenneth Burke, and Ford Madox Ford. The journal was known for its criticism and creative writing, marking it as one of the leading journals of the time (Leitch 2001).

In addition, Brooks's and Warren's collaboration led to innovations in the teaching of poetry and literature. At Louisiana State University, prompted by their students' inability to interpret poetry, the two put together a booklet that modeled close reading through examples (Leitch 2001). The booklet was a success and laid the foundation for a number of best-selling textbooks: An Approach to Literature (1936), Understanding Poetry (1938), Understanding Fiction (1943), Modern Rhetoric (1949), and, in collaboration with Robert Heilman, Understanding Drama (1945). Brooks' two most influential works also came out of the success of the booklet: Modern Poetry and the Tradition (1939) and The Well Wrought Urn: Studies in the Structure of Poetry (1947) (Leitch 2001).

From 1941 to 1975, Brooks held many academic positions and received a number of distinguished fellowships and honorary doctorates. In 1941, he worked as a visiting professor at the University of Texas, Austin. From 1947 to 1975, he was an English professor at Yale University, where he held the position of Gray Professor of Rhetoric and Gray Professor of Rhetoric Emeritus from 1960 until his retirement, except 1964 to 1966 (Singh 1991). His tenure at Yale was marked by ongoing research into Southern literature, which resulted in the publication of Brooks' studies of William Faulkner's Yoknapatawpha County (1963, 1978) (Leitch 2001). At Yale, he accepted honorary membership in Manuscript Society. In 1948, he was a fellow of the Kenyon School of English. From 1951 to 1953, he was a fellow of the Library of Congress in Washington, D.C., and was a visiting professor at the University of California, Los Angeles. During this time, he received the Guggenheim Fellowship and held it again in 1960. From 1963 to 1972, he was awarded honorary doctorates of literature from Upsala College, the University of Kentucky, the University of Exeter, Washington and Lee University, Saint Louis University, Tulane University, and Centenary College NJ and Oglethorpe University (Singh 1991).

Brooks' other positions included working as a cultural attaché for the American embassy in London from 1964 to 1966. Further, he held memberships in the American Academy of Arts and Sciences, the National Institute of Arts and Letters, and the American Philosophical Society (Singh 1991).

The National Endowment for the Humanities selected Brooks for the 1985 Jefferson Lecture, the U.S. federal government's highest honor for achievement in the humanities. He delivered the lecture both in Washington and at Tulane University in New Orleans, and it was subsequently included as "Literature in a Technological Age" in a collection of his essays.

== Brooks and New Criticism ==
Brooks was the central figure of New Criticism, a movement that emphasized structural and textual analysis—close reading—over historical or biographical analysis. Brooks advocates close reading because, as he states in The Well Wrought Urn, "by making the closest examination of what the poem says as a poem" (qtd. in Leitch 2001), a critic can effectively interpret and explicate the text. For him, the crux of New Criticism is that literary study be "concerned primarily with the work itself" (qtd. in Leitch 2001). In "The Formalist Critics," Brooks offers "some articles of faith" (qtd. in Leitch 2001) to which he subscribes. These articles exemplify the tenets of New Criticism:

- That the primary concern of criticism is with the problem of unity—the kind of whole which the literary work forms or fails to form, and the relation of the various parts to each other in building up this whole.
- That in a successful work, form and content cannot be separated.
- That form is meaning.
- That literature is ultimately metaphorical and symbolic.
- That the general and the universal are not seized upon by abstraction, but got at through the concrete and the particular.
- That literature is not a surrogate for religion.
- That, as Allen Tate says, "specific moral problems" are the subject matter of literature, but that the purpose of literature is not to point a moral.
- That the principles of criticism define the area relevant to literary criticism; they do not constitute a method for carrying out the criticism (qtd. in Leitch 2001).

New Criticism involves examining a poem's "technical elements, textual patterns, and incongruities" (Leitch 2001) with a kind of scientific rigor and precision. From I. A. Richards' The Principles of Literary Criticism and Practical Criticism, Brooks formulated guidelines for interpreting poetry (Leitch 2001). Brooks formulated these guidelines in reaction to ornamentalist theories of poetry, to the common practice of critics going outside the poem (to historical or biographical contexts), and his and Warren's frustration with trying to teach college students to analyze poetry and literature (Leitch 2001).

Brooks and Warren were teaching using textbooks "full of biographical facts and impressionistic criticism" (Singh 1991). The textbooks failed to show how poetic language differed from the language of an editorial or a work of non-fiction. From this frustration, Brooks and Warren published Understanding Poetry. In the book, the authors assert poetry should be taught as poetry, and the critic should resist reducing a poem to a simple paraphrase, explicating it through biographical or historical contexts, and interpreting it didactically (Singh 1991). For Brooks and Warren, paraphrase and biographical and historical background information is useful as a means of clarifying interpretation, but it should be used as means to an end (Singh 1991).

Brooks took this notion of paraphrase and developed it further in his classic The Well Wrought Urn. The book is a polemic against the tendency for critics to reduce a poem to a single narrative or didactic message. He describes summative, reductionist reading of poetry with a phrase still popular today: "The Heresy of Paraphrase" (Leitch 2001). In fact, he argued poetry serves no didactic purpose because producing some kind of statement would be counter to a poem's purpose. Brooks argues "through irony, paradox, ambiguity and other rhetorical and poetic devices of his or her art, the poet works constantly to resist any reduction of the poem to a paraphrasable core, favoring the presentation of conflicting facets of theme and patterns of resolved stresses" (Leitch 2001).

In addition to arguing against historical, biographical, and didactic readings of a poem, Brooks believed that a poem should not be criticized on the basis of its effect on the reader. In an essay called "The Formalist Critics," he says that "the formalist critic assumes an ideal reader: that is, instead of focusing on the varying spectrum of possible readings, he attempts to find a central point of reference from which he can focus upon the structure of the poem or novel" (qtd. in Rivkin, 24). While he admits that it is problematic to assume such a reference point, he sees it as the only viable option. Since the other options would be either to give any reading equal status with any other reading, or to establish a group of "'qualified' readers" and use those as a range of standard interpretations. In the first case, a correct or "standard" reading would become impossible; in the second case, an ideal reader has still been assumed under the guise of multiple ideal readers (Rivkin 24). Thus, Brooks does not accept the idea of considering critics' emotional responses to works of literature as a legitimate approach to criticism. He says that "a detailed description of my emotional state on reading certain works has little to do with indicating to an interested reader what the work is and how the parts of it are related" (Rivkin 24). For Brooks, nearly everything a critic evaluates must come from within the text itself. This opinion is similar to that expressed by W. K. Wimsatt and Monroe C. Beardsley in their famous essay "The Affective Fallacy," in which they argue that a critic is "a teacher or explicator of meanings," not a reporter of "physiological experience" in the reader (qtd. in Adams, 1029, 1027).

== Reaction to New Criticism ==
Because New Criticism isolated the text and excluded historical and biographical contexts, critics argued as early as 1942 that Brooks' approach to criticism was flawed for being overly narrow and for "disabl[ing] any and all attempts to relate literary study to political, social, and cultural issues and debates" (1350). His reputation suffered in the 1970s and 1980s when criticism of New Criticism increased. Brooks rebuffed the accusations that New Criticism has an "antihistorical thrust" (Leitch 2001) and a "neglect of context" (Leitch 2001). He insisted he was not excluding context because a poem possesses organic unity, and it is possible to derive a historical and biographical context from the language the poet uses (Singh 1991). He argues "A poem by Donne or Marvell does not depend for its success on outside knowledge that we bring to it; it is richly ambiguous yet harmoniously orchestrated, coherent in its own special aesthetic terms" (Leitch 2001).

New Criticism was accused by critics of having a contradictory nature. Brooks writes, on the one hand, "the resistance which any good poem sets up against all attempts to paraphrase it" (qtd. in Leitch 2001) is the result of the poet manipulating and warping language to create new meaning. On the other hand, he admonishes the unity and harmony in a poem's aesthetics. These seemingly contradictory forces in a poem create tension and paradoxical irony according to Brooks, but critics questioned whether irony leads to a poem's unity or undermines it (Leitch 2001). Poststructuralists in particular saw a poem's resistance and warped language as competing with its harmony and balance that Brooks celebrates (Leitch 2001).

Ronald Crane was particularly hostile to the views of Brooks and the other New Critics. In "The Critical Monism of Cleanth Brooks," Crane writes that under Brooks's view of a poem's unity being achieved through the irony and paradox of the opposing forces it contains, the world's most perfect example of such an ironic poem would be Albert Einstein's equation E=mc^{2}, which equates matter and energy at a constant rate (Searle).

In his later years, Brooks criticized the poststructuralists for inviting subjectivity and relativism into their analysis, asserting "each critic played with the text's language unmindful of aesthetic relevance and formal design" (Leitch 2001). This approach to criticism, Brooks argued, "denied the authority of the work" (Leitch 2001).

== Influence ==
Understanding Poetry was an unparalleled success and remains "a classic manual for the intellectual and imaginative skills required for the understanding of poetry" (Singh 1991). Further, critics praise Brooks and Warren for "introducing New Criticism with commendable clarity" (Singh 1991) and for teaching students how to read and interpret poetry. Arthur Mizener commended Brooks and Warren for offering a new way of teaching poetry:

For us the real revolution in critical theory...was heralded by the publication, in 1938, of Understanding Poetry...for many of us who were preparing ourselves to teach English in those years....this book...came as a kind of revelation. It made sense because it opened up for us a way of talking about an actual poem in an actual classroom, and because the technique of focusing upon a poem as language rather than as history or biography or morality, gave a whole new meaning to and justification for the teaching of poetry (qtd. in Singh 1991).

In an obituary for Brooks, John W. Stevenson of Converse College notes Brooks "redirect[ed] and revolutionize[d] the teaching of literature in American colleges and universities" (1994). Further, Stevenson admits Brooks was "the person who brought excitement and passion to the study of literature" (1994) and "whose work...became the model for a whole profession" (1994).

Along with New Criticism, Brooks' studies of Faulkner, Southern literature, and T. S. Eliot's The Waste Land (appearing in Modern Poetry and the Tradition) remain classic texts. Mark Royden Winchell calls Brooks' text on Faulkner "the best book yet on the works of William Faulkner" (1996). Eliot himself commended Brooks in a letter for Brooks' critique of "The Waste Land" (Singh 1991). Further, Winchell praises Brooks for "help[ing] invent the modern literary quarterly" (1996) through the success of The Southern Review.

As testament to Brooks' influence, fellow critic and former teacher John Crowe Ransom calls Brooks "the most forceful and influential critic of poetry that we have" (qtd. in Singh 1991). Elsewhere, Ransom has even gone so far as to describe Brooks as a "spell binder" (qtd. in Singh 1991).

== Books by Brooks ==
=== Monographs ===
- 1935. The Relation of the Alabama-Georgia Dialect to the Provincial Dialects of Great Britain
- 1936. An Approach to Literature
- 1938. Understanding Poetry
- 1939. Modern Poetry and the Tradition
- 1943. Understanding Fiction
- 1947. The Well Wrought Urn: Studies in the Structure of Poetry
- 1957. Literary Criticism: A Short History
- 1963. William Faulkner: The Yoknapatawpha Country
- 1973. American Literature: The Makers and the Making
- 1978. William Faulkner: Toward Yoknapatawpha and Beyond
- 1983. William Faulkner: First Encounters
- 1985. The Language of the American South

=== Essay collections ===
- 1964. The Hidden God: Studies in Hemingway, Faulkner, Yeats, Eliot, and Warren
- 1971. A Shaping Joy: Studies in the Writer's Craft
- 1991. Historical Evidence and the Reading of Seventeenth-Century Poetry
- 1995. Community, Religion, and Literature: Essays
