= Women in the French Resistance =

Women's role and participation in the French Resistance

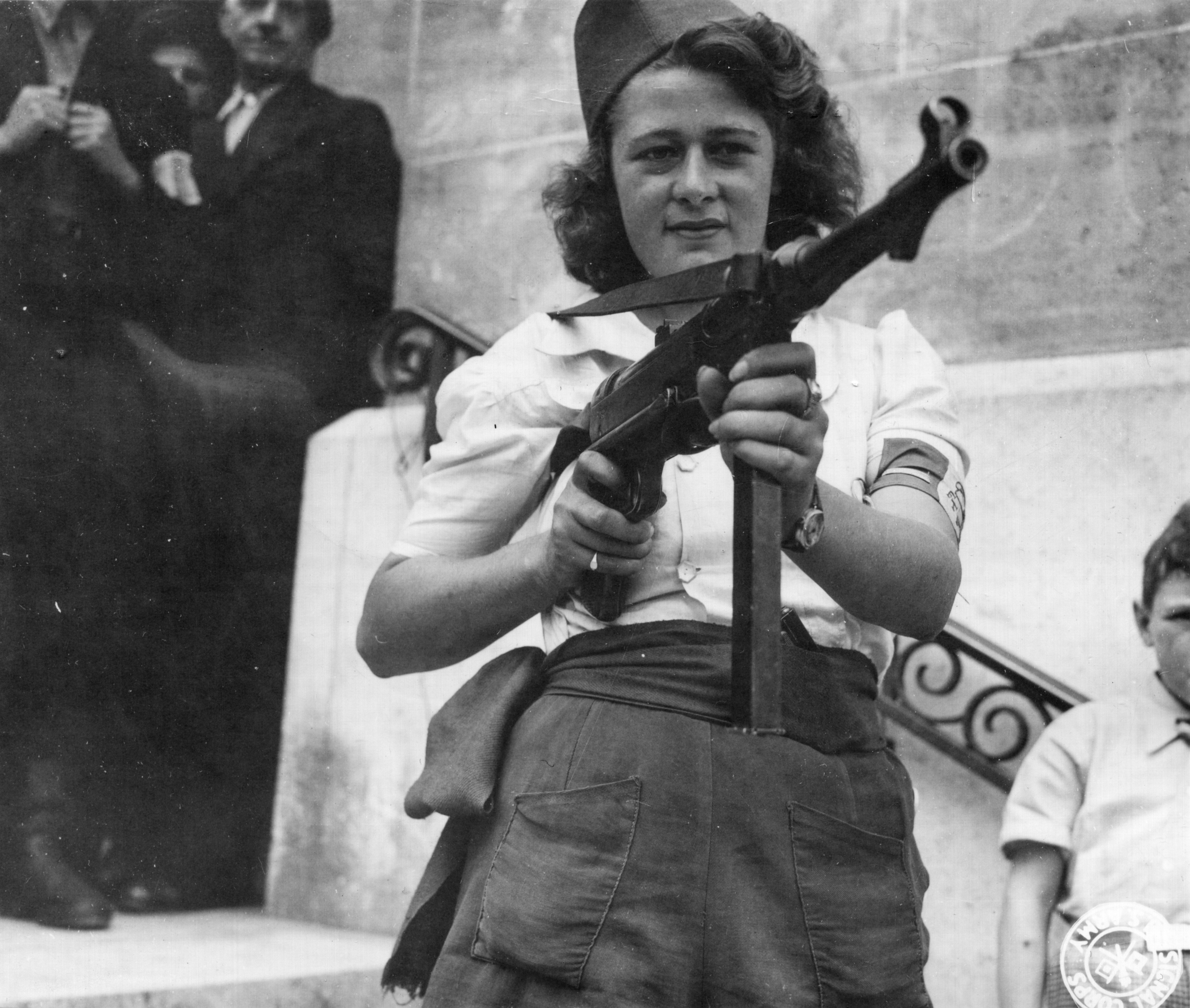
Simone Segouin, a female combatant of the French Resistance in Chartres on August 23, 1944.

Women in the French Resistance played an important role in the context of resistance against occupying German forces during World War II. Women represented 15 to 20% of the total number of French Resistance fighters within the country. Women also represented 15% of political deportations to Nazi concentration camps.

== Actions in the French Resistance ==
Women were generally confined to underground roles in the French Resistance network. Lucie Aubrac, who has become a symbol of the French Resistance within France, never had a clearly defined role in the hierarchy of the movement, which in her case involved the regional Southern Liberation. Hélène Viannay, more highly educated than her husband Philippe Viannay, the founder of the Défense de la France, did not write one single article for the clandestine newspaper of the same name, nor did the other companions of the chiefs of the Défense de la France, although they did take part in meetings to edit the newspaper. On the other hand, Suzanne Buisson, cofounder of the Comité d'action socialiste (CAS) was the treasurer until her arrest. Only one woman, Marie-Madeleine Fourcade, was a head of a network (by leading the British to believe that the true head of the Alliance network was actually a man). No woman ever led a movement, or a maquis (guerilla group) or a Liberation Committee, none was installed as a Commissioner within the Provisional Government of the Republic of France or a Minister of the Liberation.

Women fought in the armed battles. Although women were typical partisan anti-German resistance fighters in Italy, Spain, Greece, Yugoslavia and the German-occupied Soviet Union, feared and numerous, they were a minority in the maquis in France. It has been speculated that this may have been influenced by the fact that French women were not subject to the Service du travail obligatoire (English: Compulsory Work Service; STO), as were women in many other German-occupied countries.

Women organized demonstrations of housewives in 1940, were active in the comités populaires of the clandestine PCF, and ever present with encouragement and material aid for strikers, as in the Nord-Pas-de-Calais in May 1941, as well as supporting the maquis. They were indispensable as typists, and above all as liaison agents—in part because the Germans distrusted women less, and also because the numerous identification controls against resistors of the Service du travail obligatoire (STO) did not apply to them. Historian Olivier Wieviorka emphasizes that the strategy of these movements was often, in fact to put women into missions that required visibility, since they were less exposed to repression: the Vichy government of occupied France and the German military were not able to fire on French women demanding food for their children.

Madeleine Riffaud, a student midwife who volunteered with the Communist Party-aligned Francs-tireurs et partisans (FTP), recalled being "cross at being told always to carry weapons across town for the men to use". She secured permission to use a gun herself, and on 23 July 1944, in broad daylight on a bridge overlooking the river Seine, shot a lone German NCO. After being arrested, and tortured unsuccessfully for her contacts, she was released in a prisoner exchange and she returned immediately to the struggle. On 23 August, Riffaud commanded an FTP that trapped a train carrying loot and munitions in the Buttes-Chaumont tunnel and secured the surrender of the 80 German soldiers aboard. On the 25th, she also took part in an attack on the barracks on Place de la République. Yet after the Liberation of Paris, being a woman, Riffaud was unable to finish the war with the rest of her resistance group, now part of the regular French army. At a time when women in France did not yet have the right to vote, she was told that she did not have her father's permission.

== Individual sacrifices ==
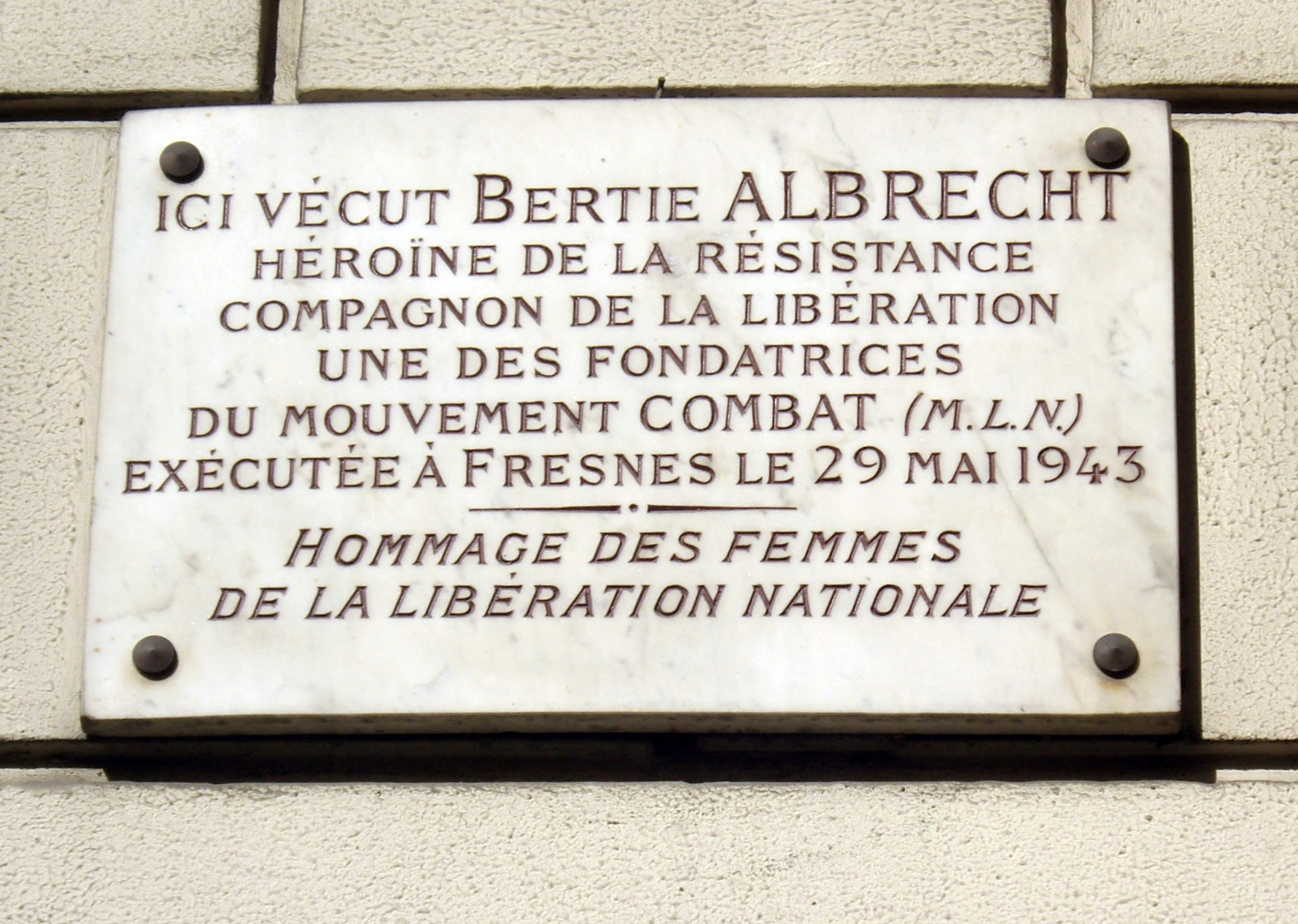
A plaque on a house in Paris, commemorating Berty Albrecht, who helped found the Mouvement Combat (MLN), and who died at Fresnes on May 29, 1943.

Some of the most prominent women in the French Resistance were Marie-Hélène Lefaucheux who was chief of the women's section of the Organisation civile et militaire. She was also a member of the Paris Liberation Committee. Following the French Liberation, she was a Deputy and then Senator of the French government. Touty Hiltermann played a decisive role in the establishment and functioning of the Dutch-Paris movement. Germaine Tillion became head of the Hauet-Vildé Resistance network from 1941 to 1942, later approved by the larger Resistance network Groupe du musée de l'Homme. Hélène Studler organized réseau d'évasions, networks for smuggling dissidents out of France. Thousands of prisoners and Resistance members escaped to freedom through her work. She organized the escape of François Mitterrand, the future President of France; Boris Holban, founder of the network FTP-MOI in March 1942; and General Henri Giraud on April 17, 1942.

Some clandestine combatants survived the war as part of a couple, and that their Resistance participation would have been impossible or unsurvivable without the support of their companion at their side: Cécile and Henri Rol-Tanguy, Raymond and Lucie Aubrac, Paulette and Maurice Kriegel-Valrimont, Hélène and Philippe Viannay, Marie-Hélène and Pierre Lefaucheux, Cletta and Daniel Mayer, and many others were inseparable.

There were numerous women in the Resistance who married and had children entirely clandestinely, without interrupting their Resistance struggle. Some saved the lives of their husbands, such as Lucie Aubrac or Marie-Hélène Lefaucheux. Others shared their struggle up to torture, deportation and death, such as Madeleine Truel. A famous deportation convoy, on January 24, 1943, included many communists and widows of men shot by the occupation regime, including Maï Politzer, wife of Georges Politzer, or Hélène Solomon, daughter of the great scholar Paul Langevin and wife of writer Jacques Solomon.

== Legacy ==
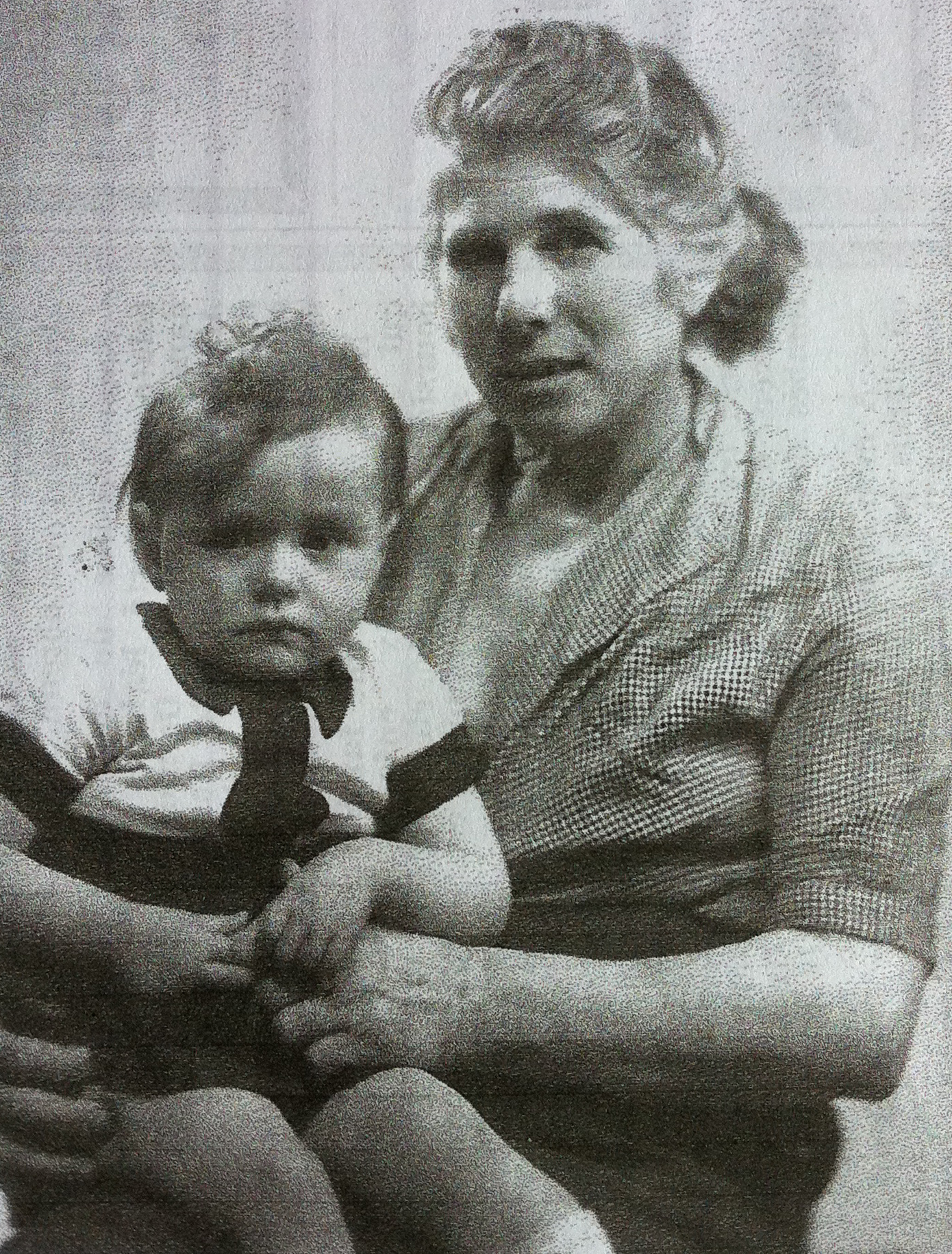
Delphine Aigle, French Resistance member in Romilly-sur-Seine, honoured with a plaque on her home after the end of the War.

While the CNR neglected to mention giving the vote to women in its programme of renewal in March 1944, Charles de Gaulle signed the order declaring women's suffrage for French citizens in Algiers, on April 2, 1944. The emancipating role of the women in the French Resistance was thus recognized.

There are few monuments honouring the actions of these women. One of the exceptions is the city of Riom, which has honoured two of its citizens with a specific monument: Marinette Menut, Lieutenant-Pharmacist of the MURs d'Auverne and Claude Rodier-Virlogeux, Master Sergeant of the MURs d'Auvergne.

== Popular culture ==
- In the immediate post-war years, Madeleine Ruffaud drew on her experience with the Resistance for stories published in the young-readers (Jeunesse héroïque) series of the PCF-aligned Éditions France d’abord: La belle vengeance de Bleuette (‘Bleuette’s vengeance’, 1945) and On s’est battu contre la mort (‘We fought against death’, 1946).
- Charlotte Delbo, a Resistance member and survivor of Auschwitz, wrote a number of works based on her experiences, including the trilogy published as Auschwitz, et après (1965)--in English, Auschwitz and After (1995).
- The novel Villa Normandie by Kevin Doherty (Endeavour Press, 2015) features a female Resistance cell leader as the main character.
- A Train in Winter by Caroline Moorehead (Vintage, 2012) tells the story of women who were captured and sent on the only train to take women of the Resistance to the Nazi death camps. Moorehead was able to talk with some of their families decades later. The journey of these women became known as Le Convoi des 31000.

== Bibliography ==
=== Memoirs by Women in the French Resistance ===
- Charlotte Delbo, Convoy to Auschwitz: Women of the French Resistance, Northeastern (May 22, 1997), ISBN 978-1-55553-313-7
- Charlotte Delbo, Auschwitz and After, Yale University Press (1995), ISBN 978-0-300-07057-6
- Claire Chevrillon, Code Name Christiane Clouet, TAMU Press; 1st edition (April 1, 1995), ISBN 978-0-89096-629-7
- Virginia d'Albert-Lake, An American Heroine in the French Resistance: The Diary and Memoir of Virginia d'Albert-Lake, Fordham University Press; 3rd edition (March 14, 2008), ISBN 978-0-8232-2582-8
- Marthe Cohn, Behind Enemy Lines: The True Story of a French Jewish Spy in Nazi Germany, Three Rivers Press (March 28, 2006), ISBN 978-0-307-33590-6
- Lucie Aubrac, Outwitting the Gestapo, University of Nebraska Press (November 1, 1994), ISBN 978-0-8032-5923-2
- Madeleine Riffaud, On l'appelait Rainer : 1939–1945 (1994), ISBN 978-2-260-01162-0
- Agnès Humbert, Résistance: A Frenchwoman's Journal of the War, Bloomsbury USA; 1st edition (September 2, 2008), ISBN 1-59691-559-5
- Andrée Peel (née Virot) autobiography, Miracles Existent!, translated by Evelyn Scott Brown and published in English as Miracles Do Happen, Loebertas; 1st Edition (Nov. 1999), ISBN 978-1874316374
- Ilian Stuart, Provenance, (June 21, 2004), ISBN 978-1412022163, 1412022169

=== History ===
- Margaret Collins Weitz, Sisters In the Resistance: How Women Fought to Free France, 1940-1945, Wiley; 1st edition (November 3, 1995), ISBN 978-0-471-12676-8
