= Art world =

Those involved in the business and lifestyle of fine art

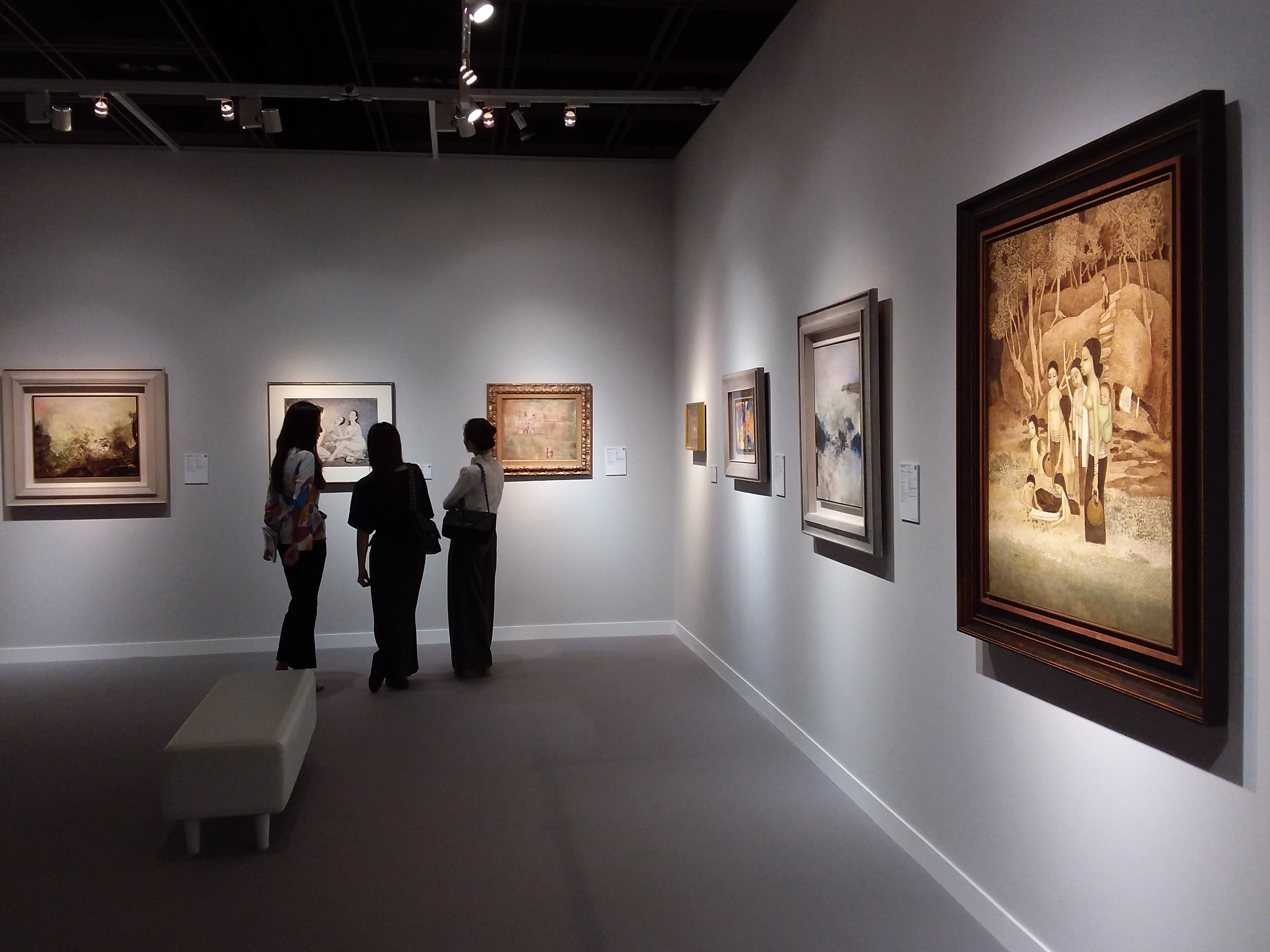
Preview of works for auction by Christie's Hong Kong, May 2019

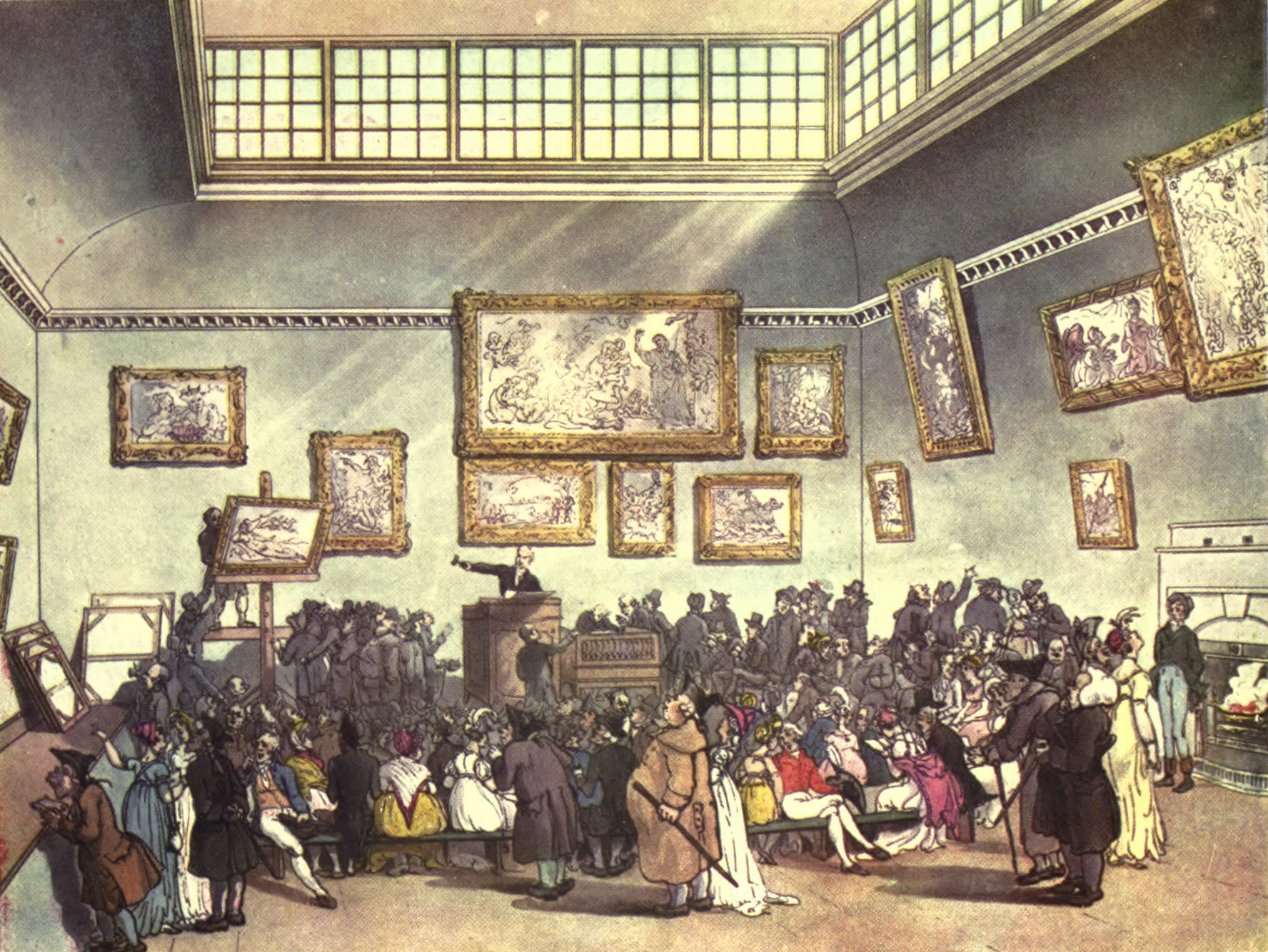
The Microcosm of London (1808), an engraving of Christie's auction room

The art world comprises everyone involved in producing, commissioning, presenting, preserving, promoting, chronicling, criticizing, buying, and selling fine art. There are many art worlds, defined either by location or alternative definitions of fine art, and they are continually changing in response both to social change and the creativity of those that create art. Some may use the singular art world to refer only to the elite level of globalized fine art.

== History ==
Rather than being a term coined in the 20th century, the art world can be found in publications from the 19th century. The emergence of many of the elements, such as galleries, critics, and museums, as well as the term fine arts (Beaux Arts) dates from the 18th century.

== Sociological definition ==
An art world, as with any segment of society, is defined in terms of mutually understood conventions (social norms, roles, and institutions) that are the basis for cooperative activity between members of a group who may not interact directly.

Howard S. Becker describes an art world as "the network of people whose cooperative activity, organized via their joint knowledge of conventional means of doing things, produces the kind of artworks that the art world is noted for." Becker admits this definition is tautological, but it is useful in understanding how works of art are produced and consumed.

Sarah Thornton, also a sociologist, describes the art world as "a loose network of overlapping subcultures held together by a belief in art". They span the globe but cluster in art capitals such as New York City, London, Los Angeles, and Berlin.

== Roles in the art world ==
=== Production ===
There are a number of roles for those actively involved in the creation of new works of fine art, but the exemplar remains the lone artist or a close collaboration. Historically, art was produced by the members of a workshop, often a master and a number of journeymen and apprentices. Contemporary artists allude to this group practice in their establishment of studio workshops or "factories", or by having works fabricated by industrial methods according to their plans and specifications. Some works, being of monumental scale, cannot be executed in any other way. In most of these group practices, the authenticity associated with fine art is maintained by the artist either doing the essential work, closely supervising others, and giving final approval to the finished piece by signing it.

Artwork by women was largely excluded from the highest levels of the art world until the feminist movement of the 1970s.

The primary socialization of individuals into the role of artists is by attendance at art school. The value of contemporary art depends upon the reputation of the artist, which most often begins with earning an MFA from a select number of art school programs. Some self-taught or outsider artists may gain recognition by being discovered by a dealer, while others are denied inclusion.

=== Distribution ===
The economic sustainability of artistic production depends in part on systems of distribution, such as patronage, gallery representation, commissions, and direct sales. Contemporary art is most often distributed through intermediaries.

An art dealer is the intermediary between artists, private collectors and institutional buyers. While some dealers may be consultant advising individual clients, dealers usually own or operate art galleries. Hosting public exhibitions and opening celebrations became part of the social function of the art world in addition to their marketing functions.

The international art fair, occurring typically every two years, has become a major force in the marketing of contemporary fine art. Commercial art fairs are essentially temporary galleries that benefit from the attraction of public interest and competition between collectors. One of the most successful, Art Basel originated in Switzerland in the 1970s, expanded to Miami in 2000 and Hong Kong in 2010. Art Basel built on the model of Art Cologne, the first fair sponsored by and for commercial galleries; in contrast to the government sponsored world's fairs that began in the Victorian era. One of the latter, the Venice Biennale founded in 1895, continues to operate as a public foundation with national pavilions.

The tradition of auctioning works of art grew from the difficulty of determining the price of rare and unique objects. While estimates of market value are made for other purposes, such as taxation, charitable donations, and estates; in recent years prices paid at auctions have exceeded such estimates.

=== Evaluation ===
==== Art critics ====
In 1964, critic and philosopher Arthur Danto published an essay defining "The Artworld," in terms of artistic theory. Danto writes: "these days one might not be aware he was on artistic terrain without an artistic theory to tell him so. And part of the reason for this lies in the fact that terrain is constituted artistic in virtue of artistic theories, so that one use of theories, in addition to helping us discriminate art from the rest, consists in making art possible". In "The Painted Word" Tom Wolfe went further in saying that without a theory, the viewer cannot see a modern work of art. Theory is needed due to the absence of narrative meaning in abstract art that was once provided by realistic art. At the beginning of the 21st century, Danto stated that contemporary art does not speak for itself, but has meaning only in reference to art-world discourse.

Becker, however, notes that new theories of art may arise in order to account for the acceptance by the art world of works not fitting into older theories. An example is the failure of imitation theories, in which art was judged solely by it faithful representation of nature, to account for works which used form and color to express emotions, giving rise to formalism.

Danto had considerable influence on aesthetic philosophy and especially upon George Dickie's institutional theory of art. Dickie defines an art work as an artifact "which has had conferred upon it the status of candidate for appreciation by some person or persons acting in behalf of a certain social institution (the artworld)."

== Change ==
The notion of the singular art world is problematic, since Becker and others show art worlds are, instead, independent multiplicities scattered worldwide that are always in flux: there is no "center" to the art world anymore.

The art world, along with the definition of fine art, is constantly changing as works of art previously excluded move into the "avant garde" and then into mainstream culture.
