= Viannay =

Viannay is a surname. Notable people with the surname include:

- Hélène Viannay (1917–2006), French résistante
- Philippe Viannay (1917–1986), French journalist.
