= Weitz =

Weitz is a German surname. Notable people with the surname include:

- Brian Weitz (born 1979), American musician
- Bruce Weitz (born 1943), American actor
- Chris Weitz (born 1969), Academy Award nominated producer, writer and director
- David A. Weitz (born 1951), American physicist
- Eduard Weitz (born 1946), Israeli Olympic weightlifter
- Jeffrey Weitz, contemporary Canadian biochemist
- John Weitz, (1923–2002), American fashion designer, historian and novelist
- Julie Weitz (born 1979), American virtual artist
- Kristine Weitz (born 1962), American singer and songwriter
- Margaret Weitz (born 1929), American cultural scientist
- Mark Weitz (born 1945), keyboard player
- Morris Weitz (1916-1981), American aesthetician
- Paul J. Weitz (1932–2017), American astronaut
- Paul Weitz (filmmaker) (born 1965), American filmmaker
- Perry Weitz, contemporary American lawyer
- Yechiam Weitz (born 1951), Israeli historian
- Yosef Weitz (1890–1972), director of the Land and Afforestation Department of the Jewish National Fund

== See also ==
- The Weitz Company, American engineering firm
- Waitz
- Weiz
- Whites
