= Hélène Viannay =

French resistance member (1917–2006)

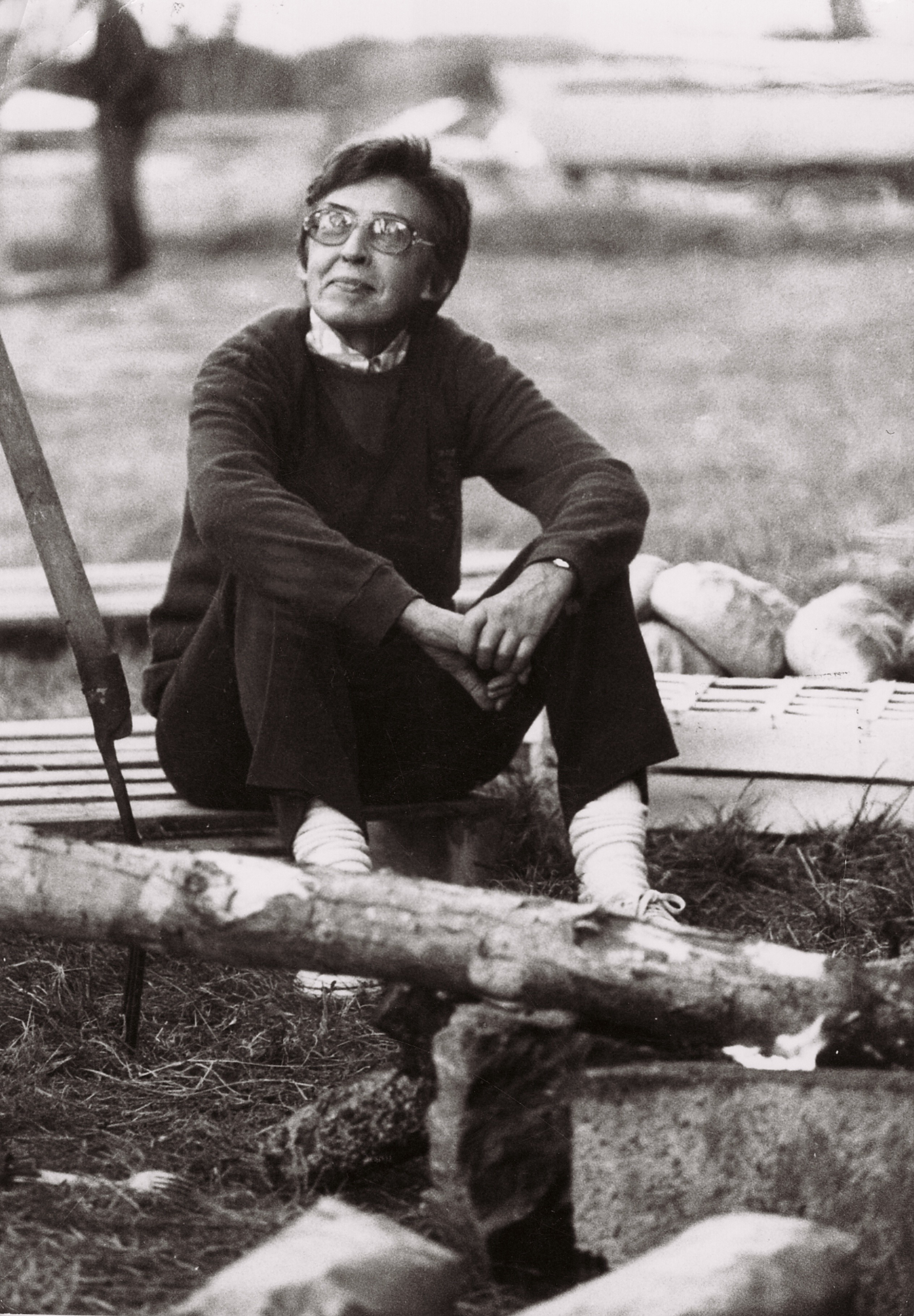
- Viannay in an unknown date
- Born: Hélène Mordkovitch; 12 July 1917
- Died: 25 December 2006 (aged 89)
- Known for: French Resistance
- Notable work: La Défense de la France
- Spouse: Philippe Viannay

Hélène Victoria Mordkovitch (12 July 1917 in Paris – 25 December 2006), spouse of Philippe Viannay, was a French résistance who cofounded the Resistance movement Défense de la France on 14 July 1941.

== Biography ==
Hélène Viannay was born in Paris to Russian parents, who had emigrated to Paris in 1908 after being twice imprisoned by the Czarist government. Her mother, Marie Kopiloff, who had given free medical care to workers in Russia, began medical studies at the Sorbonne, which were interrupted by the First World War. She joined the Red Cross and her husband, Israël, fought with French forces. Soon after the war, he returned to support the Russian Revolution. Hélène would never know him. She succeeded brilliantly at public school. To a professor who scolded students for falling behind her — a Russian girl — she responded, "But I am French, Monsieur!."

In fact, as she wrote later, her "will to French identification" caused her to distance herself from her family's Russian culture. She continued her studies at the Sorbonne as a geography student, despite the death of her mother on 15 November 1937. Hélène Mordkovitch was supported by her professor Léon Lutaud, who located an endowment for her and asked her to become his assistant in the laboratory of Physical Geography and Dynamic Geology, which was practically deserted after the exodus at the onset of occupation in the summer of 1940. It was there she met, at the beginning of the school year in September, Philippe Viannay, a philosophy student seeking a certificate in geography.

== Défense de la France ==
Both résistants since the Armistice, they decided not to escape to London, but to oppose Germany from within their Parisian university milieu by writing an underground newspaper in the mold of La libre Belgique, published in occupied Belgium during the First World War. On 14 July 1941 the first official issue of Défense de la France was published by Viannay, her husband, fellow student Robert Salmon, and the financial support of friend and escaped prisoner Marcel Lebon who financed the purchase of a Rotaprint, a Czech offset printing machine. The newspaper was printed at the residence of an acquaintance's mother, Saint-Jacques, then at Philippe's parents home, and finally in the immense basement of the Sorbonne until 1942. Later in life, Viannay would learn that the first printing press in France was brought here by Guillaume Fichet, himself an ancestor of a fellow résistant, Octave Simon. In fact, as a volunteer on-site firefighter in the Sorbonne Geology laboratory since 1939, Hélène possessed keys to the university's entrance on rue Cujas. The motto of the journal is a quotation from Pascal: "I only believe stories told by those witnesses who are willing to have their throats cut.". It would be in production until the Liberation, its circulation having reached 450,000 copies in January 1944. Philippe and Hélène married in 1942. Their first child, Pierre, was born in hiding the following year, while they were under pursuit. Philippe could not be present at the birth. Until the end of the war, Hélène Viannay organized the circulation of the paper and the mass production of False Papers for those resisting forced labor.

== The Maquis of Ronquerolles ==
In 1944, she joined the Maquis of Ronquerolles (Seine-et-Oise Nord), directed by her husband, and thereby assured the communication between different sectors and between the maquis and Paris. After her husband was injured, she maintained the coordination of different sectors on her own. In an example of the continuance of the traditional subordination of women, even within the Resistance, Hélène Viannay, despite possessing higher credentials than her husband, never dreamed of writing an article for the publication, although she and the other directors' spouses attended all the writing meetings. Later on, she loved to bring up the fact that, despite her service to the resistance, she, like all other French women, had to wait until the 1960s to be permitted to use a checkbook or buy a piece of furniture without the approval of her husband...

== Center for the Training of Journalists ==
Just after the war, the Viannays started the Center for the Training of Journalists (Centre de Formation des Journalistes) in Paris, whose operations continue to this day. Many well-known journalists and personalities, from Patrick Poivre d'Arvor to Pierre Lescure and Bernard Pivot.

== The Nautical Center of the Glénans ==
In 1947, they also founded the Nautical Center of the Glénans (Le Centre nautique des Glénans), which initially served to convalesce many deportees and battle-weary résistants. Hélène assumed the function of general representative and managed the association from 1954 until retirement in 1979.

- In 1991, she participated in the creation of the prix Philippe Viannay-Défense de la France. This prize rewards annually one or two works on the resistance to Nazism in France or elsewhere in Europe.
- After a ceremony at Père Lachaise Cemetery on 4 January 2007 her ashes were dispersed the following summer at the northern tip of the Glénan Islands.

== Awards ==
- She was honored with the Croix de Guerre
- Resistance Medal with rosette.
- In the year 2001, with Anneliese Knoop-Graf she received the Adenauer-de Gaulle Prize, a recognition of efforts at Franco-German reconciliation.
- In 2001, Hélène Viannay was promoted to commander of the Legion of Honour.

== See also ==
- Défense de la France
- Underground Press
- Women in World War II
- Les Glénans

== Bibliography ==
- Wieviorka, Olivier (1995), Une certaine idée de la Résistance - Le mouvement Défense de la France, Éditions Gallimard
- Feletin, Clarisse (2005), Hélène Viannay. L'instinct de résistance de l'Occupation à l'école des Glénans, Éditions Pascal
- Christiane Goldenstedt: Hélène Viannay (1917-2006). Mitgründerin der Segelschule Les Glénans für Deportierte und Résistants, in: Florence Hervé (Hrsg.), Mit Mut und List. Europäische Frauen im Widerstand gegen Faschismus und Krieg, Köln 2020, PapyRossa, ISBN 978-3-89438-724-2.
