= Tiziana Andina =

Theoretical philosophy professor

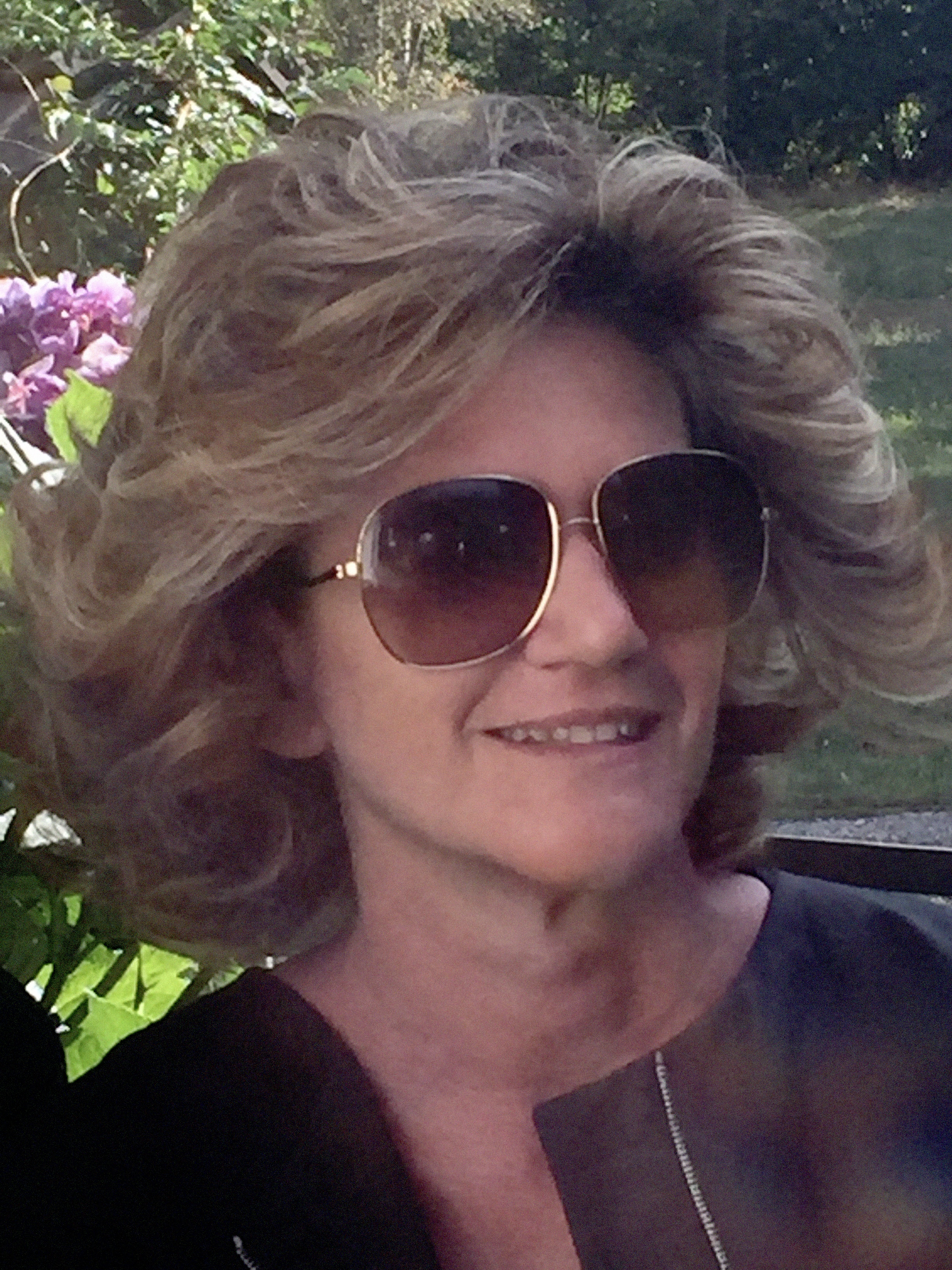
- Born: 10 February 1970 (age 56); Asti
- Employer: University of Turin

Tiziana Andina (born 10 February 1970) is full professor of theoretical philosophy at the University of Turin.

== Biography ==
Tiziana Andina was born in Asti in 1970. Andina attended the University of Turin where she studied philosophy graduating in 1994. She got her PhD in aesthetics and theory of art in 2003 from the University of Palermo. She went on to become researcher and professor at the University of Turin, where she teaches theoretical philosophy. Her recent research interests concern aesthetics and philosophy of art, social ontology, trans-generational action, the relationship between generations and problems of inter-generational justice. She is co-editor of the international series "Analytic Aesthetics and Contemporary Art (Bloomsbury) and Brill Researches Perspectives in Art and Law". Since 2020, Andina has been the managing editor of Rivista di Estetica, one of Italy's oldest journals. In 2016 she became director of the Labont research center.

== Books ==
- Arthur Danto: Philosopher of Pop, Cambridge Scholars Publishing 2011;
- The Philosophy of Art: The Question of Definition. From Hegel to Post-Dantian Theories, Bloomsbury Academy 2013;
- An Ontology for Social Reality, London, Palgrave-Macmillan, 2016;
- What is Art? The Question of Definition Reloaded, Brill, 2017;
- A Philosophy for Future Generations. The Structure and Dynamics of Transgenerationality, Bloomsbury Academic, 2022.

== Books in Italian ==
- Transgenerazionalità. Una filosofia per le generazioni future, Roma, Carocci, 2020.
- Filosofia dell’arte. Da Hegel a Danto. Nuova edizione, Roma, Carocci, 2019.
- Ontologia sociale. Transgenerazionalità, potere, giustizia, Roma, Carocci, 2016.
- Filosofie dell’arte. Da Hegel a Danto, Roma, Ca-rocci 2012; reprinted in 2021.
- Arthur Danto: un filosofo pop, Roma, Carocci, 2010.
- Confini sfumati. I problemi dell’arte, le soluzioni della percezione, Milano, Mimesis, 2009.
- Il problema della percezione nella filosofia di Nietzsche, Milano, AlboVersorio, 2005.
- Percezione e rappresentazione. Alcune ipotesi tra Gombrich e Arnheim, Palermo, Aesthetica Preprint, 2005.
- Il volto americano di Nietzsche, Napoli, La Città del Sole, 1999.

== Edited volumes ==
- (with Fausto Corvino), Transgenerationality, community and justice, The Monist, 1/ 2023.
- (with F. Corvino), Climate Change and Global distributive Justice, E-International Relations, 2023: Open access: https://www.e-ir.info/publication/global-climate-justice-theory-and-practice/
- (with Xiao Ouyang), Rethinking Through Art: East and West, Rivista di Estetica, Anno LXII, N. 80/2022.
- (with Petar Bojanic), Institutions in Actions. The Nature and Rule of the Institutions in the Real World, Springer Nature, 2020.
- (with Angela Condello), Post-Truth. Philosophy and Law, London-New York, Routledge, 2019.
  - The Turkish edition is in preparation.
- (with Erica Onnis), The Philosophy and Art of Wang Guangyi, London-New-York, Bloomsbury Academic, 2019.
- (with Carola Barbero and Carolyn Korsmeyer), Food, «The Monist», 2018, Volume 101, Isue 3, pp. 235–361
