= Friendship Medal =

Friendship Medal may refer to:

- Friendship Medal (China)
- Friendship Medal (Cuba)
- Friendship Medal (Vietnam)
