= Atomus =

Cypriot magician (1st century)

Atomus (Greek: Άτομος) was a Cypriot magician who appears in the Antiquities of the Jews (c. 94 CE) of Josephus. Atomus is presented as a functionary of the Roman procurator of Judaea province, Antonius Felix (r. 52-60 CE), in Caesarea Maritima.

Atomus was Jewish and is described as having been employed by Felix to persuade Herod Agrippa II's sister Drusilla to divorce her husband Azizus of Emesa so that he (Felix) could marry her.

In some Latin manuscripts of the Antiquities, the character is called "Simon" rather than Atomus. Based on this naming convention, the Biblical scholar Hans Waitz suggested in 1904 that the "magician" Atomus may be identifiable with Simon Magus, a character who appears in the Acts of the Apostles of the Christian New Testament. (Acts is typically dated to 80-90 CE.) Waitz's identification of Atomus with Simon Magus is not generally accepted, as Atomus was a Jew and Simon Magus a Samaritan.
