= Waitz =

Waitz is a surname. Notable people with the surname include:

- Hans Waitz, German Biblical scholar
- Georg Waitz, German historian and politician
- Grete Waitz, Norwegian long distance runner
- Theodor Waitz, German psychologist and anthropologist

== See also ==
- Weitz
- Weiz, a town and district in Austria
