= Margaret Weitz =

American academic (1929–2025)

Margaret Collins Weitz
- Born: May 24, 1929
- Died: May 23, 2025 (aged 95)
- Awards: Prix Litteraire de la Resistance; Ordre des Palmes Académiques; Ordre national du Mérite

Academic background
- Education: Harvard University; University of Poitiers; Ohio State University

Academic work
- Discipline: Romance Languages and Literature
- Institutions: Suffolk University; Harvard University; Ohio State University
- Main interests: Women in the French Resistance
- Notable works: Sisters in the Resistance: How Women Fought to Free France 1940-1945; Combattantes de l’ombre: Histoire des femmes dans la Résistance 1940-1945

Margaret Collins Weitz (/ˈwiːts/; May 24, 1929 – May 23, 2025) was an American academic who was a professor emeritus at Suffolk University. Collins Weitz was the author of books and many articles on French culture, French women, and the role of women in the French Resistance.

Collins Weitz graduated from St. Ursula Academy in Toledo, Ohio, and went on to obtain her bachelor's degree from Ohio State University in humanities in 1953. She was awarded a Fulbright grant and proceeded to study for the next two years at University of Poitiers. After studying at Poitiers, she became the first Fulbright scholar to lecture at University of Aix-Marseilles. She later returned to the United States and earned her M.A. from Ohio State University in Romance Languages and Literature. She taught at OSU's Department of Comparative Literature between 1961 and 1969. While at OSU, she met her husband, Morris Weitz. The couple moved to Boston, where she enrolled in Harvard, eventually earning a Ph.D in Comparative Literature in 1975. She spent five years teaching at Harvard University in a number of departments. In 1984, she joined Suffolk University to Chair their newly-created Department of Humanities and Modern Languages, where she remained for eighteen years.

Her primary research interests dealt with French topics and women. Her most notable publication is Sisters in the Resistance: How Women Fought to Free France 1940-1945, which was published in 1996 (and inspired a 2006 play by the same name). The French translation Combattantes de l’ombre: Histoire des femmes dans la Résistance was published in 1997. For that historical work she received decorations from the French government, including the grade of Officer of the Ordre des Palmes Académiques and the Chevalier grade of the Ordre national du Mérite in 2003.

Collins Weitz had three children. Weitz died on May 23, 2025, at the age of 95.
