= International Sailing Schools Association =

Non-profit international association

- Abbreviation: ISSA
- Formation: 1969; 57 years ago
- Founder: Les Glénans – France; Polish Yachting Association – Poland; Yacht Club de Morges – Switzerland; Casa di Vela Caprera – Italy; National School Sailing Association – UK; Centro Internacional de Navigacion de Arousa – Spain
- Founded at: Paris and London
- Purpose: ISSA aims to provide opportunities worldwide for people who dream of learning to sail to make a start in a sailing school. Also, ISSA provides an international career path for sailing and windsurfing instructors to teach sailing and windsurfing in other countries.
- Headquarters: 22 Lecha Street, Warsaw, Poland
- Location(s): Etude Verrey & Terrier – notaires, 85, avenue Général-Guisan, CH-1009 Pully, Switzerland
- Coordinates: 52.283631°N 21.061004°E
- Website: https://issa.global

The International Sailing Schools Association also known as ISSA is an international organization associating 3,500 sailing schools from all over the world. ISSA was founded in London and Paris in 1969 as a result of a joint initiative of the sailing communities of France, Poland, Italy, Switzerland and Great Britain.

In 1982, the Parliamentary Assembly of the Council of Europe granted the ISSA consultative status as an NGO.

In 2005 World Sailing discussed the role of ISSA at its annual conference.

== Presidents ==
- 1969–1973 – Guido Colnaghi
- 1973–1977 – Luc Gueissaz
- 1977–1984 – Roger Decombat
- 1984–1993 – Yves Aumon
- 1993–1997 – Veijo Meisalo
- 1997–2006 – Steve Colgate
- 2006–2008 – Martin Pryer
- 2008–2016 – Joan Basacoma
- 2019–present – Tomasz Lipski

[Source ISSA]
