= Madeleine Riffaud =

French poet, journalist and Resistance member (1924–2024)

- Riffaud in 1944
- Born: 23 August 1924; Arvillers, France
- Died: 6 November 2024 (aged 100); Paris, France
- Occupations: Resistance fighter; Writer; Journalist; War correspondent
- Works: Le Poing Fermé; On l'appelait Rainer
- Awards: Ordre national du Mérite; Friendship Medal of Vietnam

Marie-Madeleine Riffaud (23 August 1924 – 6 November 2024) was a French Resistance fighter, poet, journalist and war correspondent. After active resistance to the German occupation of France during World War II, in the course of which she was imprisoned and tortured, Riffaud reported for the Communist newspaper L'Humanité and other left-wing publications on the Algerian War (during which she survived an assassination attempt) and on the French, and subsequently American, wars in Vietnam. Her reporting on Vietnam was informed by four years she spent in the North in the early 1950s, and in the 1960s by the connections she developed in the South with the Viet Cong.

Her first poetry collection, Le Poing Fermé (The Clenched Fist), including poems written in prison, was published in 1945. A memoir giving them context, On l'appelait Rainer (Called Rainer), appeared in 1994.

== Resistance fighter ==
Riffaud was born on 23 August 1924 in Arvillers (Somme), a village that had been occupied by the Germans in 1870, and destroyed by their advance into France in 1914. Her parents, Gabrielle (Boissin) Riffaud, a devout Catholic, and Jean-Émile Riffaud were both teachers.

Riffaud acknowledged a political debt to her father. Jean-Émile had volunteered for service in the Great War, had been wounded and, in protest against "suicidal" offensives, had participated in the mutinies of 1917. In 1936, when the Spanish Civil War broke out, he had wanted to volunteer for the Republic but was turned down because of "his bum left leg".

Riffaud was 15 when the Germans again invaded France in May 1940, and found herself in a column of refugees from the Somme strafed by the Luftwaffe. The experience, together with "a massive kick in the ass" delivered in a train station by Germans whose advances she had resisted, steeled her determination to resist the occupation.

Aged 18, Riffaud made contact with the Resistance in 1942, while recovering near Grenoble from tuberculosis she had contracted as student midwife. The director of her sanatorium would hide Resistance fighters and Jews with false medical certificates, and maintained a clandestine printing room. In Paris, after entering the leadership of its affiliated National Front of Medical Students, in 1944 Riffaud joined the Communist Party (PCF) and its resistance group Francs-tireurs et partisans (FTP). She operated under the codename "Rainer", chosen in homage to the Austrian-German poet Rainer Maria Rilke: her war, she insisted was "not with the German people, but with the Nazis”.

Although, the Allies, after successful landings, were approaching Paris both from the north and from the south of France, in summer of 1944 the Resistance in the capital were demoralised by the recent execution of twenty three members of one particularly audacious group, the Manouchians, and by the persistent Pétainiste propaganda denouncing the armed resisters as foreigners, Jews and criminals. In June, the Waffen-SS massacred 642 civilians in a village from Riffaud's childhood, Oradour-sur-Glane, prompting the FTP Resistance to direct its members to each kill a German. Riffaud recalled:

I have no hate. It was a mission. We had to do it in daylight, to encourage the population. To show them there was an opposition to the German occupation and it was French. I wanted to do more than simply harangue people in queues, telling them the truth of what was happening and I was cross at being told always to carry weapons across town for the men to use, so I asked for permission to use a gun myself.

On 23 July 1944, in broad daylight on a bridge overlooking the river Seine, she approached a lone German NCO and when he turned to face her ("it was important to me not to shoot him in the back”) she shot him twice in the temple. She later reflected: “Can one be mean, when one looks at the Seine? He was perhaps a good guy… but well, that’s war”. As she fled the scene on her bicycle she was knocked over by a car driven by French collaborator, a Milicien, who, before she could turn her gun on herself, had her handcuffed.

After two weeks of being whipped, electrocuted and half-drowned in Gestapo headquarters, she was incarcerated in Fresnes Prison. She had not named names, maintaining that she had acted alone to avenge the execution of a boyfriend. Minutes before she was scheduled for execution she was reprieved, only to be tortured for another ten days for her contacts. On 15 August she jumped from a train taking her to Ravensbrück concentration camp, but was recaptured.

Four days later she was freed in a prisoner exchange negotiated by the Swedish consul Raoul Nordling with Wehrmacht's last Paris commander, Dietrich von Choltitz. She immediately returned to the Resistance. On 23 August, in command of four men, and with the support of railway workers she trapped a train carrying loot and munitions in the Buttes-Chaumont tunnel and secured the surrender of the 80 German soldiers aboard. On the 25th she took part in an attack on the barracks on Place de la République, whose garrison had refused to accept von Choltitz's order to surrender.

After the Liberation of Paris, Riffaud was demobilised on 31 August 1944. She had hoped to finish the war with the rest of her resistance group, now part of the regular French army, but, at a time when women in France did not yet have the right to vote, she was told that she did not have her father's permission. Left behind in Paris, she found herself acting as a guide to the city for a young American soldier, the future singer Sammy Davis Jr.

== Poet, journalist and anti-colonial war correspondent ==
Riffaud said she owed her life to the surrealist poet Paul Éluard who encouraged her to write. "After what we'd been through", she explained that she, and her fellow resisters, "couldn't live like other people". She, in particular, was haunted by what she had been forced to witness under interrogation, the disfigurement, dismemberment and killing of other prisoners. With Louis Aragon, Vercors, and Pablo Picasso, Éluard was one of group of artist and writers who "virtually adopted her.

While working as a journalist for Ce soir, a newspaper run by Aragon, in 1945 Riffaud published her first poetry collection, Le Poing Fermé (The Clenched Fist), with a preface by Éluard and a sketch portrait of her by Picasso on the cover. Riffaud drew on her wartime experience for two stories published in the young-readers (Jeunesse héroïque) series of the PCF-aligned Éditions France d’abord: La belle vengeance de Bleuette (‘Bleuette’s vengeance’, 1945) and On s’est battu contre la mort (‘We fought against death’, 1946).

=== Anti-Colonialism ===
Riffaud understood support for anti-colonial struggle as a continuation of her wartime commitment to liberation of France: "a people who oppress another", she maintained, "can never be a free people". Allusions to the French Resistance would mark her later reporting from Vietnam (the Viet Cong as the "maquis") and from Algeria. She explained:

During the war, Germans tortured people I didn't know in front of me, saying they'd stop if I talked. They'd shout at me: "Look! Look!" I decided to make it my profession: To go out into the field, look at the truth and tell it. To bear witness, especially to act against colonialism: I didn't want France to do elsewhere what the Nazis wanted to do here.

Ruffaud's opposition to the Communist Party's participation in a post-war government, intent on reasserting French colonial authority, ended a brief marriage to Pierre Daix, a party member (and a friend and biographer of Pablo Picasso). Their young daughter, Fabienne, was to die in the care of Daix's parents of tuberculosis, which Riffaud believed she had passed to her.

=== Algeria ===
Already, in 1946, Riffaud was familiar with the violence of French rule in Algeria. She had hosted an Algerian high school student, the future writer and journalist Kateb Yacine, who bore witness to massacres in Algeria that had followed the Muslim demonstrations of 8 May 1945. In Paris, Riffaud supported the Movement for the Triumph of Democratic Liberties (MTLD), led by Messali Hadj, and their banned demonstration of 14 July 1953 which the police dispersed with deadly fire.

In 1952, and again 1954, La Vie Ouvrière, the press organ of the labour federation CGT, sent Riffaud to Algeria where she reported on the political and social tensions rising in advance of the Algerian insurrection. Initially, she covered the Algerian War for L’Humanité from Paris. She documented the torture and disappearance of Algerian activists in the city, repression that culminated in the 1961 Paris massacre when police killed, possibly, two to three hundred Algerians.

Returned to Algeria, in 1962 her vehicle was ambushed by the pro-settler Organisation Armée Secrète (OAS), who had condemned her to death. Severely injured and with partial eyesight loss, she was chased by the OAS for four days, before having to spend several months in hospital.

=== Vietnam ===
In July 1946, Riffaud met Ho Chi Minh in Paris where he had sought to negotiate an end to French colonial rule in Vietnam. A few months later, in November 1946, she published a poem in La Vie Ouvrière decrying the French bombardment of Haiphong (the opening salvo of the First Indochina War).

In Berlin, reporting on the 1951 World Festival of Youth and Students, Riffaud met and fell in love with the poet (and later, North Vietnamese Vice-State President) Nguyễn Đình Thi. She lived with him for four years in North Vietnam as Hanoi correspondent for L’Humanité and other left-wing publications. Their subsequent long-distance relationship lasted for 50 years.

Later, in the 1960s, she reported from South Vietnam where, with the Australian journalist Wilfred Burchett, she was embedded for eight weeks with the Viet Cong. Their work framed a documentary by film maker Roger Pic, Dans le maquis du Sud-Vietnam (1965). Riffaud also published Au Nord-Vietnam: écrit sous les bombes (1967), a diary of the North under American bombing.

== Later life ==
Upon her return from Vietnam in 1973, and after working in as a nursing assistant in a Paris hospital, she wrote her best-seller Les Linges de la nuit (1974) exposing the drudgery and poor work conditions of hospital workers. She also published another anthology of poems, Cheval rouge: anthologie poétique, 1939–1972.

In the mid-1970s, Riffaud moved discreetly away from the Communist Party and refused to talk about her past. It was only in 1994, on the 50th anniversary of the Liberation, that a former comrade, Raymond Aubrac, persuaded her to honour the memory of her friends who had died in the struggle by speaking publicly of her experience of the Resistance: That year a curator found some of her poetry, partly written in prison, and convinced her to write a memoir giving them context; this resulted in the book On l'appelait Rainer.

In 2001, in an award presented by Aubrac, President Jacques Chirac named Riffaud a Chevalier de la Légion d'honneur. In 2013, President Nicholas Sarkozy awarded her the Ordre national du Mérite for her contributions to France and the world. She received the Vietnamese Order of Resistance in 1984, and the Friendship Medal in August 2004, and was honoured for campaigning on behalf Vietnamese Agent Orange/dioxin victims.

Riffaud turned 100 on 23 August 2024. The occasion was marked by a visit from Vietnamese ambassador to France and the release of the final volume of her graphic war-time memoir, Madeleine, Résistante, created with artist Dominique Bertail and writer Jean-David Morvan.

Riffaud died on 6 November at her Paris apartment.

== Publications ==
- Le Poing fermé (1945), OCLC 221636699
- Le Courage d'aimer (1949), OCLC 716456722
- Les Carnets de Charles Debarge, documents recueillis et commentés par Madeleine Riffaud (1951), OCLC 491323883
- Les Baguettes de jade (1953), OCLC 459821049
- Le Chat si extraordinaire (1958), OCLC 726246392
- Ce que j'ai vu à Bizerte (1961), OCLC 86154465
- De votre envoyée spéciale... (1964), OCLC 3990784
- Dans les maquis "Vietcong" (1965), OCLC 6092724
- Au Nord-Vietnam : écrit sous les bombes (1967), OCLC 2846729
- Nguyễn Đinh Thi : Front du ciel (Mãt trãn trên cao) (1968), OCLC 492328562
- Cheval rouge : anthologie poétique, 1939–1972 (1973), OCLC 801235
- Les Linges de la nuit (1974), ISBN 978-2-7509-0139-4
- On l'appelait Rainer : 1939–1945 (1994), ISBN 978-2-260-01162-0
- La Folie du jasmin : poèmes dans la nuit coloniale (2001), ISBN 978-2-908527-89-6
- Bleuette (2004), ISBN 978-2-915293-12-8

In German

- Riffaud, Madeleine; Morvan, Jean-David; Bertail, Dominique (2022). Madeleine, Kämpferin der Résistance (in German). Berlin: avant-verlag. ISBN 978-3-96445-080-7. Graphic novel
