= Marie-Hélène Lefaucheux =

French activist

Chair of the United Nations Commission on the Status of Women
- In office 1948–1953

Personal details
- Born: Marie-Hélène Postel-Vinay; 26 February 1904 Paris, France
- Died: 25 February 1964 (aged 59) Lake Pontchartrain, Louisiana
- Spouse: Pierre Lefaucheux (m. 1925)
- Awards: Chevalier de la Légion d'honneur Croix de guerre Médaille de la Résistance

Marie-Hélène Lefaucheux (26 February 1904 – 25 February 1964) was a French women's and human rights activist. During World War II, she was a member of the French Resistance and orchestrated her husband's release from Buchenwald concentration camp after he was captured by the Gestapo. She was the sole woman in the French delegation to the first General Assembly of the United Nations. Lefaucheux helped found the UN's Commission on the Status of Women and was its chair from 1948 to 1953.

== Biography ==
=== Early life and education ===
Marie-Hélène Postel-Vinay was born on 26 February 1904 in Paris to Madeleine (née Delombre) and Marcel Postel-Vinay. She attended primary schools in Paris. She was one of the first two women to be admitted to the Ecole des Sciences Politiques and studied piano at École du Louvre. In 1925, she married industrialist and lawyer Pierre Lefaucheux, with whom she had no children, due to an accident she suffered in her youth.

=== French Resistance ===
During World War II Pierre and Marie-Hélène Lefaucheux became important members of the French Resistance. Their apartment in Paris was a crossroads of the underground and headquarters for an organisation that prepared packages for political prisoners and their families. From Spring 1942, Lefaucheux was in contact with Yvonne Churn, who distributed books to prisons. They managed to establish a system of communication with Parisian inmates and relayed information to families of prisoners in secret detention facilities. Their system led to the creation of the Comité des œuvres sociales de la Résistance (COSOR). She served as Vice President of the Paris branch of the French Committee of National Liberation. Lefaucheux became the representative of the CMO Parisian Liberation Committee in March 1944.

Pierre Lefaucheux was arrested by the SD in June 1944 and deported by train to Germany in August. Marie-Hélène followed the train on her bicycle to determine its destination. She followed him to Bar-le-Duc, hoping to get him released under the Nordling agreements. She later learned that her husband was imprisoned at the Buchenwald concentration camp and arranged to meet the head of the Gestapo in Metz. She convinced him to transfer Pierre to Metz. He was abandoned when the city was deserted due to the advancing allied front and the two were reunited in early September.

Following the war, she was awarded the National Order of the Legion of Honour, the Croix de Guerre and the Médaille de la Résistance with officer's rosette. Her husband went on to become Chair of the vehicle manufacturer Renault.

=== Political career and United Nations work ===
Following France's liberation, Lefaucheux was elected to the Constituent Assembly of the Provisional Government of the French Republic, representing the Organisation Civile et Militaire. She returned to the Constituent Assembly as a deputy in 1945 and was also elected to the Municipal Council of Paris, where she was vice president. In 1946, after the adoption of a new constitution, Lefaucheux was elected to the first Council of the French Fourth Republic.

Lefaucheux then became a member of the French delegation to the United Nations. She was the only woman in France's delegation to the inaugural session of the United Nations General Assembly in 1946. She was one of the fifteen founding members of the United Nations Commission on the Status of Women. She was designated by the National Assembly in 1946 to serve on the Council of the Republic. She remained on the Council of the Republic for only a session and resigned her office in 1947 to join the Assembly of the French Union. She was a Senator (MRP) under the Fourth Republic.

Lefaucheux was a founder of the Association des Femmes de l'Union Française, which was concerned with the welfare of Algerians and Africans. Of the organisation, she remarked, "It is for us to see that other women in other parts of the world are helped and encouraged".

Lefaucheux was President of the National Council of French Women from 1954 to 1964. Her husband died in a car accident in 1955, and following his death, she became France's Representative to the Commission on the Status of Women of the United Nations, one of the committees of the Economic and Social Council, where she assumed the presidency. In 1957, she was elected president of the International Council of Women. From 1959 to 1960, she served as vice president for the Assembly of the French Union, representing metropolitan France.

=== Death and legacy ===
Lefaucheux died on 25 February 1964, a day before her 60th birthday, on a return trip to New York when her flight, Eastern Air Lines Flight 304, crashed shortly after takeoff from New Orleans.

Upon her death, the International Council of Women noted:

Madame Lefaucheux had a statesmanlike brain, an indomitable fighting spirit for the advancement of women's education, rights and civil duties, a keen sense of strategy and tactics," adding "in her unceasing work for women of all races, as French Government representative on the United Nations Status of Women Commission, its delegate to the U.N. Human Rights Commission, and during her Presidency of the I.C.W., her achievements were outstanding.

Lefaucheux's role in the liberation of France and her rescue of her husband was alluded to in the 1966 film Is Paris Burning? The Foundation Marie-Hélène Lefaucheux was later established to help African women.

== See also ==
- Women in the French Resistance
