= Eastern Air Lines Flight 304 =

1964 aviation accident

Coordinates: 30.179°N 90.313°W

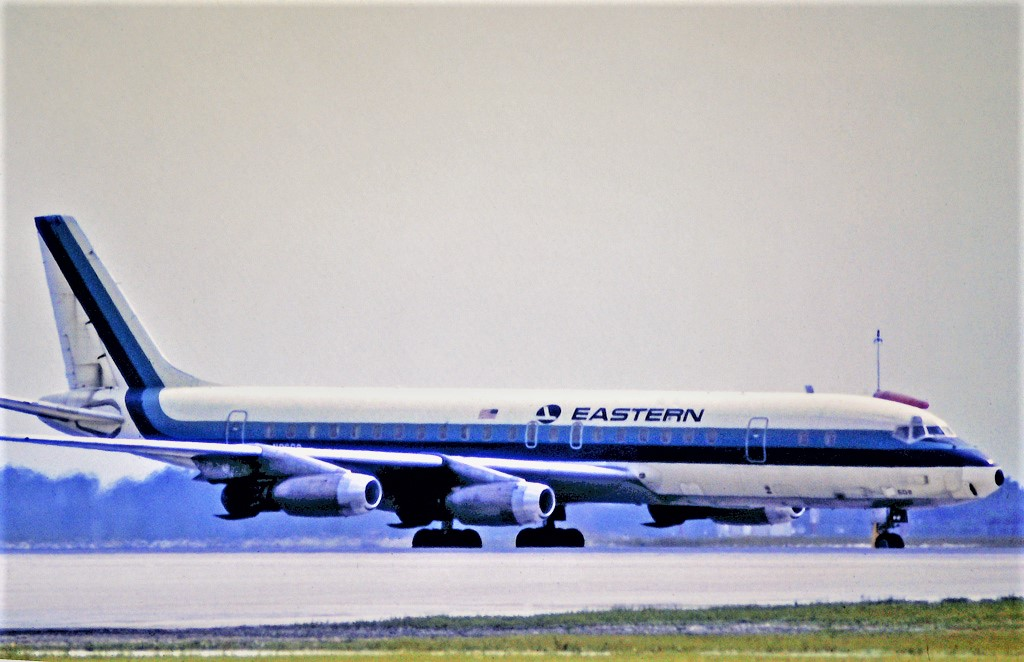
- A Douglas DC-8 of Eastern Air Lines, similar to the aircraft involved in the accident

Occurrence
- Date: February 25, 1964
- Summary: Loss of control caused by pitch trim failure
- Site: Lake Pontchartrain, near New Orleans, Louisiana, United States

Aircraft
- Aircraft type: Douglas DC-8-21
- Operator: Eastern Air Lines
- IATA flight No.: EA304
- ICAO flight No.: EAL304
- Call sign: EASTERN 304
- Registration: N8607
- Flight origin: Mexico City International Airport
- 1st stopover: New Orleans International Airport
- 2nd stopover: Atlanta International Airport
- 3rd stopover: Dulles International Airport
- Destination: John F. Kennedy International Airport
- Occupants: 58
- Passengers: 51
- Crew: 7
- Fatalities: 58
- Survivors: 0

Eastern Air Lines Flight 304, was a scheduled flight between Mexico City International Airport and John F. Kennedy International Airport with intermediate stops at New Orleans International Airport, Atlanta International Airport, and Dulles International Airport. On February 25, 1964, the Douglas DC-8 performing the flight crashed into Lake Pontchartrain approximately 19 miles northeast of New Orleans International Airport. All fifty-one passengers and seven crew were killed. Among the dead were American singer and actor Kenneth Spencer and Marie-Hélène Lefaucheux, a women's and human rights activist and member of the French delegation to the United Nations.

== Aircraft and crew ==
The accident aircraft was a Douglas DC-8-21, registration N8607. It was delivered to Eastern Air Lines on May 22, 1960, and had accumulated a total of 11,340 flight hours at the time of the accident. It was powered by four Pratt & Whitney JT4A-9 engines.

The crew consisted of Captain William B. Zeng (age 47), First Officer Grant R. Newby (39), Flight Engineer Harry Idol (39) and four flight attendants. Captain Zeng had accumulated 19,160 flight hours, of which 916 were in the DC-8. First Officer Newby had accumulated 10,734 flight hours, of which 2,404 were in the DC-8. Flight Engineer Idol had accumulated 8,300 flight hours, of which 1,069 were in the DC-8.

== Sequence of events ==
Flight 304 left New Orleans International Airport for Atlanta at 02:00 CST (local) on the second leg of a flight from Mexico City to New York City, with intermediate stops at New Orleans, Atlanta, and Washington, D.C. The aircraft disappeared from radar approximately five minutes after takeoff, at 02:05 local. Good visibility and calm winds prevailed at the time of the accident, although light rain was also falling. The Coast Guard and other searchers spotted wreckage hours later around dawn in Lake Pontchartrain, about 20 miles (32 km) northeast of New Orleans.

== Investigation ==
The subsequent investigation concluded that the jet crashed into Lake Pontchartrain en route due to "degradation of aircraft stability characteristics in turbulence, because of abnormal longitudinal trim component positions."

At least 32 of the passengers were making the through trip. Fourteen got on in New Orleans, while 14 were pass-riding Eastern employees. The four-engined plane, capable of carrying 126 passengers, was due in Atlanta at 3:59 a.m., at Dulles Airport in Washington at 5:53 a.m. and at Kennedy Airport in New York at 7:10 a.m.

The victims included Marie-Hélène Lefaucheux, a member of the French delegation to the United Nations, who was active in women's and human rights activities of the world body. The pilot...with Eastern 21 years, had flown over five million miles. The co-pilot...had almost two million miles on his flight log.

Coast Guard recovered parts of the wreckage, clothing, luggage and what was described as bits of bodies from a wide spread area centered 6 miles (10 km) south of the north shore of the lake and about 4 miles (6 km) east of the 23-mile (37 km)-long Lake Pontchartrain causeway. A [United States] Coast Guard pilot said there were indications that the plane had exploded either in the air or on impact. Eastern said that the crew had made the routine checks after take-off and that no alarm had been given. An experienced Eastern pilot said the jet had probably reached a height of 16,000 feet shortly after it had got over the lake.

— The New York Times, February 26, 1964

The water was only 20 feet (6 m) deep, yet only 60 percent of the wreckage was recovered because the breakup was so extensive.

The flight data recorder tape was too damaged to help the investigation. Instead, investigators used the maintenance records of the crashed aircraft and of other DC-8s, to conclude that the pilots had trimmed the horizontal stabilizer to the full nose-down position, to counter the excessive nose-up attitude that, in turn, was caused by a malfunctioning pitch trim compensator that had extended too far. Once the upset occurred, it was not possible to trim the horizontal stabilizer back to the nose-up position, because of the severe G-forces generated by the crew's pulling back on the yoke after the upset.

== See also ==
- Aviation safety
- List of accidents and incidents involving commercial aircraft
- Trans-Canada Air Lines Flight 831
