= National School Sailing Association =

NSSA promotes sailing as part of the educational experience of young people

- Nickname: NSSA
- Formation: January 6, 1961; 65 years ago
- Founded at: London
- Type: Registered charity
- Registration no.: 285904
- Purpose: NSSA promotes sailing as part of the educational experience of young people.
- Headquarters: 9 Eagle Court, St. Neots, PE19 1TS, UK
- Website: https://nssa.org.uk

The National School Sailing Association or NSSA was formed after a meeting on 6 January 1961 at the London Institute of Education, held to create and approve officers, committee, and a constitution of a new organisation to promote and oversee the sport of sailing in schools in the United Kingdom. It is a charity and a membership organisation whose purpose is to run sail racing events for young people.

In 1969 the NSSA was one of the six organisations which worked to found the International Sailing Schools Association.

During the COVID-19 pandemic the NSSA cancelled its normal regatta programme and held an eSailing regatta instead.
