= Art cluster =

Online art movement

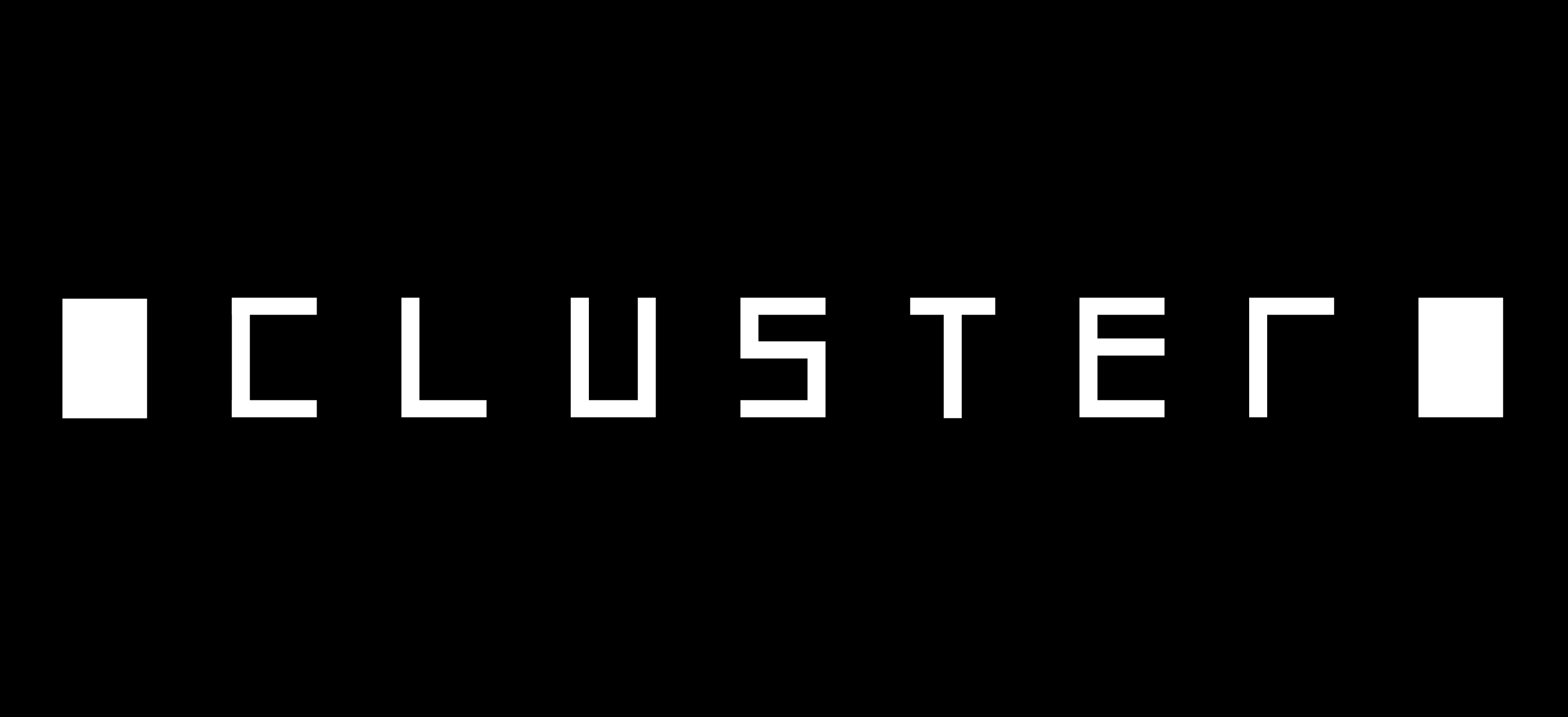
Art Cluster

Art Cluster, in global contemporary art scene, refers to a group of artists that work through the Internet to promote the free culture and many artistic values. The emerging telecommunications have developed a new form of communication, much faster and more direct. This allows people to work from anywhere in the world. People can easily group or perform any type of organization. Art Cluster also refers to the artistic production of collective intelligence. The integration of social movements in cyberspace is one of the potential strategies of this social movement.

== Precedents and precursors ==
In Manhattan in 2003, Bill Wasik, senior editor of Harper's Magazine, created the first Flash mob. A flash mob is a group of people who assemble suddenly in a public place, perform an unusual and seemingly pointless act for a brief time, then quickly disperse, often for the purposes of entertainment, satire, and artistic expression. Flash mobs began as a form of performance art. While they started as an apolitical act, flash mobs may share superficial similarities to political demonstrations. Flash mobs can be seen as a specialized form of smart mob, a term and concept proposed by author Howard Rheingold in his 2002 book Smart Mobs: The Next Social Revolution.

The convergence culture is an important factor in Art Cluster. Henry Jenkins determines convergence culture to be the flow of content across multiple media platforms, the cooperation between multiple media industries, and the migratory behavior of media audiences who will go almost anywhere in search of the kinds of entertainment experiences they want.

Art Cluster actions were captured in the form of itinerant exhibitions and printed editions of fanzines in 2005. This collective action was promoted by Jofre Oliveras, an artist and cultural manager who created the movement in Spain.

== Use of the term ==
The first documented use of the term Art Cluster as it is understood today was in 2011 in a blog entry posted in the aftermath of a cultural platform event from Girona. The term was inspired by the computing cluster that consists of a set of loosely connected computers that work together so that, in many respects, they can be viewed as a single system.

== See also ==
- Critical mass
- Art
- Next-generation network
- Flash mob
