= Family resemblance =

Philosophical idea popularized by Ludwig Wittgenstein

Family resemblance (German: Familienähnlichkeit) is a philosophical idea made popular by Ludwig Wittgenstein, with the best known exposition given in his posthumously published book Philosophical Investigations (1953). It argues that things which could be thought to be connected by one essential common feature may in fact be connected by a series of overlapping similarities, where no one feature is common to all of the things. Games, which Wittgenstein used as an example to explain the notion, have become the paradigmatic example of a group that is related by family resemblances. It has been suggested that Wittgenstein picked up the idea and the term from Friedrich Nietzsche, who had been using it, as did many nineteenth century philologists, when discussing language families.

The first occurrence of the term family resemblance is found in Arthur Schopenhauer (1788–1860; The World As Will and Representation §§17, 27, 28) who attributed the term to the school developed by Friedrich Wilhelm Joseph von Schelling (1775–1854). As demonstrated, Schopenhauer's polemical target is Henrik Steffens (1773–1845), a student of Schelling. The next occurrence appeared in a note from 1930, commenting on Oswald Spengler's ideas. The notion itself features widely in Wittgenstein's later work, and in the Investigations it is introduced in response to questions about the general form of propositions and the essence of language – questions which were central to Wittgenstein throughout his philosophical career. This suggests that family resemblance was of prime importance for Wittgenstein's later philosophy; however, like many of his ideas, it is hard to find precise agreement within the secondary literature on either its place within Wittgenstein's later thought or on its wider philosophical significance.

Since the publication of the Investigations, the notion of family resemblance has been discussed extensively not only in the philosophical literature, but also, for example, in works dealing with classification where the approach is described as "polythetic", distinguishing it from the traditional approach known now as "monothetic". Prototype theory is a recent development in cognitive science where this idea has also been explored. As the idea gained popularity, earlier instances of its occurrence were rediscovered e.g. in 18th-century taxonomy, in the writings of Lev Vygotsky or Władysław Tatarkiewicz.

== Philosophical context ==
The local context where the topic of family resemblances appears is Wittgenstein's critique of language. In Philosophical Investigations (§65-71), he compares the plurality of language use to the plurality of games, arguing that while games share certain overlapping features, there is no single characteristic common to all of them. This argument later became widely know under the heading of "language games."

More broadly, Wittgenstein's philosophy developed in opposition to essentialism, mental entities, and other forms of idealism that were accepted as a matter of fact in continental philosophy at the turn of the preceding century. In his view, such philosophical errors arise primarily from language and from its uncritical use. In the received view, concepts, categories or classes are taken to depend on necessary features common to all items covered by them. Abstraction is the procedure which acknowledges this necessity and derives essences. However, in the absence of a single common feature, this procedure necessarily breaks down.

== Terminology ==
The term "Family resemblance" as a feature of Wittgenstein's philosophy owes much to its translation in English. Wittgenstein, who wrote mostly in German, used the compound word Familienähnlichkeit, but as he lectured and conversed in English, he used 'family likeness' (e.g. The Blue Book, p. 17,33; The Brown Book,§66). However, in the Philosophical Investigations the separate word Ähnlichkeit has been translated as 'similarity' (§§11,130,185,444) and on two occasions (§§9,90) it is given as 'like'. The German family word is common, and it is found in Grimm's dictionary; a rare occurrence of 'family likeness' has been noted in a lecture by J. F. Moulton in 1877.

== Examples and quotes ==
Games are the main example considered by Wittgenstein in his text, where he also mentions numbers and makes an analogy with a thread. He develops his argument further by insisting that in such cases there is not a clear-cut boundary, but there arises some ambiguity if this indefiniteness can be separated from the main point.

In §66 Wittgenstein invites us to

consider for example the proceedings that we call "games"...[to] look and see whether there is anything common to all.

The section mentions card games, board games, ball games, games like ring-a-ring-a-roses and concludes:

And we can go through the many, many other groups of games in the same way; we can see how similarities crop up and disappear. And the result of this examination is: we see a complicated network of similarities overlapping and criss-crossing: sometimes overall similarities.

The following §67 begins by stating:

I can think of no better expression to characterize these similarities than "family resemblances"; for the various resemblances between members of a family: build, features, colour of eyes, gait, temperament, etc. etc. overlap and criss-cross in the same way. – And I shall say: "games" form a family.

and extends the illustration

for instance the kinds of number form a family in the same way. Why do we call something a "number"? Well, perhaps because it has a direct relationship with several things that have hitherto been called number; and this can be said to give it an indirect relationship to other things we call the same name. And we extend our concept of number as in spinning a thread we twist fibre on fibre. And the strength of the thread does not reside in the fact that some one fibre runs through its whole length, but in the overlapping of many fibres.

The problem of boundaries begins in §68

I can give the concept 'number' rigid limits ... that is, use the word "number" for a rigidly limited concept, but I can also use it so that the extension of the concept is not closed by a frontier. And this is how we do use the word "game". For how is the concept of a game bounded? What still counts as a game and what no longer does? Can you give the boundary? No. You can draw one; for none has so far been drawn. (But that never troubled you before when you used the word "game".)

== Formal models ==
There are some simple models which can be derived from the text of §66-9. The most simple one, which fits Wittgenstein's exposition, seems to be the sorites type. It consists in a collection of items Item_1, Item_2, Item_3... described by features A, B, C, D, ...:

Item_1: A B C D
Item_2: B C D E
Item_3: C D E F
Item_4: D E F G
Item_5: E F G H
......... . . . .

In this example, which presents an indefinitely extended ordered family, resemblance is seen in shared features: each item shares three features with its neighbours, e.g. Item_2 is like Item_1 in respects B, C, D, and like Item_3 in respects C, D, E. Obviously, what we call 'resemblance' involves different aspects in each particular case. It is also seen to be of a different 'degree' and here it fades with 'distance': Item_1 and Item_5 have nothing in common.

Another simple model is described as:

Item_1: A B C
Item_2: B C D
Item_3: A C D
Item_4: A B D
It exhibits the presence of a constant degree of resemblance, and the absence of a common feature without extending to infinity.

Wittgenstein rejects the disjunction of features or 'properties', i.e. the set {A, B, C, D,..}, as something shared by all items. He admits that a 'sharing' is common to all, but deems that it is only verbal:

if someone wished to say: "There is something common to all these constructions – namely the disjunction of all their common properties" – I should reply: Now you are only playing with words. One might as well say: "Something runs through the whole thread – namely the continuous overlapping of those fibres".

== Notable applications ==
- Thomas Kuhn uses Wittgenstein's concept in chapter V ('The Priority of Paradigms) of his famous The Structure of Scientific Revolutions (1962). Paradigms are not reducible to single discoverable sets of scientific rules, but consist of assumptions that relate to other rules that are recognized by parts of a scientific community.
- Morris Weitz first applied family resemblances in an attempt to describe art, which opened a still continuing debate.
- Umberto Eco argued that while regimes may differ wildly in their particulars, manifestations of fascism can be recognized by a kind of family resemblance.
- Renford Bambrough proposed that "Wittgenstein solved what is known as "the problem of universals'" and said of his solution (as Hume said of Berkeley's treatment of the same topic) that it is "one of the greatest and most valuable discoveries that has been made of late years in the republic of letters". His view provided the occasion for numerous further comments.
- Rodney Needham explored family resemblances in connection with the problem of alliance and noted their presence in taxonomy, where they are known as a polythetic classification.
- Eleanor Rosch used family resemblances in her cognitivist studies. Other cognitive research has shown that children and even rhesus monkeys tend to use family resemblance relationships rather than explicit rules when learning categories.

== Criticism and comments ==
Philosophical Investigations is the primary text used in discussing family resemblances, although the topic also appears in other works by Wittgenstein, notably The Brown Book. Many contributions to the discussion are by people involved in philosophical research but concerned with more pragmatic questions such as taxonomy or information processing. Hans Sluga has observed that "the notion of family resemblance... draws on two quite different sets of ideas, two different vocabularies, but treats them as if they were one and the same. The first is the vocabulary of kinship, of descent, of some sort of real and causal connection...the second is that of similarity, resemblance, affinity and correspondence."

Wittgenstein's insistence that boundaries do not really exist but can be traced arbitrarily has been described as conventionalism and more generally, the acceptance of his conception has been seen to present a refined nominalism.

== See also ==
- Francis Galton – British eugenicist, polymath, and behavioural geneticist (1822–1911)
- Composite portrait – Galton's technique for creating a generic image of all members of a photographed group
- Polyphyly – Property of a group not united by common ancestry
- Prototype theory – Theory of categorization in psychology
- Ship of Theseus – Thought experiment about identity over time
- Similarity (philosophy) – Relation of resemblance between objects
