= Morris Weitz =

American philosopher

Morris Weitz

Morris Weitz (/ˈwiːts/; July 24, 1916 – February 1, 1981) "was an American philosopher of aesthetics who focused primarily on ontology, interpretation, and literary criticism". From 1972 until his death he was Richard Koret Professor of Philosophy at Brandeis University.

== Biography ==
=== Personal life ===
Morris Weitz was born on July 24, 1916, in Detroit, his parents having emigrated from Europe (and his father having worked as a painting contractor). He was husband to Margaret (née) Collins ("an author and renowned scholar of French women, French culture and the French Resistance") and the father of three children, Richard, David, and Catherine (the former being a director of the Center for Political-Military Analysis and a senior fellow at the Hudson Institute). Morris Weitz died on February 1, 1981, in hospital in Roxbury after a long illness aged 64, having lived latterly in Newton, Massachusetts.

=== Tertiary education and academic career ===
Weitz obtained his BA in 1938 from Wayne State University. While doing graduate work in French history at the University of Chicago he met Bertrand Russell, which directed Weitz's interests towards philosophy. He received his Masters and, in 1943, his PhD in philosophy from the University of Michigan with a dissertation titled The Method of Analysis in the Philosophy of Bertrand Russell. During the course of his career he taught philosophy at the University of Washington (1944–45), Vassar College (1945–48), and Ohio State University (1954–69). In 1969 Weitz moved to Brandeis University where, in 1972, he was named Richard Koret Professor of Philosophy in 1972, a position he retained until his death. He was also a visiting professor at Columbia, Cornell, and Harvard. He was recognised with a Guggenheim Fellowship in 1959, and was also honored as a Fulbright Senior Scholar.

== Philosophical thought, influence, and criticisms ==
Weitz spent a year in Oxford which led to lifelong friendships with Oxford philosophers such as Gilbert Ryle, H.L.A. Hart, and Isaiah Berlin and, in 1953, the publication in The Philosophical Review of Oxford Philosophy (1953). In the same, according to Aaron W. Meskin writing in The Dictionary of Modern American Philosophers,"Weitz argued that postwar Oxford philosophy was not unified by any general meta-philosophical position but rather by a commitment to investigating the logic of concepts". Meskin notes that this "was a significant publication in the United States as it served for many as an introduction to postwar Oxford philosophy". Meskin suggests the work also "illuminates the course of Weitz’s career" - the "task of elucidating both ordinary and technical concepts" becoming central to his philosophical pursuits and his philosophical method becoming "one of conceptual analysis, so long as this pursuit is not understood to be predicated on the goal of providing necessary and sufficient conditions".

Weitz is perhaps best known for his "influential and frequently anthologized" 1956 paper "The Role of Theory in Aesthetics" which was to win him a 1955 Matchette Prize (an award now replaced by the American Philosophical Association book and article prizes). This essay explicitly modified the theory of art initially provided in his 1950 book Philosophy of the Arts which had been "[s]ubject to devastating criticisms from Margaret McDonald among others". In The Role of Theory in Aesthetics Weitz "overturned his original claim.. that his empirical and organic theory could produce a closed or real definition of art" according to Aili Bresnahan and it is "this revised version that many philosophers have considered the sine qua non in support of the position that theories of art should be 'open'". Supporters of Weitz's later view "for similar but non-identical reasons" include W.B. Gallie, W. E. Kennick and Benjamin R. Tilghman and detractors include M.H. Abrams, M.W. Beal, Lee Brown, George Dickie, and Maurice Mandelbaum.

Mandelbaum in his 1965 paper Family Resemblances and Generalizations Concerning the Arts refers to Weitz's paper and includes its author amongst those who, in support of the contention "that it is a mistake to attempt to discuss what art, or beauty, or the aesthetic, or a poem, essentially is" have made "explicit use of Wittgenstein's doctrine of family resemblances". Mandelbaum claims that though he has "placed this at the forefront of his discussion.. Professor Weitz [has] made no attempt to analyze, clarify, or defend the doctrine itself".

Weitz's 1956 paper has been, as Meskin notes, "one of the most influential works in contemporary philosophy of art, and... continues to generate debate and discussion".

In a 2021 monograph, Jason Josephson Storm argued that most attempts to answer Weitz's critique of a singular definition of art have failed, including those based on phenomenology and aesthetic experience. Storm critiques Weitz's appeal to "family resemblance" as ultimately circular, and instead suggests that Weitz's criticism points to broader issues surrounding the nature of social and natural kinds.

== Works ==
- Philosophy of the Arts, 1950
- Weitz, Morris (1956). "The Role of Theory in Aesthetics" (PDF). Journal of Aesthetics and Art Criticism. 15 (1): 27–35. doi:10.2307/427491. JSTOR 427491. Archived from the original (PDF) on February 3, 2018. reprinted in P. Lamarque and S. H. Olsen (eds), Aesthetics and the Philosophy of Art: The Analytic Tradition, (Oxford: Blackwell, 2004), pp. 12–18.
- Philosophy in literature (1963)
- Hamlet and the philosophy of literary criticism (1964) ISBN 978-0226892399
- editor of "Problems in aesthetics" (1959, ^{2}1970)

== See also ==
- American philosophy
- List of American philosophers
- Classificatory disputes about art
