= Glénan Islands =

Archipelago located off the coast of France

Coordinates: 47°43′18″N 3°59′54″W

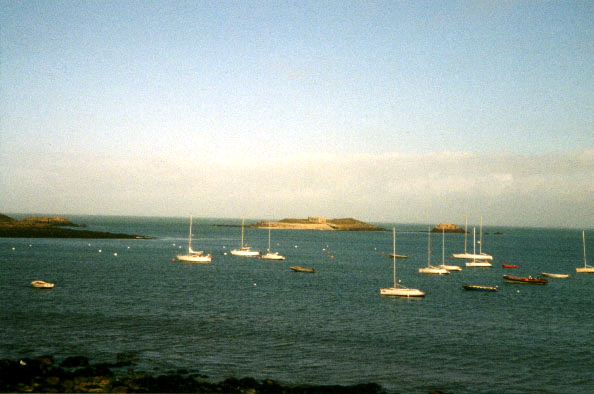
Brunec

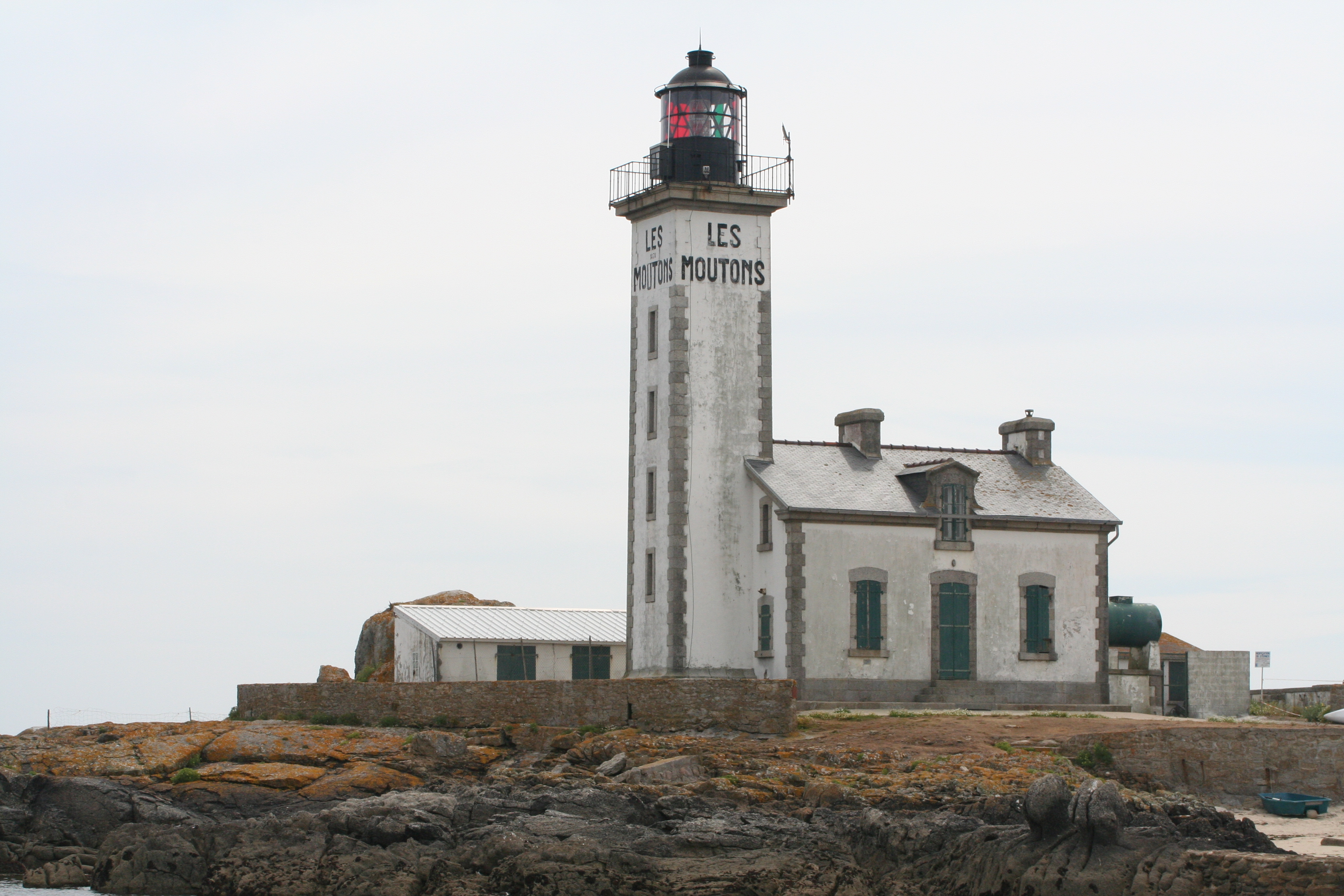
L'île aux Moutons' Lighthouse

The Glénan islands (French: Îles des Glénan [il de ɡlenɑ̃] or Archipel de Glénan [aʁʃipɛl de ɡlenɑ̃]; Breton: Inizi Glenan) are an archipelago located off the coast of France. They are located in the south of Finistère, near Concarneau and Fouesnant, and comprise nine major islands: Saint-Nicolas, the Loc'h, Penfret, Cigogne, Drenec, Bananec, Brunec, Guiriden and Guéotec. In addition, there are over a dozen smaller islets as Quignénec, Brilimec or Kastell Bargain. Île aux Moutons, halfway to the continent, is considered to be a part of the archipelago. Administratively, the islands belong to the commune of Fouesnant.

The Glénan islands have been home to the Glénans sailing school since it was founded in 1947. An international diving school is also present on the islands.

The islands are a popular tourist destination, particularly as a daytrip for those holidaying in the rest of Finistère. Both the presence of a shallow seabed and the availability of a catamaran with windows in its base have greatly contributed to this. It is difficult to stay on the islands overnight, as there is no hotel, and camping is forbidden. One or two small guesthouses exist. The islands are powered by a combined power plant.

In the 18th and early 19th centuries, the islands of the archipelago were known to the British as the Penmarch Islands.
