= George Dickie (philosopher) =

American philosopher (1926–2020)

- Born: George Thomas Dickie; August 12, 1926; Palmetto, Florida, U.S.
- Died: March 24, 2020 (aged 93); Bradenton, Florida, U.S.

Education
- Education: Florida State University; UCLA

Philosophical work
- Era: 20th-century philosophy
- Region: Western philosophy
- School: Analytic
- Institutions: University of Illinois at Chicago
- Notable students: Noël Carroll, Daniel Nathan
- Main interests: Aesthetics

George Thomas Dickie (12 August 1926 – March 24, 2020) was an American philosopher. He was a Professor Emeritus of Philosophy at University of Illinois at Chicago. His specialities included aesthetics, philosophy of art, and Eighteenth Century theories of taste.

== Education and career ==
He received a BA from Florida State University in 1949 and a PhD from the University of California, Los Angeles in 1959. He was a Guggenheim Fellow in 1978.

He served as President of the Illinois Philosophy Association (1990–91) and President of the American Society for Aesthetics (1993–94).

== Work ==
He was an influential philosopher of art working in the analytical tradition. His institutional theory of art inspired both supporters who produced variations on the theory as well as detractors.

One of his more influential works is The Century of Taste (1996), an inquiry into several eighteenth-century philosophers' treatments of the subject. The bulk of the work is devoted to championing David Hume's treatment of the subject over that of Immanuel Kant. A review of the work can be found in The Philosophical Review, 107:3 (July, 1998).

== Books ==
- Aesthetics: An Introduction (Pegasus, 1971)
- Art and the Aesthetic: An Institutional Analysis (Cornell University Press, 1974)
- The Art Circle (Haven Publications, 1984)
- Evaluating Art (Temple University Press, 1988)
- The Century of Taste (Oxford University Press, 1996)
- Introduction to Aesthetics: An Analytic Approach (Oxford University Press, 1997)
- Art and Value (Blackwell, 2001)
