= Défense de la France =

Issue of Défense de la France for 30 September 1943

Défense de la France (French pronunciation: [defɑ̃s də la fʁɑ̃s]) was an underground newspaper produced by a group of the French Resistance during World War II.

Essentially developed in the Northern Zone, Défense de la France distinguishes itself by an activity centered on the distribution of a clandestine newspaper created in August 1941 by a group of Parisian students. Philippe Viannay was the founder of it and the main editor. With a circulation of 450,000 in January 1944, it had the largest circulation of the whole clandestine press.

The niece of Charles de Gaulle, Geneviève, known later under the name of Geneviève de Gaulle-Anthonioz, was part of the founding group of the movement.

The newspaper denounced the attacks and actions of the army up until 1942. It firstly supported General Henri Giraud before turning to de Gaulle in June 1943. Not represented at the Conseil National de la Résistance (National Resistance Council), at the end of 1943 Défense de la France adhered to the Mouvement de Libération Nationale (National Liberation Movement), which participated in the foundation of the right-of-center Democratic and Socialist Union of the Resistance (UDSR).
