= Philippe Viannay =

French journalist (1917–1986)

Philippe Viannay (French pronunciation: [filip vjanɛ]; 15 August 1917, Saint-Jean-de-Bournay - 27 November 1986) was a French journalist.

== School foundation ==
He founded the Centre de formation des journalistes, and, later, the sailing school Les Glénans.

== French resistance ==
During World War II, he led a resistance movement named Défense de la France. They printed an underground journal which distributed up to 400,000 copies.

== Personal ==
The Canadian journalist Caitlin Kelly—who studied with Viannay at the Centre in Paris on an eighth-month journalism fellowship—later described him as "the most inspiring man I've ever met."

== Hélène Viannay ==
During the first year of the German occupation, Viannay married the former Hélène Mordkovitch. Hélène Viannay co-administered Les Glénans with her husband, and following Viannay's death became president of the association of Ancient Résistants of Défense de la France.

== Prix Philippe Viannay-Défense de la France ==
The French Fondation de la Résistance awards an annual prize for resistance-era histories, the Prix Philippe Viannay-Défense de la France.
