= Hans Waitz =

Early 20th-century German biblical scholar

Johannes Waitz, also Hans Waitz, was a German Biblical scholar specializing in the New Testament Apocrypha and source-critical studies. He was an Evangelical pastor in Darmstadt until 1927, and not to be confused with the Austrian Catholic bishop of the same name.

He was the advocate of a Petrine source text for Acts 8:5-25. and attempted to identify Papyrus Oxyrhynchus 840 as part of the lost Gospel of the Nazarenes. Waitz was the first to recognize parallel accounts in the two major pseudo-Clementines and postulated a "basic document" dated to the third century.

== Works ==
- Das Johannesevangelium Darmstadt 1887
- Das Pseudotertullianische Gedicht Adversus Marcionem 1901
- Judenchristliche Evangelien in ed. Edgar Hennecke Neutestamentliche Apokryphen 1904
- Geschichte des Wingolfsbundes Darmstadt 1904
- Texte Und Untersuchungen Zur Geschichte Der Altchristlichen Literatur: Volume 25
- Das Evangelium der zwolf Apostel ZNW 1 3 (1912): 338–48; 14 (1913):
