= Les Glénans =

French sailing school

- Services: Sail training
- Website: Ecole de voile les Glénans

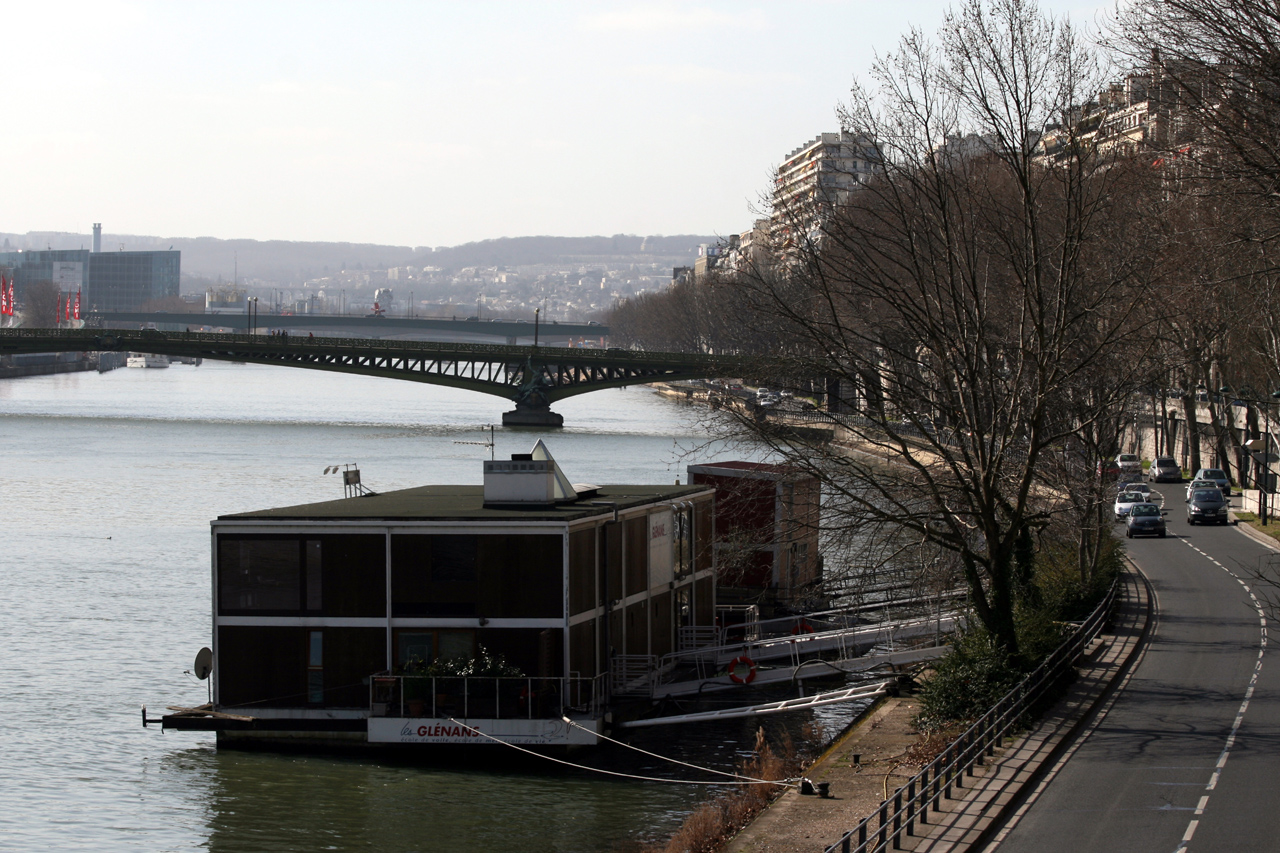
Glénans Nautical Center in Paris

Les Glénans is a French sailing school, operating as a non-profit organization. Most of its instructors are volunteers. It was founded in 1947 by Philippe and Hélène Viannay, who had been involved with the French Resistance during World War II. Its first site was the Glénan archipelago, about 10 nautical miles (20 km) off the coast of southern Brittany. Among its first boats was a 12-meter Bermudian cutter called Sereine, which is now a French listed monument and still sails after having been entirely refurbished in 2005.

Its headquarters are in Paris, France, and it operates five sites in France: Paimpol, l'Ile-d'Arz and l'Archipel (as the Glénan archipelago is referred to by Glénans adepts) in Brittany, Marseillan in Southern France and Bonifacio in Corsica. Sailing takes place in most of the western Mediterranean basin, the UK, Ireland, Norway and Sweden. Cruises cross the Atlantic Ocean and, in the past, have visited Iceland.

Les Glénans teaches catamaran sailing, dinghy sailing, kite surfing and windsurfing, but 70% of its activity is yachting. Every year up to 14,000 students and 800 instructors sail for 100,000 days.

The school also issues a book on sailing techniques. Initially, the idea of gathering knowledge on sailing and basic ship maintenance was for internal purpose as the founders were not seasoned sails men. They gathered information by being taught by local fishermen and sailors, organized the knowledge and improved it with experience and feedback from their members. Year after year, this book (called in French "Cours de navigation des Glénans") grew, and is now considered as a "must have" by sailing enthusiasts.

The fleet of Les Glénans consists of a wide variety of boats which are usually adapted specially for the purposes of the school. On the water, these boats are usually recognizable by a red stripe across the mainsail.

It has produced some of the world's best sailors, including world record holder Francis Joyon and Franck Cammas.

In 1969 along with Polish Yachting Association - Poland, Yacht Club de Morges - Switzerland, Casa di Vela Caprera - Italy, National Schools Sailing Association - UK, Centro Internacional de Navigacion de Arousa - Spain, Les Glénans co-founded the International Sailing Schools Association in London, sometimes stated as Paris
