= Friendship Medal (Vietnam) =

Vietnam Friendship Medal Huy chương hữu nghị
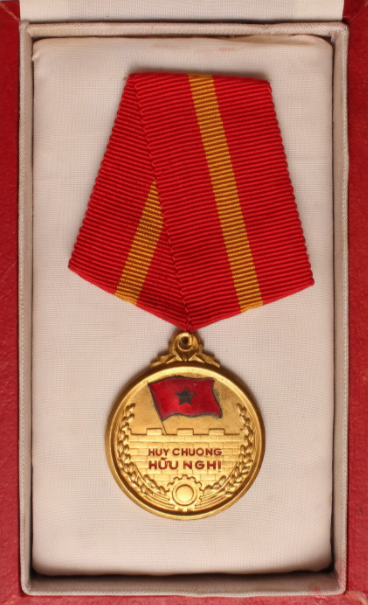
- Vietnam Friendship Medal
- Type: Single-grade order
- Awarded for: Contributions to the cause of the construction and defense of Vietnam
- Presented by: Government of Vietnam
- Eligibility: Foreign diplomats, world leaders
- Status: Currently awarded
- Established: November 26, 2003
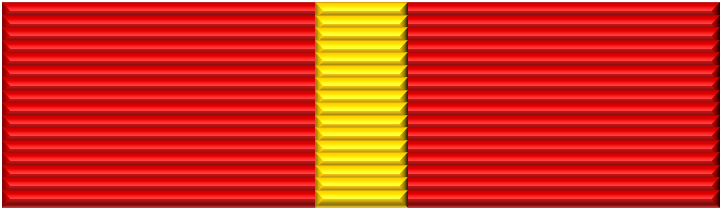
- Ribbon of the Friendship medal of Vietnam

The Vietnam Friendship Medal is a title of honor awarded by the Government of Vietnam to foreigners who have worked in Vietnam for a certain period, and made contributions to the cause of the construction and defense of Vietnam.

== Design ==
Decree No. 50/2006/ND-CP dated May 19, 2006 stipulates the specifications of the Friendship Medal as follows:

Article 19. “Friendship Medal”
"Red flag woven pentagonal Rayon silk medal band with two gold lines, 3 micron thick Nico-alloy plated red copper; Dimensions 38mm x 27mm x 40mm."

The medal body is a yellow circle with a diameter of 37mm, inside is a stylized gold pentangle, in the centre are two hands shaking hands in front of a globe, above are the words "Friendship Medal" (red), below is the word "Vietnam" (yellow) placed on the historical wheel and two branches on both sides, material of 3 micron thick Nico-alloy gold-plated red copper.

The obverse features the National Emblem of the Socialist Republic of Vietnam surrounding the Flag of Vietnam.

== Recipients ==
In 2013 Nancy Napier was given the award for leading training. She began work in 1994 at National Economic University. In 2015 Edward Danielraj Selvanayagam received the award from the Vietnamese President for the work of World Vision International in reducing poverty in the country. In 2019 Susan Hammond of the War Legacies Project received the award.
