= Seine-Saint-Denis's 4th constituency =

Constituency of the National Assembly of France

4th constituency of Seine-Saint-Denis
- inline Constituency of the National Assembly of France

- Deputy: Soumya Bourouaha; PCF
- Department: Seine-Saint-Denis
- Cantons: Le Blanc-Mesnil - La Courneuve - Dugny - Stains
- Registered voters: 67,437

The 4th constituency of Seine-Saint-Denis is a French legislative constituency in the Seine-Saint-Denis département.

== Deputies ==
Election	Member	Party
1988	Louis Pierna	PCF
1993	Louis Pierna	PCF
1997	Marie-George Buffet	PCF
2002	Marie-George Buffet	PCF
2007	Marie-George Buffet	PCF
2012	Marie-George Buffet	PCF
2017	Marie-George Buffet	PCF
2022	Soumya Bourouaha	PCF
2024	Soumya Bourouaha	PCF

== Election results ==
=== 2024 ===
Candidate	Party	Alliance	First round			Second round		
Candidate	Party	Alliance	Votes	%	+/–	Votes	%	+/–
Soumya Bourouaha	PCF	NFP	15,760	44.52	+8.79	19,486	69.98	-30.02
Mohamed Awad	LFI diss.		8,462	23.90	N/A	8,361	30.02	N/A
Colette Lévêque	RN		5,839	16.49	+5.22			
Hamza Rabehi	RE	ENS	2,429	6.86	-3.02			
Micaël Vaz	LR		1,982	5.60	+0.80			
Marlène Ley	LO		344	0.97	-0.04			
Amirdine Farouk	DIV		335	0.95	N/A			
Sonia Attig	DIV		105	0.30	-0.80			
Omar Mirali	DIV		102	0.29	N/A			
Matthieu Belin	DIV		25	0.07	N/A			
Virginie Pottier	DIV		16	0.05	N/A			
Valid votes			35,399	96.98	+0.02	27,847	87.60	+8.85
Blank votes			811	2.22	-0.19	3,227	10.15	-9.22
Null votes			291	0.80	+0.17	713	2.24	+0.37
Turnout			36,501	54.13	+21.94	31,787	47.11	+22.10
Abstentions			30,936	45.87	-21.94	35,681	52.89	-22.10
Registered voters			67,437			67,468		
Source: Ministry of the Interior, Le Monde
Result						PCF HOLD		

=== 2022 ===
Legislative Election 2022: Seine-Saint-Denis's 4th constituency
Party	Candidate	Votes	%	±%
PCF (NUPÉS)	Soumya Bourouaha	7,341	36.13	-6.14
PCF	Azzédine Taïbi*	4,355	21.43	N/A
RN	Colette Lévêque	2,290	11.27	+0.92
Agir (Ensemble)	Lova Rinel	2,007	9.88	−15.32
DIV	Aly Diouara	1,768	8.70	N/A
LR (UDC)	Mari-Claude Goureau	975	4.80	−12.72
REC	Vanessa Pettitt	625	3.08	N/A
Others	N/A	960		
Turnout		20,959	32.20	−1.03
2nd round result
PCF (NUPÉS)	Soumya Bourouaha	12,832	100.0	+40.39
Turnout		12,832	25.01	−4.61
PCF hold				

* Taïbi ran as a dissident member of the PCF, without the endorsement of the NUPES alliance. Despite qualifying for the second round, he withdrew his candidacy on 14 June, leaving Bourouaha as the only candidate.

=== 2017 ===
Legislative Election 2017: Seine-Saint-Denis's 4th constituency
Party	Candidate	Votes	%	±%
PCF	Marie-George Buffet	6,428	32.80	−0.84
LREM	Prisca Thévenot	4,939	25.20	N/A
LR	Christine Cerrigone	3,434	17.52	+0.80
FN	Gilles Clavel	2,029	10.35	−3.18
PS	Najia Amzal	1,300	6.63	−23.86
EELV	Nabiha Rezkalla	556	2.84	N/A
Others	N/A	910		
Turnout		20,261	33.23	−9.91
2nd round result
PCF	Marie-George Buffet	9,926	59.62	−40.39
LREM	Prisca Thévenot	6,723	40.38	N/A
Turnout		18,064	29.62	+4.64
PCF gain from FG		Swing		

=== 2012 ===
Legislative Election 2012: Seine-Saint-Denis's 4th constituency
Party	Candidate	Votes	%	±%
PCF (FG)	Marie-George Buffet	8,731	33.64	+1.38
PS	Najia Amzal*	7,914	30.49	+14.94
UMP	Thierry Meignen	4,339	16.72	−17.63
FN	Gilles Clavel	3,511	13.53	+8.15
Others	N/A	1,460		
Turnout		25,955	43.14	−6.27
2nd round result
PCF (FG)	Marie-George Buffet	15,031	100.00	+44.05
Turnout		15,031	24.98	−24.74
PCF hold				

* Withdrew before the 2nd round

=== 2007 ===
Candidate	Party	Alliance	First round			Second round		
Candidate	Party	Alliance	Votes	%	+/–	Votes	%	+/–
Thierry Meignen	UMP	MP	7,536	34.35	+10.51	9,702	44.05	+0.76
Marie-George Buffet	PCF		7,078	32.26	+3.01	12,324	55.95	-0.76
Marie-Pierre Ramos	PS		3,411	15.55	+0.32			
Alain Geoffrey	FN		1,180	5.38	-12.04			
Marc Boulanger	DVD		726	3.31	-0.96			
Francis Morin	LV		514	2.34	-0.23			
Virginie Megevand	LCR		484	2.21	+1.20			
Omar Mahi	DIV		339	1.55	-0.32			
France Barbet	EXD		189	0.86	N/A			
Carine Pelegrin Legris	DVE		178	0.81	N/A			
Sophie Robin	EXG		172	0.78	N/A			
Marie-France Roisin	DIV		121	0.55	N/A			
Soria Ourahmoune	DIV		12	0.05	N/A			
Valid votes			21,940	97.78	-0.47	22,026	97.56	+1.09
Blank and null votes			499	2.22	+0.47	552	2.44	-1.09
Turnout			22,439	49.41	-6.03	22,578	49.72	-0.77
Abstentions			22,974	50.59	+6.03	22,835	50.28	+0.77
Registered voters			45,413			45,413		
Source: Ministry of the Interior
Result						PCF HOLD		

=== 2002 ===
Candidate	Party	Alliance	First round			Second round		
Candidate	Party	Alliance	Votes	%	+/–	Votes	%	+/–
Marie-George Buffet	PCF		6,634	29.25	+1.73	11,498	56.71	-8.28
André Veyssière	UMP	UPMP	5,406	23.84	+5.11	8,778	43.29	N/A
Yves Baudouin	FN		3,951	17.42	-5.56			
Nicole Riou	PS		3,453	15.23	-3.23			
Marc Boulanger	DVD		969	4.27	N/A			
Jean-Yves Souben	LV		582	2.57	-0.96			
Omar Mahi	DVG		424	1.87	N/A			
Philippe Brard	LCR		228	1.01	N/A			
Michèle Coste	MNR		213	0.94	N/A			
Cécile Binart	LO		203	0.90	-1.92			
Françoise Robineau	PR		196	0.86	N/A			
Carine Pellegrin	GE		165	0.73	-0.73			
Jean-Yves Ramassamy	DIV		87	0.38	N/A			
Tanguy Lorre	PT		63	0.28	-0.57			
Soline Sicot	MEI		54	0.24	-0.75			
Martine Mazza	EXG		51	0.22	N/A			
Valid votes			22,679	98.25	+1.54	20,276	96.47	+4.69
Blank and null votes			403	1.75	-1.54	743	3.53	-4.69
Turnout			23,082	55.44	-5.80	21,019	50.49	-12.36
Abstentions				44.56	+5.80		49.51	+12.36
Registered voters			41,635			41,627		
Source: National Assembly
Result						PCF HOLD		

=== 1997 ===
Candidate	Party	Alliance	First round			Second round		
Candidate	Party	Alliance	Votes	%	+/–	Votes	%	+/–
Marie-George Buffet	PCF	GP	7,055	27.52	-1.20	16,232	64.99	+12.46
Yves Baudouin	FN		5,891	22.98	+4.58	8,743	35.01	N/A
André Veyssière	RPR	Union	4,802	18.73	-8.51			
Alain Ramos	PS	GP	4,734	18.46	+8.29			
Jean-Yves Souben	LV	GP	904	3.53	-2.40			
Philippe Gaillard	LO		723	2.82	+1.12			
Gilbert Auslander	LDI		389	1.52	N/A			
Salomon Sabbah	GE		374	1.46	N/A			
Sylvianne Lassarre	MEI		255	0.99	N/A			
Ramon Cobo	PT		218	0.85	+0.12			
Bernard Lemasson	DIV		170	0.66	N/A			
Jean-Yves Ramassamy	MDR		124	0.48	N/A			
Angel Segura	DIV		1	0.00	N/A			
Valid votes			25,640	96.71	+0.13	24,975	91.78	-3.03
Blank and null votes			873	3.29	-0.13	2,237	8.22	+3.03
Turnout			26,513	61.24	-3.09	27,212	62.85	-1.86
Abstentions			16,781	38.76	+3.09	16,082	37.15	+1.86
Registered voters			43,294			43,294		
Source: National Assembly
Result						PCF HOLD		

=== 1993 ===
Candidate	Party	Alliance	First round			Second round		
Candidate	Party	Alliance	Votes	%	+/–	Votes	%	+/–
Louis Pierna	PCF		7,827	28.72		14,137	52.53	
Andre Veyssiere	RPR	UPF	7,424	27.24		12,776	47.47	
Yves Baudouin	FN		5,016	18.40				
Gerard Fuchs	PS	AFP	2,772	10.17				
Patrick Benkemoun	LV	EÉ	1,615	5.93				
Nicole Fischer	NERNA		794	2.91				
Philippe Gaillard	LO		463	1.70				
Joel Demare	EXD		431	1.58				
Michele Gapin	DVE		367	1.35				
Jean-Yves Ramassamy	REG		256	0.94				
Edouard Ciejka	PT		198	0.73				
Christian Surmonne	EXG		92	0.34				
Valid votes			27,255	96.58		26,913	94.81	
Blank and null votes			965	3.42		1,473	5.19	
Turnout			28,220	64.33		28,386	64.71	
Abstentions			15,647	35.67		15,481	35.29	
Registered voters			43,867			43,867		
Source: Ministry of the Interior
Result						PCF HOLD		

== Sources ==
- French Interior Ministry results website: "Résultats électoraux officiels en France" (in French).
