= Convergences and Alternative =

Convergences and Alternative Convergences et alternative
- Abbreviation: C&A
- Founded: May 17, 2009
- Dissolved: February 7, 2014
- Split from: NPA
- Merged into: Ensemble!
- Headquarters: 18 Rue de Meudon; 92140 Clamart
- Ideology: Anticapitalism; Internationalism; Feminism; Ecologism; Democratic socialism Marxism
- Political position: Left-wing to far-left
- National affiliation: Left Front

Website
- convergencesetalternative.blogspot.fr

Convergences and Alternative (abbreviated as C&A) was a French political organization and member of the Left Front.

C&A was initially created on May 17, 2009, as an internal faction of the NPA, aiming to forge an alliance between the far left and the anti-liberal left. It left the NPA following the party's February 2011 congress and officially joined the Left Front in June 2011.

After five years of existence, the Convergences and Alternative faction decided at its national meeting on February 7, 2014, to dissolve itself and integrate into the Ensemble! movement.

== Initial objectives within the NPA ==
This faction was distinguished by its desire for alliances in both social struggles and electoral contexts with anti-liberal left groups. The main leaders of this faction came from a split in the Unir association and sought to organize within the NPA as an internal faction.

Its members supported an electoral alliance with the PCF and the PG during the 2009 European Parliament election in France, aiming to unite "anti-capitalist and anti-liberal forces" without preconditions regarding relations with the PS or permanence of such alliances. After the failure of discussions with these parties, Convergences and Alternative campaigned for the NPA during those elections.

At the time of its creation on May 17, 2009, Convergences and Alternative claimed a thousand supporters within the NPA. However, no internal vote ever confirmed this figure.

== 2011 NPA Congress and split ==
At the February 2011 NPA congress, the Convergences and Alternative faction supported Position 3, the most favorable to an electoral alliance with the Left Front. This platform received 27.20% of the votes from party members and 26.4% from delegates. Following the congress, C&A decided to leave the NPA and establish itself as an autonomous organization, a choice confirmed during its national council meeting on April 8-9, 2011. The organization joined the Left Front for the 2012 French presidential election and participated in its first campaign rally on June 29, 2011.

== Within the Left Front ==
In early 2013, Convergences and Alternative began a rapprochement process with the Anticapitalist Left, Unitary Left, and other factions like the FASE and The Alternatives. A joint newsletter and discussion bulletin titled Trait d'union was launched in January 2013. This process culminated in the creation of the Ensemble movement in November 2013. At its national meeting on February 7, 2014, Convergences and Alternative decided to dissolve itself to integrate into "Ensemble!"

== See also ==
- Official Blog
- Declaration of Formation
