= Ensemble! =

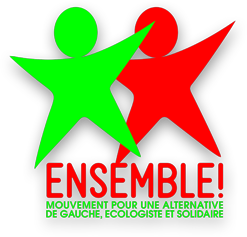
- Founded: 23 November 2013; 12 years ago
- Dissolved: 15 December 2025
- Merger of: Les Alternatifs; C&A; FASE; GA
- Merged into: L'Après
- Ideology: Socialism; Eco-socialism; Anti-globalisation
- Political position: Left-wing
- National affiliation: New Popular Front (2024–present); New Ecological and Social People's Union (2022–2024)
- International affiliation: Fourth International
- National Assembly: 0 / 577
- Senate: 0 / 348
- European Parliament: 0 / 74
- Departmental councils: 0 / 4,108
- Regional councils: 0 / 1,758
- Presidency of departmental councils: 0 / 101
- Presidency of regional councils: 0 / 17

Website
- ensemble-mouvement.com

Ensemble!, officially Ensemble – Movement for a Leftist, Ecologist, and Solidary Alternative (French: Ensemble – Mouvement pour une Alternative de Gauche, Écologiste et Solidaire), was a French left-wing political party, defining itself as anti-capitalist, anti-racist, feminist and eco-socialist. It was launched in November 2013 by several smaller groupings.

The movement was launched through the merge of Les Alternatifs, the Federation for a Social and Ecological Alternative (Fédération pour une alternative sociale et écologique, FASE), former factions of the NPA (Convergences et alternative and the Anti-Capitalist Left), a large majority of members from the Unitary Left (Gauche unitaire), and individuals who were not previously members of any political organization. ·

It became the third-largest component of the Left Front (Front de gauhce) with 2.500 members. The grouping was founded on several shared objectives : the strengthening, broadening, and democratization of the Left Front; the fight against austerity, productivism, and all forms of oppression; self-organization and a new relationship with social movements; and the development of a project for the social and ecological transformation of society to break with capitalism.

In 2017, Ensemble endorsed La France insoumise (LFI) candidate Jean-Luc Mélenchon in the presidential election. A number of activists were elected in the legislative elections on LFI tickets, notably Clémentine Autain.

In the following years, two internal currents emerged within Ensemble : Ensemble Insoumis and Ensemble Autogestion et Emancipation (Seld-management and Emancipation). A large portion of the membership did not align with either group. The pro-Insoumis half eventually split to form the Ecosocialist Left (Gauche écosiocialiste) in 2023, taking with it all of the movement's national elected officials. Two years later, a majority of the remaining members initiated a merger with L'Après, a party launched by several former figures of La France insoumise. A significant part of the Autogestion et Emancipation current refused to join L'Après and regrouped in the Réseau pour l'alternative (Network for the Alternative).

== History ==
The Anticapitalist Left (Gauche Anticapitaliste), a group formed in 2011 as a tendency within the Trotskyist-influenced New Anticapitalist Party (which it left in 2012) advocating an electoral strategy based on unity with other anti-neoliberal and anti-capitalist forces, in particular the Left Front; The Alternatives, a "red-green" organisation founded in 1988, some of whose roots go back to the Unified Socialist Party (French: Parti Socialiste Unifié, PSU), and influenced by the movement for workers' control or self-management (French: "autogestion"). The Federation for a Social and Ecological Alternative (Fédération pour une Alternative Sociale et Ecologique, FASE), a group formed in 2008, including many former members of the French Communist Party, and including the association Communistes Unitaires.

The membership of Ensemble is thus made up of activists coming from various left-wing and radical political traditions: altercommunist, trotskyist, feminist, "red-green", ecologist, etc., as well as trade unionists and global justice activists (alterglobalists).

Paid-up membership in June 2015 was approximately 1,200 (internal sources), with several hundred sympathisers.

The movement is a member of the Left Front (French: Front de Gauche), which also includes the French Communist Party and the Left Party (French: (Parti de Gauche)). The candidate of the Left Front, Jean-Luc Mélenchon of the Left Party, obtained 11.1% of the votes in the first round of the 2012 French presidential election.

Ensemble aims towards strengthening the Left Front by building a broad movement against austerity. It opposes all forms of inequality, racism, and oppression, including homophobia, islamophobia, and antisemitism, and seeks to develop links with anti-capitalist groupings outside the Left Front, including more left-wing members of Europe Ecology - The Greens (French: Europe Ecologie-Les Verts). Internationally, it has been involved in discussions and joint activities with the Party of the European Left, Podemos (Spain), Syriza (Greece), Sinn Féin (Ireland), the Left Bloc (Portugal), and others.

Ensemble was formally constituted at a conference held 31 January-1 February 2015 in Saint-Denis (Seine-Saint-Denis). Considering that the merger process had been successfully completed, most of its founding groups then decided to dissolve themselves.

A national delegate meeting takes place in principle 3 times per year. A national coordinating committee ("Equipe d'Animation Nationale, EAN") meets weekly. Its spokespersons include Myriam Martin, Clémentine Autain and Jean-François Pellissier.

Two former Members of Parliament, Jacqueline Fraysse and François Asensi, both former communists who left the French Communist Party in 2010, were, until it was dissolved in 2015, members of the FASE, one of the original constituent groups of Ensemble. An unknown number of local elected officials (including Mayors) and councillors are also members or associates of Ensemble.

Philippe Marlière, professor of political science at University College London, and a long-standing member of the French Socialist Party, and later of the New Anticapitalist Party, joined Ensemble in February 2015.

The headquarters of the movement is in Bagnolet (Seine-Saint-Denis), near Paris.

Ensemble! has a website which is regularly updated, and publishes bulletins, leaflets, and occasional brochures. Members of the movement are free to publish articles on the website, using a blog facility.

The movement holds an annual summer school (French: 'université d'été') in August. The first was held in Pau, with approximately 300 participants. The second took place at the university of Bordeaux from 22 to 26 August 2015, attracting approximately 420 participants.

In the 2017 legislative elections, three Ensemble! activists were elected under the banner of La France Insoumise (LFI), joining its parliamentary group : Clémentine Autain (then co-spokesperson of the movement) in Sevran, Danièle Obono in Paris, and Caroline Fiat in Meurthe-et-Moselle. Elles prennent leurs distances avec le mouvement par la suite They later took their distance form the movement. Muriel Ressiguier, an LFI MP elected in Hérault, joined Ensemble! in 2020.

During a National Collective meeting in mid-October 2017, members voted on three motions to define their relationship with LFI: a rapprochement maintaining two entities, a "search for convergences" while keeping total independence, or a full merger. These proposals obtained 46%, 47% and 16% of the vote respectively, marking a close proximity between the two organizations.

In May 2022, the centrist coalition Ensemble Citoyens (supporting President Emmanuel Macron) shortened its name to Ensemble. This provoked a legal reaction from the party Ensemble!, whose militants and leaders, including Clémentine Autain, launched a lawsuit for trademark infringement. The Judicial Court of Paris declared itself incompetent on 8 June 2022, inviting the party to refer the matter to the Constitutional Council.

Ten members of Ensemble! stood as candidates in the 2022 French legislative election. Four were elected: Clémentine Autain, Hendrik Davi, Michel Sala, and Marianne Maximi. All sat in the La France Insoumise-NUPES group.

In June 2022, the Ensemble Insoumis current renamed itself the Ecosocialist Left (Gauche écosocialiste). This evolution led to Ensemble! withdrawing from La France Insoumise. The Gauche écosocialiste subsequently became an autonomous party in March 2023, causing a split within Ensemble. As a result, the mouvement lost all of its national elected officials.

On 25 May 2025, following months of negotiations and a consultation of members, the party's General Assembly voted to merge with L'Après, a new party launched by several former figures of La France Insoumise.
