= Jacques Benoit =

French painter

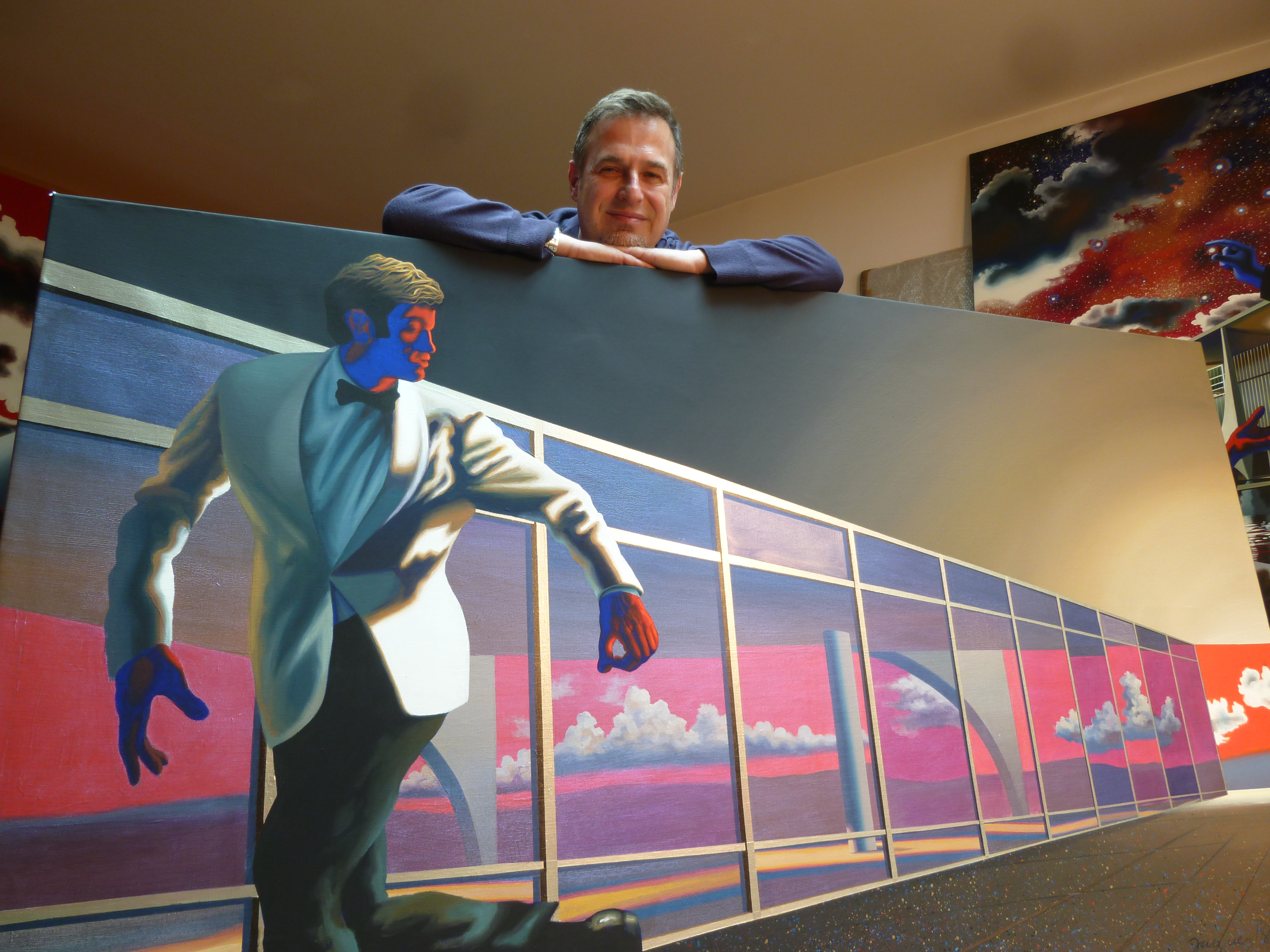
- Born: 22 June 1955; Algiers, Algeria
- Education: École Met de Penninghen
- Known for: Painting
- Movement: Figurative, narrative et symbolism

Jacques Benoit (born 22 June 1955) is a French painter.

== Biography ==
Born in Algiers in the French Algeria, Jacques Benoit left for France at the age of seven, after the Algerian independence war. He attended high school at Orléans and Nice, eventually settling in Paris, where he studied Graphic Arts at the Met de Penninghen Art School in the early 1970s.

As a young professional, Benoit worked in advertising agencies before taking the position of Creative Director at Euro Disney, between 1991 and 1995; followed by another two-year stint as Director of Creative at the Futuroscope Park, between 2000 and 2002.

The new century marked a turning point in Benoit's life, as the painter abandoned his career in advertising to commit himself full-time to the painting activities he had started in the mid-1990s.

== Style ==
Since the late 1990s, Benoit's work has been mostly inspired by Modern Architecture, including its Brazilian branch (inaugurated by the architect Lúcio Costa, and developed by his apprentice Oscar Niemeyer).

Pop Music is another strong influence on Benoit's paintings, which encompass figurative, narrative and symbolic trends. As primary influence, the painter quotes the music of Joni Mitchell. But also the music of Elton John, Rickie Lee Jones, Kate Bush, or Patti Smith, followed by the jazz music of Miles Davis, Shirley Horn and the Jazz Fusion composer Pat Metheny.

Occasionally Benoit's paintings can also make reference to Stanley Kubrick’s and Alfred Hitchcock’s films.

== Influences ==
=== The music of Elton John ===
In 1973 Elton John commissioned Jacques Benoit a series of artworks to be used in the promotional material for John's 1974 US & World Tour (tour book, T-shirts and posters).

Thirty years later, Benoit contributed to the Elton John AIDS Foundation by offering the singer a painting especially made for him, inspired by his composition Ballad of the Boy in the Red Shoes from his 2001 album Songs from the West Coast.

=== The music of Joni Mitchell ===
Passionate about the music of the Canadian composer and singer Joni Mitchell, Benoit produced, between 1977 and 1989, a series of works inspired by a selection of fifty poems drawn from her albums from Song to a Seagull (1968) through Chalk Mark in a Rainstorm (1988).

In the 1980s, Benoit and Mitchell met twice to discuss his works. On April 30, 1983, the painter presented a first selection of his works to Mitchell during her series of concerts in Paris at Théâtre des Champs-Élysées and Casino de Paris (Joni Mitchell World Tour, Wild Things Tour/1983).

Encouraged by this meeting, Benoit pursued his work, planning to publish a book with Mitchell's lyrics alongside his paintings. In 1987 the painter sent the book's mockup to Box in Wiltshire, England, where Mitchell was then recording her new album Chalk Mark in a Rainstorm at Peter Gabriel’s Real World Studios.

A second meeting took place in the Real World studio, where Benoit presented Mitchell with a series of new paintings. Altogether, Benoit's production comprises sixty gouaches, engravings (as monotype linocut prints), oil and large-format paintings on paper based on Mitchell’s texts. According to Benoit, it was this Joni Mitchell phase that led him to embrace his career as a professional painter.

=== The World Trade Center ===
In 2002 Benoit saw on the French TV channel France 3 the 9/11 documentary film about the terrorist attacks at the World Trade Center in New York. The film was directed by the then fireman James Hanlon and the French-American filmmakers Jules and Gédéon Naudet.

In the film, James Hanlon suggested an identical reconstruction of the destroyed towers, while the Mayor of New York City Rudy Giuliani advocated the construction of a 9/11 memorial alongside a brand new development.

Those opposing views inspired Benoit's own vision of the reconstructed towers, exactly as they were, with a memorial inserted into its original design.

In agreement with Gédéon Naudet, Benoit donated a triptych of his proposal to James Hanlon at the New York City Fire Department in Manhattan.

=== The architecture of Oscar Niemeyer ===
==== Exhibition: Brasilia. Flesh and Soul (1997, 2005, 2007, 2010, 2014) ====
In 1997, Benoit exhibited in Paris his first series of paintings inspired by the city of Brasilia (a place the painter visited for the first time in 1994). The paintings were followed by a new series of works, under the title Brasilia. Flesh and Soul, exhibited in art galleries and at the Maison du Brésil in Paris in 2005, 2007 and 2010. "Brasilia. Flesh and Soul" was also presented during the summer of 2014, in the French city of Châlons-en-Champagne, and inaugurated by former State Secretary and current Deputy and Mayor of Châlons, Benoist Apparu.

==== Brasilia. Travel towards Dawn (2004) ====
In 2003, the Brazilian architect Oscar Niemeyer received Jacques Benoit's proposal for a documentary film about the creation of Brasilia entitled Brasilia. Travel towards Dawn. The architect agreed to meet the artist in 2004 in Rio de Janeiro for a filmed interview, produced and directed by Benoit.

After the interview, Benoit offered the architect a painting representing his 1960's project for the Brasília International Airport. Niemeyer's modern airport had never been built due to divergences with the military dictatorship that ruled Brazil between 1964 and 1985. As a gesture of courtesy, Oscar Niemeyer offered the painter his sketches made during the interview.

Back in France, the painter made a 13-minute trailer out of the three-hour-long rushes he produced in Brazil. In the following years, Benoit met several French production companies who showed interest for the film. The project, however, never reached production stage due to lack of funding.

==== Exhibition: Three Traces of Oscar (2006) ====
In 2005, the director of the Espace Niemeyer cultural center at the French Communist Party Headquarters, Gérard Fournier, visited the Brasilia. Flesh and Soul exhibition at Maison du Brésil. He decided to host Benoit's next exhibition, Three Traces Oscar, in the party's headquarters, designed by Niemeyer himself.

This project involved the creation of a new series of paintings inspired by the three buildings projected by Oscar Niemeyer in the Paris metropolitan area: the headquarters of the French Communist Party in the Place du Colonel Fabien, the headquarters of the Bourse du Travail in Bobigny and the headquarters of the daily L'Humanité in Saint-Denis.

The Three Traces of Oscar exhibition opened at the Espace Niemeyer in November 2006, closing in March 2007. It consisted of 28 large format canvases and a series of monotype linocut prints. Among these works, A Painter’s Dream, a four-piece polyptych that imagined an allegorical meeting between Oscar Niemeyer, Stanley Kubrick and Kate Bush, as well as the painting Clouds, another allegorical meeting, this time bringing Oscar Niemeyer and Joni Mitchell together.

==== Exhibition: Château d’Ars (2009) ====
In 2009, the mayor of the city of La Chatre in the French region of Indre, Nicolas Forissier, invited Jacques Benoit to exhibit at the Château d'Ars's art galleries for a two-month event that combined different themes exploited by his work - with an emphasis on the canvas that paid tribute to Oscar Niemeyer's architecture.

The exhibition, including some samples of a series dedicated to Los Angeles and two canvases paying tribute to George Sand, was eventually called Oscar, Stanley, Joni, Rickie Lee, George, Kate et autres Corps et Âmes hantant les lieux du Monde (literally, Oscar, Stanley, Joni, Rickie Lee, George, Kate and others Bodies & Souls haunting the World’s Places).

==== 50th Anniversary of Brasilia (2010) ====
In 2009 the commission for the 50th Anniversary of Brasilia selected Benoit's works to be included in the official program to be held in the Brazilian capital in the following year. Benoit's exhibition, entitled Brasília. De Carne e Alma (Brasilia. Flesh and Soul) and organized in the Rubem Valentim Gallery at the Renato Russo Cultural Center, contained 27 large format paintings on canvas and paper, as well as monotypes by different techniques.

Brasília (2011): At the request of Gérard Fournier, the 50th Anniversary of Brasilia exhibition was presented in Paris, at the Espace Niemeyer during two months in the spring of 2011.

==== Brasilia. Half a Century of the Capital of Brazil (2013) ====
Brasilia. Half a Century of the Capital of Brazil is a traveling exhibition on the history of the city through a collection of documents, objects and photographs dating back to the 18th century. The show was held at Espace Niemeyer in Paris and presented a selection of Benoit's works. It also included the 2013 polyptych (A Ausência) The Absence, painted by Benoit. This symbolic work commemorates Oscar Niemeyer's death, occurred in December 2012. It portrays Niemeyer's loft on Copacabana beach, where he lived and worked, alongside Brasilia's cathedral, one of his most iconic projects. According to the painter, the polyptych was made under the influence of Melody Gardot’s music, from her 2012 album The Absence, as well as the composition Nenia by the Italian trumpeter Paolo Fresu.

=== Los Angeles and the music of Rickie Lee Jones ===
Tapping different architectural and urban sources, Benoit created in 2007 a series of canvas inspired by Los Angeles, CA, offering a kaleidoscopic nocturne vision of the city.

This vision, entitled Sur la Trace des Versants Ouest was inspired by the composition Traces of the Western Slopes by the American musician and composer Rickie Lee Jones, co-written by Sal Bernardi (seventh track on Rickie Lee Jones' 1981 Pirates album). An over eight-minute-long epic, jazzy and symphonic composition, which explores the confluences of Jazz Fusion, Blues and Rock, Traces of the Western Slopes is generally considered one of Rickie Lee Jones's best works of all time.

==== Exhibition: Sur la Trace des Versants Ouest ====
Series of nine large format paintings exhibited in Paris in November 2007.

=== The architecture of Orly Airport ===
In 2003, Benoit produced two canvases, Orly (South), inspired by the Orly Airport in Paris. Designed by the French architect Henri Vicariot, the 1962 building was renamed South Wing after the addition of a West Wing, and the construction of a new airport (Roissy-Charles-de-Gaulle) to the north of Paris.

Back to his Brazilian projects, the artist put aside the Orly airport series for several years. He was not back to the Orly phase until 2008, as he created a series of 11 new paintings under the influence of the jazz singer Shirley Horn, the soundtrack Miles Davis composed for Louis Malle’s film, Lift to the Scaffold, and the soundtracks of Claude Lelouch’s films Live for Life and A Man and a Woman, both composed by Francis Lai.

==== Exhibition: Orly (South) ====
In 2012, the gallery Dubois Friedland in Brussels presented the Orly (South) exhibition with the support of the French Embassy in Belgium.

Since then Benoit has been working on a sequel to Orly (Sud), with a new series of paintings inspired by Vicariot's works.

== Notes ==
http://www.jacquesbenoit.com/Accueil_page_UK.html
