= Christian Picquet =

French activist and politician

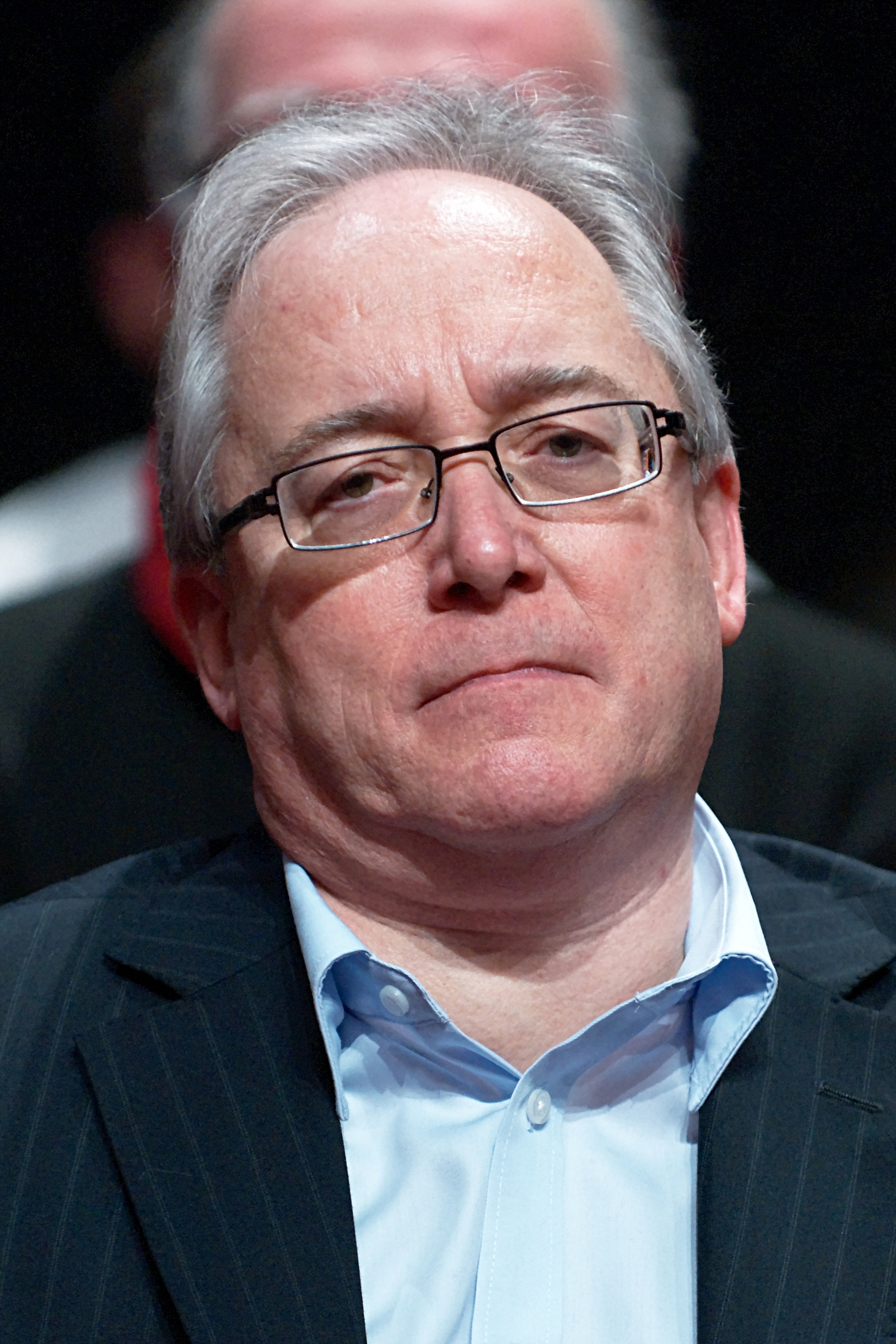
Christian Picquet in 2009

Christian Lamothe (born 1952 in Paris), better known with his pseudonym Christian Picquet, is a French activist and politician. He is the leader of the new Unitary Left party.

Picquet joined the Revolutionary Communist League (LCR) in 1968, but left the party in 1971 to join a smaller internationalist communist party. He rejoined the LCR in 1980 and was elected to the LCR's Politburo in 1984. As a member of the Politburo, he was responsible for the party's relations with other left-wing parties in France, and he developed the LCR's first relations with the larger French Communist Party (PCF).

Picquet was a member of the "Unir" movement within the LCR, which favoured at first close ties with other left-wing parties such as the French Communist Party rather than far left parties, before calling on the creation of a common party of the left with the PCF. This faction, known as Unir was a minority faction within the LCR and disappeared with the creation of the New Anticapitalist Party, the LCR's successor party.

In 2009, at the creation of the New Anticapitalist Party, he founded the Unitary Left with a part of Unir minority. The Unitarian Left joined the PCF-led Left Front. He was selected to be the third candidate on the Left Front's list in the Île-de-France constituency ahead of the 2009 European elections.
