= Ecosocialist Left =

French political organisation

Ecosocialist Left Gauche écosocialiste
- Founded: 2017 as Ensemble Insoumis·e; 2022 as Ecosocialist Left
- Split from: Ensemble! New Anticapitalist Party
- Headquarters: 26 Rue Malmaison, Bagnolet, Seine-Saint-Denis, France
- Ideology: Eco-socialism; Anti-capitalism; Soft Euroscepticism
- Political position: Left-wing
- National affiliation: La France Insoumise (2017–present); New Ecological and Social People's Union (2022–2024); New Popular Front (2024–present)

Website
- gauche-ecosocialiste.org

The Ecosocialist Left (French: Gauche écosocialiste, GES) is a French left-wing political organisation formed by activists from Ensemble! and the New Anticapitalist Party. Founded as Ensemble Insoumis·e in 2017, it adopted its current name in 2022.

== History ==
The Ecosocialist Left was created as a rebranding of the Ensemble Insoumis·e current to highlight eco-socialism as its central ideology. In May 2023, GES held a congress to formalize its internal structure, while remaining part of La France Insoumise with political and financial autonomy. In 2024, it expanded locally in the Basque Country, absorbing Ensemble Pays Basque.

== Ideology ==
GES identifies as eco-socialist, anti-capitalist, and soft Eurosceptic. It advocates for feminist, antiracist, LGBTQI rights, and disability justice as part of its broader anti-capitalist and ecological program. The party seeks systemic change combining ecological and social revolutions.

== Organization ==
The GES operates autonomously within La France Insoumise and has focused on regional development, particularly in the Basque Country.

It is also connected to the initiative L'Après, founded by Clémentine Autain, focused on social and ecological experimentation.
