= Anticapitalist Left (France) =

French political organisation

Anticapitalist Left Gauche anticapitaliste
- Abbreviation: GA
- Founded: November 6, 2011
- Dissolved: February 1, 2015
- Merged into: Ensemble!
- Ideology: Anti-capitalism; Ecosocialism; Feminism
- Political position: Left-wing
- National affiliation: Left Front
- Colors: Red; Green

Anticapitalist Left (French: Gauche anticapitaliste, GA) was a French organisation (2011–2015), member of the Left Front from 2012 to its dissolution in 2015.

It was founded in November 2011 as a public fraction of the New Anticapitalist Party (NPA), by the main animators of the former "B" position, which represented 40% of the internal votes in July 2011.

GA defines itself as 'eco-socialist'.

Within the NPA, the fraction argued in favour of the unity of left anticapitalist and antiliberal movements in France, considering that the formation of the Left Front, composed initially of the French Communist Party, the Left Party (a breakaway from the Socialist Party led by Jean-Luc Mélenchon) and later a small split from the Revolutionary Communist League (LCR), Unitary Left, had created the basis for a realignment of forces to the left of the Socialist Party.

Between the end of 2011 and the middle of 2012, many supporters of this fraction within the NPA left the party or ceased to be active within it. In the 2012 presidential election, some members and local groups of GA anticipated the decision to leave the NPA by campaigning for the Left Front's Jean-Luc Mélenchon. Others campaigned for the NPA's candidate, Philippe Poutou. (Mélenchon obtained a little over 11% of the vote in the first round, Poutou 1.15%.)

In July 2012, GA presented a motion to a national conference of the NPA, which obtained 22% of the votes. It then decided to leave the NPA to join the Left Front (Front de gauche, FdG). A paid-up membership of 558, overwhelmingly ex-members of the NPA and in many cases of the NPA's predecessor, the Revolutionary Communist League, was reported at a February 2013 national delegate meeting. Some individuals are currently members of both the NPA and GA.

In areas where the Left Front organises public activities, such as the holding of Citizens' Assemblies, local GA groups play an active part in promoting them; in others, where the Left Front exists mainly as an electoral cartel, the GA sees its role as helping to transform it into a permanent, interventionist organisation with a mass base. In both cases, GA members work to broaden the Left Front through involving activists who are not members of any of the constituent organisations.

Within the Left Front, Anticapitalist Left is involved in discussions with other member-organisations with a view to closer collaboration and a possible merger. It declined a merger proposal from the Left Party, preferring to continue discussions with all the member-organisations. However, it accepted an offer to send observers to meetings of the Left Party's National Council. A group of six member-organisations of the Left Front (Gauche Anticapitaliste, Convergences et Alternative, Gauche Unitaire, Fédération pour une Alternative Sociale et Ecologique, Les Alternatifs, République et Socialisme) publish a monthly newsletter, Trait d'Union, and will hold a national meeting on June 15, 2013, with a view to an eventual merger.

GA has a number of local elected representatives, including two members of the Limousin Regional Council, originally elected (in March 2010) on a joint PCF-PG-NPA ticket.

GA is not affiliated to an international organisation, though a few members are active in the Trotskyist Fourth International on an individual basis and others are sympathisers of the International Socialist Tendency. GA is involved in international solidarity campaigns and social forums, and supports the international Boycott, Disinvestment, Sanctions (BDS) movement in solidarity with Palestine. It has helped to popularise the resistance to austerity in Greece, Spain, Portugal and elsewhere and has contacts with the Greek Coalition of the Radical Left (Syriza) and the Left Bloc in Portugal, amongst other European parties and coalitions.

GA publishes press releases and articles on its national website. It does not currently publish a newspaper or review.

Following the national launch of a new movement, Ensemble - Mouvement pour une Alternative de Gauche, Ecologique et Solidaires, at a meeting held in Saint-Denis in January–February 2015, GA decided to dissolve.

Note: Gauche Anticapitaliste is also the name of an unrelated political organisation in Switzerland founded in 2009 and associated with the Trotskyist Fourth International.
