= Soumya Bourouaha =

French politician (born 1964)

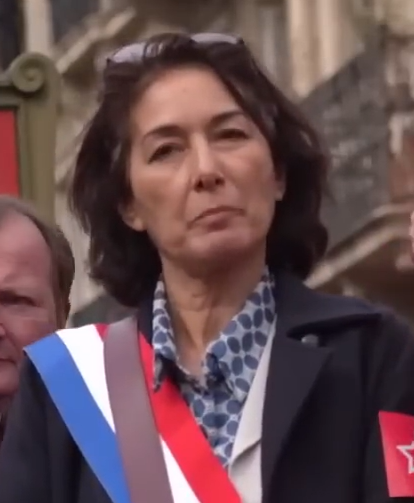

Member of the National Assembly for Seine-Saint-Denis' 4th constituency
- Incumbent
- Assumed office 22 June 2022
- Preceded by: Marie-George Buffet

Personal details
- Born: 16 March 1964 (age 61) Ghazaouet, Algeria
- Party: French Communist Party; NUPES; NFP

Soumya Bourouaha (born 16 March 1964) is an Algerian-born French politician from the French Communist Party. She became the Member of Parliament for Seine-Saint-Denis's 4th constituency in the 2022 French legislative election. She was re-elected in the 2024 French legislative election.

== See also ==
- List of deputies of the 16th National Assembly of France
- List of deputies of the 17th National Assembly of France
