= List of foreign delegations at 24th PCF Congress (1982) =

The following foreign delegations attended the 24th Congress of the French Communist Party in 1982:

- Afghanistan - People's Democratic Party of Afghanistan (PDPA)
- Angola - Movimiento Popular de Libertação de Angola - Partido do Trabalho (MPLA-PT)
- Algeria - National Liberation Front (FLN)
- Argentina - Communist Party of Argentina (PCA)
- Australia - Communist Party of Australia (CPA)
- Austria - Kommunistische Partei Österreichs (KPÖ)
- Bahrain - National Liberation Front - Bahrain
- Belgium - Parti Communiste de Belgique (PCB)
- Benin - People's Revolutionary Party of Benin (PRPB)
- Bolivia - Partido Comunista de Bolivia (PCB)
- Brazil - Partido Comunista Brasileiro (PCB)
- Britain - Communist Party of Great Britain (CPGB)
- Bulgaria - Bulgarian Communist Party (BKP)
- Cambodia - People's Revolutionary Party of Kampuchea (PRPK)
- Canada - Communist Party of Canada (CPC)
- Cape Verde - African Party for the Independence of Cape Verde (PAICV)
- Central African Republic - Front Patriotique Oubanguien - Parti du Travail de Centrafrique
- Chad - Front National de Libération du Tchad (FROLINAT)
- Chile - Partido Comunista de Chile (PCCh)
- Chile - Socialist Party of Chile (PS)
- China - Chinese Communist Party (CCP)
- Colombia - Colombian Communist Party (PCC)
- Comoros - Front National Uni des Komoriens-Union des Komoriens (FNUK)
- Congo - Parti Congolais du Travail (PCT)
- Cuba - Communist Party of Cuba (PCC)
- Cyprus - Progressive Party of Working People (AKEL)
- Czechoslovakia - Komunistická Strana Československa (KSČ)
- Denmark - Danmarks Kommunistiske Parti (DKP)
- Dominica - Popular Independence Committee (PIC)
- Dominican Republic - Dominican Communist Party (PCD)
- DPRK - Workers' Party of Korea (WPK)
- East Timor - Frente Revolucionária de Timor-Leste Independente (FRETILIN)
- Ecuador - Partido Comunista de Ecuador (PCE)
- Egypt - Egyptian Communist Party (ECP)
- Egypt - National Progressive Unionist Party (al-Tagammu)
- El Salvador - Frente Farabundo Martí de Liberación Nacional (FMLN)
- El Salvador - Partido Comunista de El Salvador (PCES)
- Ethiopia - Commission for Organizing the Party of the Working People of Ethiopia (COPWE)
- Finland - Suomen kommunistinen puolue (SKP)
- German Democratic Republic - Sozialistische Einheitspartei Deutschlands (SED)
- Greece - Communist Party of Greece (KKE)
- Greece - Panhellenic Socialist Movement (PASOK)
- Grenada - New Jewel Movement (NJM)
- Guadeloupe - Parti Communiste Guadeloupéen (PCG)
- Guinea - Parti Démocratique de Guinée (PDG-RDA)
- Guinea-Bissau - Partido Africano da Independência da Guiné e Cabo Verde (PAIGC)
- Guyana - People's Progressive Party (PPP)
- Haiti - Unified Party of Haitian Communists (PUCH)
- Hungary - Magyar Szocialista Munkáspárt (MSzMP)
- Iraq - Iraqi Communist Party (ICP)
- Iran - Tudeh Party of Iran
- Ireland - Communist Party of Ireland (CPI)
- Israel - Communist Party of Israel (Rakah)
- Italy - Partito Comunista Italiano (PCI)
- Japan - Japanese Communist Party (JCP)
- Jordan - Communist Party of Jordan
- Laos - Lao People's Revolutionary Party (LPRP)
- Lebanon - Lebanese Communist Party (LCP/PCL)
- Lebanon - Progressive Socialist Party (PSP)
- Lebanon - Mouvement National Libanais (MNL)
- Libya - General People's Congress (GPC)
- Luxembourg - Parti Communiste Luxembourgeois (PCL)
- Madagascar - Front National pour la Défense de la Révolution (FNDR)
- Mali - Front Malien de la Révolution et la Démocratie
- Malta - Partit Komunista Malti (CPM)
- Martinique - Martinican Communist Party (PCM)
- Mexico - Mexican Unified Socialist Party (PSUM)
- Mongolia - Mongolian People's Party (MPRP)
- Morocco - Parti du Progrès et du Socialisme (PPS)
- Morocco - Union Socialiste des Forces Populaires (USFP)
- Mozambique - Frente de Libertação de Moçambique (FRELIMO)
- Namibia - South-West Africa People's Organisation (SWAPO)
- Netherlands - Communistische Partij van Nederland (CPN)
- Nicaragua - Frente Sandinista de Liberación Nacional (FSLN)
- Nigeria - Socialist Party of Working People of Nigeria
- Norway - Norges Kommunistiske Parti (NKP)
- Pakistan - Communist Party of Pakistan (CPP)
- Palestine - Palestine Liberation Organization (PLO)
- Panama - Partido del Pueblo de Panamá
- Paraguay - Partido Comunista Paraguayo (PCP)
- People's Democratic Republic of Yemen - Yemeni Socialist Party (YSP)
- Poland - Polish United Workers' Party (PZPR)
- Portugal - Partido Comunista Português (PCP)
- Puerto Rico - Partido Socialista Puertorriqueño (PSP)
- Réunion - Communist Party of Réunion (PCR)
- Romania - Romanian Communist Party (PCR)
- Oman - Popular Front for the Liberation of Oman (PFLO)
- San Marino - Partito Comunista Sammarinese (PCS)
- San Marino - Partito Socialista Sammarinese (PSS)
- Spain - Communist Party of Spain (PCE)
- South Africa - African National Congress (ANC)
- Sudan - Sudanese Communist Party (SCP)
- Sweden - Vänsterpartiet Kommunisterna
- Syria - Arab Socialist Ba’ath Party
- Syria - Syrian Communist Party (SCP)
- Tunisia - Parti Communiste Tunisien (PCT)
- Turkey - Türkiye Komünist Partisi (TKP)
- Uruguay - Partido Comunista del Uruguay (PCU)
- United States - Communist Party USA (CPUSA)
- USSR - Communist Party of the Soviet Union (CPSU)
- West Germany - Deutsche Kommunistische Partei (DKP)
- West Germany - Sozialistische Einheitspartei Westberlins
- Western Sahara - Frente Popular para la Liberación de Saguía el Hamra y Río de Oro (POLISARIO)
- Yemen Arab Republic - National Liberation Front of Yemen Arab Republic (NLF)
- Yugoslavia - Savez Komunista Jugoslavije (SKJ)
