= Workers' Communist Party of France =

Far-left political party in France

Workers' Communist Party of France Parti communiste des ouvriers de France
- Abbreviation: PCOF
- Leader: Collective leadership
- Founded: 18 March 1979; 47 years ago
- Split from: Marxist–Leninist Communist Party of France
- Headquarters: Paris, France
- Newspaper: La Forge
- Ideology: Communism; Marxism–Leninism; Hoxhaism; Anti-revisionism; Anti-imperialism; Anti-racism; Anti-fascism
- Political position: Far-left
- National affiliation: Left Front (2011–2016)
- International affiliation: ICMLPO
- Colours: Red

Website
- pcof.net

The Workers' Communist Party of France (French: Parti communiste des ouvriers de France, PCOF) is a political party of France. The party publishes the monthly newspaper La Forge and is an active participant in the International Conference of Marxist–Leninist Parties and Organizations.

== History ==
The PCOF was established on 18 March 1979, on the anniversary of Paris Commune, after a split in the Strasbourg section of the Maoist Marxist–Leninist Communist Party of France (PCMLF). During the Cold War, the PCOF supported the political line of the Party of Labour of Albania. From October 2011 to March 2016, the party was a member of the Front de Gauche.

== La Forge gallery ==
Front page of the February 2007 issue of La Forge, depicting the party's old logo on the top left.

Front page of the September 2007 issue of La Forge, criticising president Nicolas Sarkozy's government. The PCOF's current logo is stylized into the name of the newspaper.

== See also ==
- List of anti-revisionist groups
