= Headquarters of the French Communist Party =

Building in Paris

- Interactive map of the Headquarters of the French Communist Party area
- Alternative names: Espace Niemeyer

General information
- Architectural style: Modernism
- Location: 2 Place du Colonel Fabien, Paris, France
- Coordinates: 48.8778°N 2.3719°E
- Construction started: 1968
- Completed: 1980
- Inaugurated: 1971
- Client: French Communist Party
- Owner: French Communist Party

Design and construction
- Architects: Oscar Niemeyer; Paul Chemetov; Jean Deroche; José L. Pinho; Jean-Maur Lyonnet
- Engineer: Jacques Tricot
- Other designers: Jean Prouvé
- Designations: Monument historique

Other information
- Public transit: Metro: Colonel Fabien, line 2; Jaurès, line 5; Bus: lines 46 and 75

Website
- espace-niemeyer.fr

The headquarters of the French Communist Party (French: siège du Parti communiste français) are located at 2 Place du Colonel Fabien in the 19th arrondissement of Paris. The lead architect was Oscar Niemeyer, who had previously designed many buildings for Brazil's new capital of Brasília.

== Description ==
It was designed in 1966 and works began in 1968. The building was inaugurated in 1971; its external dome was not fully completed until 1980. It was built in concrete and has curves. The dome, where the party's National Council sits, represents a pregnant woman according to the architect. Niemeyer, himself a communist, designed the building while living in exile in France during the military dictatorship in Brazil. In designing the building, Niemeyer collaborated with Paul Chemetov, Jean Deroche, José L. Pinho, Jean Prouvé, and Jacques Tricot.

In 2007, the building – a notable structure built in the style of Brutalist architecture – was classed as a monument historique. A survey by 20 minutes in 2020 found the building to be one that divided opinions the most among Parisians, alongside the Tour Montparnasse and the Sacré-Cœur.

== Other uses ==
When Robert Hue was party leader, it was agreed for fashion shows and filming to take place at the headquarters for extra income. The first was by Prada in 2000, followed by Thom Browne and Jean Paul Gaultier. Belgian singer Angèle filmed the video for "Jalousie" here, as did Alain Souchon for "Et si en plus, y a personne". The film Mood Indigo (2013) and the series Osmosis were also recorded here. As of 2012, the building only had 44 permanent staff, and was considered disproportionately large by Libération; national secretary Pierre Laurent said that the party would never sell the building.

In August 2008, the decision was made to rent out the top two of the six floors to private companies under the name Espace Niemeyer, which would save €3 million of an annual budget of €12 million. The first tenants were Autochenille Production, a comics and animation company.

== Gallery ==
Aerial view of the dome

Inside the dome

Rooftop view

== See also ==
- List of Brutalist structures
