= Roger Roche =

French political activist

Roger Roche was a French political activist in Senegal. He owned a repair shop. In 1925 he, along with two other persons, founded a cell of the French Communist Party in Rufisque. This was the first communist organisation in Senegal.

Later Roche left the party and joined the SFIO.
