= Pierre Laurent (politician) =

French politician

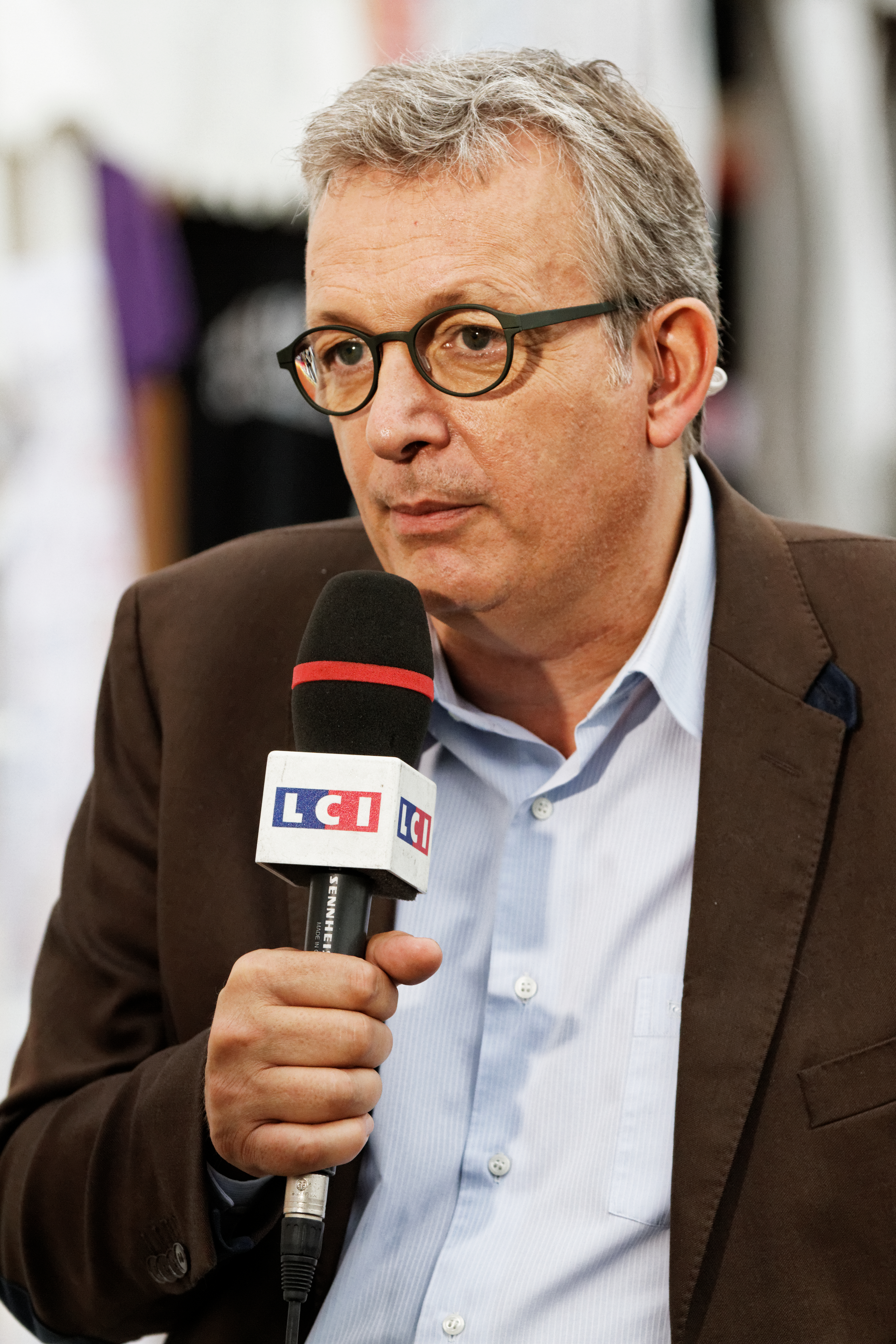
- Pierre Laurent in 2013

Member of the French Senate for Paris
- Incumbent
- Assumed office 20 September 2012
- Preceded by: Nicole Borvo Cohen-Seat

Member of the Regional council of Île-de-France
- In office 2010–2015

National Secretary of the French Communist Party
- In office 2010–2018
- Preceded by: Marie-George Buffet
- Succeeded by: Fabien Roussel

President of the Party of the European Left
- In office 5 December 2010 – 17 December 2016
- Preceded by: Lothar Bisky
- Succeeded by: Gregor Gysi

Personal details
- Born: 1 July 1957 (age 69) Paris, France
- Party: PCF
- Education: Pantheon-Sorbonne University
- Profession: Journalist

Pierre Laurent (born 1 July 1957) is a French politician and journalist. Ex-director of L'Humanité, and former leader of the French Communist Party (PCF).

== Career ==
His father, Paul Laurent, was a member of the National Assembly of France for Paris and a high-ranking official of the French Communist Party.

Pierre Laurent joined the Union of Communist Students (UEC) when he was studying economics in Paris. He was National Secretary of UEC from 1982 to 1985. After graduating with a master's degree in Economics, he became a journalist for L'Humanité. At first specialized in economic issues, he became chief editor in 1999, and managing editor in 2000.

He became a member of the French Communist Party National Council in 2000 (30th congress). He was the main writer of the 33rd Congress resolution in 2009, which he introduced. He was then nominated "national coordinator" (party's number 2), in charge of leading the party's collegial direction. He therefore resigned from L'Humanité.

In 2010, he led the list for the Left Front (together with Alternative citoyenne, les Alternatifs and others) in Île-de-France for the French regional elections. He received 6.55% of the popular vote.

Laurent was elected National Secretary of the French Communist Party in June 2010, replacing Marie-George Buffet.

Laurent supported Emmanuel Macron in the 2nd round of the 2017 French Presidential Election, opposing Marine Le Pen.

== Personal life ==
Despite reported financial difficulties, Laurent has collected more than €550,000 in wages within the space of 8 years.
