= Marie-George Buffet =

French politician (born 1949)

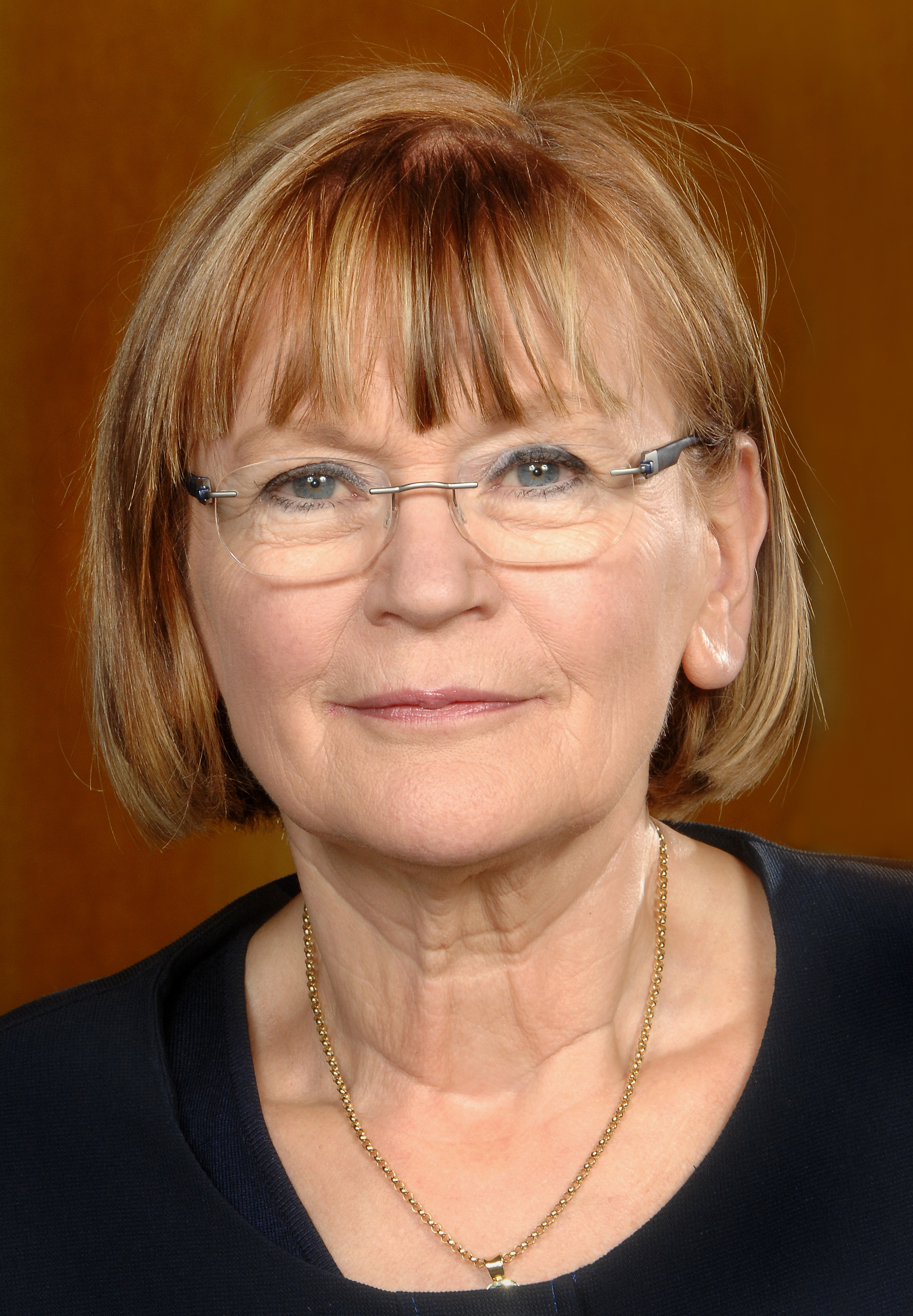
- Marie-George Buffet in 2012

Member of the National Assembly for Seine-Saint-Denis's 4th constituency
- In office 19 June 1997 – 21 June 2022
- Preceded by: Daniel Feurtet
- Succeeded by: Soumya Bourouaha

Minister of Youth Affairs and Sports
- In office 4 June 1997 – 6 May 2002
- President: Jacques Chirac
- Prime Minister: Lionel Jospin
- Preceded by: Guy Drut
- Succeeded by: Jean-François Lamour

National Secretary of the French Communist Party
- In office 2001–2010
- Preceded by: Robert Hue
- Succeeded by: Pierre Laurent

Personal details
- Born: Marie-George Kosellek; 7 May 1949 (age 77) Sceaux, France
- Party: French Communist Party
- Spouse: Jean-Pierre Buffet
- Children: 2

Marie-George Buffet, née Kosellek (French: [maʁi ʒɔʁʒ byfɛ]; born 7 May 1949) is a French politician. She was the head of the French Communist Party (PCF) from 2001 to 2010. She joined the Party in 1969, and she served in the government as Minister of Youth Affairs and Sports from 4 June 1997 to 5 May 2002. Buffet was re-elected on 16 June 2002 to another five-year term in the National Assembly as a representative of Seine-Saint-Denis.

She stood down from Parliament at the 2022 French legislative election.

== Life and career ==
Buffet was born in Sceaux, Hauts-de-Seine. Her father Paul Kosellek is of Polish descent.

Buffet was elected in 2001 as National Secretary of the Party, succeeding Robert Hue, who assumed the newly created presidency of the party. When Hue resigned after his poor score in the 2002 presidential elections, the post of president was removed, leaving Buffet as sole leader of the Party.

As head of the French Communist Party, Buffet speaks regularly on a variety of topics relating to the plight of the working people. Most of Buffet's speeches tend to focus upon practical implementations of the taxpayer's duty to provide for workers.

Other issues that Buffet is interested in and has spoken on are the Bolkestein Directive (a free trade directive issued by the European Union), energy initiatives, and ideological issues linked with stopping privatization and aiding the lower classes or working people. As a member of the French National Parliament, Buffet has begun to recognize the need to organize with the Communist and Socialist parties of other states within the EU.

This can be seen in the Marie-George Buffet Statement, which came out in June 2005. It constitutes a comment on the aftermath of the referendum on the establishment of further free trade rulings inside the European Union, one which was rejected by the a significant part of the Left. Buffet sees this French Communist victory as a victory for communists across Europe. She remarked:

I invite from the bottom of my heart men and women and organizations of the left, even those who might have voted "yes", to take your place, to participate with us in this noble adventure to construct another Europe, a genuine left wing alternative.

In 2009, she condemned as "irresponsible" and "criminal" statements by Pope Benedict XVI which claimed that condoms promote AIDS, although they in fact help prevent it.

On 28 February 2013, The Commission des affaires culturelles et de l’éducation, of which Buffet is part, voted in favour of an amendment proposed by Martine Faure, and favoured by Yves Durand, Martine Martinel and Buffet among others, that replaced the biological concepts of "sex", with the sociological concepts of "gender" in the national elementary curriculum. The elementary curriculum was successfully revised in September 2013 under the name "l'ABCD de l'egalite".

=== 2007 presidential bid ===
In 2006, Buffet took part in a "rally of the anti-liberal left", in an attempt to reconcile the PCF, the rest of the radical left, and anti-globalization militants, by the nomination of a common candidate for the 2007 French presidential election. As Buffet was voted as candidate by most members of the rally, several other participants fell out, denouncing the Communist Party's influence, effectively crippling the "anti-liberal left" and leaving Buffet as candidate for the sole PCF. Buffet had to compete with the radical-left candidacies of Olivier Besancenot, José Bové and Arlette Laguiller. She ended up receiving 1.93% of the popular vote (707,268 votes), the lowest result ever for a Communist presidential candidate in France.

== Political career ==
Governmental function

Minister of Youth and Sports : 1997-2002.

Electoral mandates

National Assembly of France

Member of the National Assembly of France for Seine-Saint-Denis : Elected in 1997, but she became minister in June / And since 2002. Elected in 1997, reelected in 2002, 2007, 2012.

Regional Council

Regional councillor of Ile-de-France : 1998-2002 (Resignation).

Municipal Council

Deputy-mayor of Chatenay-Malabry : 1977-1983.

Municipal councillor of Le Blanc-Mesnil : Since 2001. Reelected in 2008.

Political functions

National Secretary (Leader) of the French Communist Party : 2001-2010.

Political offices
Preceded by Guy Drut	Minister of Youth Affairs and Sports (France); 1997-2002	Succeeded by Jean-François Lamour
Party political offices
Preceded by Robert Hue	National secretary of the French Communist Party; 2001-2010	Succeeded by Pierre Laurent
