= Louis Pierna =

French politician (1933–2021)

Louis Pierna (16 January 1933 – 28 April 2021) was a French politician. He served as mayor of Stains from 1977 to 1996, and as a Deputy from 1988 to 1997.
