= Unitary Left =

Unitary Left Gauche unitaire
- Leader: Christian Picquet
- Founded: 14 March 2009
- Dissolved: 8 September 2015
- Merged into: French Communist Party
- Ideology: Anti-capitalism; Socialism; Democratic socialism
- Political position: Left-wing to far-left
- National affiliation: Left Front (2009–2014)
- European affiliation: Party of the European Left
- Colours: Red

Website
- www.gauche-unitaire.fr

Unitary Left (Gauche unitaire, GU) was a far-left French political party founded in 2009. The party was led by Christian Picquet, a former member of the Revolutionary Communist League and former leader of the association Unite. The party was dissolved and integrated into the French Communist Party (PCF) in 2015.

The creation of the party was announced on 8 March 2009 at the founding congress of the Left Front electoral coalition ahead of the 2009 European elections. Picquet, whose opposition faction represented 3.7% at the founding congress of the New Anticapitalist Party, disagreed with the majority's refusal to ally with the Communist-led Left Front for the European elections.

Other members from the same current remained in the New Anticapitalist Party, and formed the internal faction Convergences and Alternative on 17 May 2009.

The party was a member of the Left Front and Picquet was the third candidate on the coalition's list in the Île-de-France constituency.

Ideologically, the party sought to unite all democratic socialists opposed to neo-liberalism under a common front.

In the 2010 French regional elections, the GU, as part of the Left Front, had seven officials elected into office:

- Maïté Ballais (Auvergne)
- Armand Creus (Rhône-Alpes)
- Michelle Ernis (Upper Normandy)
- Jacques Lerichomme (Provence-Alpes-Côte d'Azur)
- Céline Malaisé (Île-de-France)
- Christian Picquet (Midi-Pyrénées)
- Nicole Taquet-Leroy (Nord-Pas-de-Calais)

On 29 April 2014, the GU left the Left Front, arguing the party was underrepresented as a founding member of the coalition and that the Front lacked a clear strategy or message.

On 8 September 2015, the PCF and GU released a joint statement on the dissolution of the GU and its merger with the PCF. This decision was taken to limit the division of the French left.

Two days later, Pierre Laurent, then National Secretary of the PCF, confirmed in a press conference that GU's members would participate fully within the PCF's party structure. Four GU leaders were given permanent seats on the PCF National Council, and Picquet was given a seat on the PCF National Executive Committee.
