= Left Front (France) =

French electoral alliance and political movement

Left Front Front de gauche
- Spokesperson in the Assembly: André Chassaigne
- Spokesperson in the Senate: Éliane Assassi
- Founded: 18 November 2008
- Dissolved: 25 November 2018
- Ideology: Left-wing populism Factions: Anti-capitalism Democratic socialism Eco-socialism Progressivism Soft Euroscepticism
- Political position: Left-wing
- European affiliation: Party of the European Left
- European Parliament group: European United Left–Nordic Green Left
- Colors: Red

Website
- placeaupeuple.fr

The Left Front (French: Front de gauche, FG or FDG) was a French electoral alliance and a political movement created for the 2009 European elections by the French Communist Party and the Left Party when a left-wing minority faction decided to leave the Socialist Party, and the Unitary Left (Gauche Unitaire), a group which left the New Anticapitalist Party. The alliance was subsequently extended for the 2010 regional elections and the 2012 presidential election and the subsequent parliamentary election.

In 2012, its constituent parties were, in addition to the two aforementioned parties, the Unitary Left (Gauche Unitaire), the Federation for a Social and Ecological Alternative (Fédération pour une alternative sociale et écologique, FASE), Republic and Socialism (République et socialisme), Convergences and Alternative (Convergences et alternative), the Anticapitalist Left (Gauche anticapitaliste), the Workers' Communist Party of France (Parti communiste des ouvriers de France, PCOF) and The Alternatives (Les Alternatifs).

== History ==
=== 2009 European elections ===
The Left Front was born as an electoral coalition between the French Communist Party (PCF) and the Left Party (PG) for the 2009 European elections.

The PCF's support had declined in years prior to the formation of the Left Front, and it hit a historic low in the 2007 presidential election, in which the PCF candidate, national secretary Marie-George Buffet, won 707,268 votes (1.9% of the vote.) The Left Party (PG) was founded in 2008 by Socialist Party (PS) senator Jean-Luc Mélenchon, a longtime leader of the PS' left-wing. Mélenchon, followed by PS deputy Marc Dolez quit the PS in the wake of the Reims Congress (2008), criticizing the PS' alleged shift towards economic liberalism.

The PCF's strategy since 2003 had been to actively reach out to social movements, trade unions, left-wing activists, and the plethora of small left-wing parties to the left of the PS, particularly Olivier Besancenot's New Anticapitalist Party (NPA). In October 2008, and again at the PCF's XXXIV Congress in December 2008, the PCF issued a call for the creation of a "civic and progressive front". The PCF's call was primarily intended for parties such as the PG, but also the NPA or Jean-Pierre Chevènement's Citizen and Republican Movement (MRC). Although Besancenot was not receptive to participation in the new PCF-PG alliance (he required guarantees on complete independence from the PS and expanding the alliance to the 2010 regional elections), a significant dissenting minority within the NPA, led by Christian Picquet's Unitary Left, supported such a common list and split from the NPA to join the new Left Front.

Negotiations with Chevènement's MRC also failed, but a pro-alliance minority split from the MRC to create Republic and Socialism and endorse the Left Front. The Federation for a Social and Ecological Alternative, The Alternatives and the far-left Workers' Struggle also rejected partaking in the alliance.

==== Top candidates ====
Out of the seven constituencies in which the FG nominated lists, three were led by members of the PCF, three by members of the PG, while one was led by someone unaffiliated with either party. The lists included PCF members (43.5%), PG members (33.5%) and figures from social movements or political associations (23%).

- East: Hélène Franco (PG)
- Île-de-France: Patrick Le Hyaric (PCF)
- Massif Central: Marie-France Beaufils (PCF)
- North-West: Jacky Hénin (PCF)
- Overseas: The Left Front supported the Alliance of the Overseas list led by Élie Hoarau
- South-East: Marie-Christine Vergiat, former leader of the Ligue des droits de l'homme
- South-West: Jean-Luc Mélenchon (PG)
- West: Jacques Généreux (PG)

==== Platform ====
For the European elections, the Left Front proposed:

- to ban market-based layoffs (licenciements boursiers) for companies which make profits
- a European minimum wage equal to 60% of the average salaries in each EU country
- a minimum wage at €1,700 per month in France
- a maximum wage at €360,000 per year and which cannot be more than 20 times the minimum wage in that company
- to protect and improve public services
- to fight for new rights for workers and the unemployed
- the right to a full retirement at 60
- to abandon the Treaty of Lisbon

==== Results ====
The Left Front and the Alliance of the Overseas won a combined 1,115,021 votes (6.47%), improving by 0.59% on the PCF's 2004 result. In all, they elected 5 MEPs. 2 of them were members of the PCF, one from the PG, one independent and one from the Reunionese Communist Party (PCR).

- East: 3.89% (no MEPs)
- Île-de-France: 6.32% (Patrick Le Hyaric)
- Massif Central: 8.07% (no MEPs)
- North-West: 6.84% (Jacky Hénin)
- Overseas: 21.01% (Élie Hoarau, Alliance of the Overseas)
- South-East: 5.90% (Marie-Christine Vergiat)
- South-West: 8.15% (Jean-Luc Mélenchon)
- West: 4.58% (no MEPs)

Nationally, the FG performed better than Besancenot's NPA, which obtained 840,833 votes (4.9%) and no seats. While the PCF's Marie-George Buffet appraised the result as "satisfying" and called on the continuation and expansion of the FG, the PG lamented the left's disunity by noting that a common list with the NPA could have won over 11% and up to 12 seats.

=== 2010 regional elections ===
All components of the FG pronounced themselves in favour of a continuation and expansion of the alliance for the 2010 regional elections, with the intention of attracting other left-wing parties (particularly the NPA). The PCF, PG, and GU announced, in a joint statement, their intention to create a permanent liaison committee for the FG, and build a shared platform with the goal of entrenching the FG as a political force. Negotiations with the NPA, once again, failed. The NPA demanded no alliances with the PS in the runoff and rejected participation in any PS-led regional executive, whereas the PCF supported second round alliances with the PS.

The FG ran autonomous and independent lists in the first round in 17 out of 22 regions in metropolitan France and Corsica. In 5 regions however, PCF members voted against the formation of autonomous lists and opted to back the PS following the first round, these regions were Brittany, Burgundy, Champagne-Ardenne, Lorraine, and Lower Normandy. The PCF alone ran an autonomous list in Corsica, led by Dominique Bucchini. The PCF's decision to endorse the PS incumbents following the first round in these five regions led to internal dissent within the party, and was met with the PG's opposition. The PG chose to run dissident, autonomous left-wing lists with the backing of the NPA in Burgundy, Champagne-Ardenne, and Lower Normandy; PCF dissidents in Brittany, Burgundy, and Lorraine chose to join common lists with the PG, and, in Burgundy, the NPA. Inversely, some Communists in the Pays de la Loire and Picardy decided to support the PS list by the first round. In Picardy, the FG also faced a rival list, led by the former PCF "orthodox" deputy Maxime Gremetz. Finally, notwithstanding the NPA's refusal to back the FG, the NPA ended up running common lists with the FG in Languedoc-Roussillon, Limousin and Pays-de-la-Loire.

The Left Front won 1,137,250 votes (5.84%) nationally, and an average of 7.5% taking into account only those regions where the FG ran. The FG won at least 4% in every region it ran in, excepting traditionally conservative Alsace (1.9%), and the FG won over 10% in four regions - Auvergne (14.2%), Limousin (13.1%), Nord-Pas-de-Calais (10.8%), and Corsica (10%). The FG merged their lists with the PS in all regions where they could do so (those where they obtained over 5%) with the exception of Languedoc-Roussillon, Limousin, and Picardy. In Limousin, the FG list did not come to an agreement with the PS list, hence it did not withdraw. In the runoff, Christian Audoin's FG-NPA list won 19.1%.

The FG's components won 124 seats in regional councils (in addition 2 seats for the NPA), 92 (90 excluding the NPA) of which were won on FG lists themselves. The PCF won 95 seats, 61 on FG lists and the rest on PS or other lists. The PG won 17, and the GU took 7. Compared to the 2004 regional elections, in which the PCF had won 185 seats, this represented a net loss. The PCF's leadership conceded that the FG had not won as many seats as they had hoped for, but they imputed the blame on FG's decision to run independently (in 2004, the PCF ran fewer autonomous lists, hence winning more seats by allying by the PS by the first round) as well as the growing weight of Europe Ecology – The Greens (EELV) within the left-wing bloc. The PG's national secretary, Éric Coquerel, said that while the FG came out weakened numerically, they came out strengthened politically.

However, what was considered a relatively poor result, in addition to the PCF's seat losses, created tensions and recriminations within the FG. PCF tendencies which opposed the leadership, and were cooler on the FG (namely, the "orthodox" and "rénovateurs") signaled their disapproval with the PCF leadership.

=== 2011 cantonal elections ===
The FG signaled its intention to run as many common candidates as it could in the 2011 cantonal elections. The PCF, despite its decline nationally, had maintained a strong presence at the local level, including in General Councils (cantonal elections elect the General Councils of every Department). The PCF's objective in 2011 was to hold on to the presidency of the Allier and Val-de-Marne, and regain the Seine-Saint-Denis (a historic PCF stronghold lost to the PS in 2008) and the Cher. Depending on the department, some candidates were supported by the NPA or the MRC.

Nationally, PCF and PG candidates won 8.9% of the vote together, and over 10% only in those cantons where the FG had a candidate. The FG became the second largest force on the left, surpassing the Greens (EELV). Although the PCF held on to the Allier and Val-de-Marne, it fell short in the Seine-Saint-Denis and the Cher although it enjoyed net gains of one seat in both of these departments. Overall, the PCF and PG won 121 seats (116 PCF, 5 PG); in 2004, the PCF alone had won 7.8% and 108 seats. The FG's creation and the political dynamic it created halted the PCF's decline.

=== 2012 presidential and legislative elections ===
The component parties of the FG decided to run a single, common candidate in the 2012 presidential election. Jean-Luc Mélenchon, the leader of the PG, officially announced his candidacy on 21 January 2011. He received the support of the Unitary Left (GU) and the FASE. On 5 June, the PCF's national delegates approved, with 63.6% against 36.4%, a resolution which included an endorsement of Mélenchon's candidacy as the Front's candidate. On 16–18 June, the PCF's members voted in favour of Mélenchon's candidacy in an internal primary. He won 59%, with PCF deputy André Chassaigne obtaining 36.8% and Emmanuel Dang Tran, an "orthodox" Communist, taking only 4.1%.

Mélenchon was later described as the "surprise" or "revelation" of the campaign, after his standing in polls jumped from around 5-7%, in the fall of 2011, to 14-15%, in the last weeks of the campaign. His open-air meetings were successful, attracting crowds of up to 120,000 people in Paris (18 March) and Marseille (14 April).

He proposed raising the minimum wage to €1,700; setting a maximum wage differential of 1 to 20 in all businesses, so that employers wishing to increase their own salaries would also have to increase those of their employees; setting social and environmental norms which businesses would have to respect in order to receive public subsidies; supporting social enterprise through government procurement; taxing imports which did not meet certain social and environmental norms; and reestablishing 60 as the legal retirement age with a full pension. The FG's platform endorsed "ecological planning" with the goal of building a green, sustainable economy, backed by a "green rule" (règle verte) to be entrenched in the Constitution. Mélenchon's platform supported raising taxes for the wealthy and creating a 100% tax rate for those with an income over €360,000 (thereby creating a maximum wage). Businesses who created jobs, paid higher wages and/or provided job training would receive tax cuts. Mélenchon also proposed to convene a constituent assembly to draft a constitution for a "Sixth Republic".

Mélenchon won 11.10%, or 3,984,822 votes, in the first round. Given his slight underperformance compared to the last polls, alongside Marine Le Pen's overperformance, the result was viewed as a relative disappointment by many FG members. Nonetheless, others in the alliance sought to underline Mélenchon's success. Indeed, by taking 11% of the vote, he won the best result for a PCF-affiliated candidate since Georges Marchais had won 15% in the 1981 presidential election. Furthermore, Mélenchon proved successful at coalescing voters to the left of the PS behind his candidacy, in 2002 and again in 2007 support for the 'radical left' on the PS' left had been split between many dissident candidacies.

Mélenchon did not explicitly endorse PS candidate François Hollande for the runoff, but he implicitly supported the PS candidate - and eventual winner - by calling on his supporters to defeat incumbent President Nicolas Sarkozy. On 24 April, the FG refused to participate in common meetings with other left-wing parties to support Hollande's candidacy but called for a mass demonstration on 4 May to defeat Sarkozy.

==== Legislative elections ====
The FG, which was defending 19 seats in the legislative elections, ran candidates in almost every constituency in France (560 out of 577 seats). About three-quarters of the FG's candidates (418) were members of the PCF, while 102 were members of the FG.

The FG called on other left-wing parties, including the PS and EELV, to form a 'common front' in about 60 constituencies where they foresaw a high risk that the left would be absent from the runoff, which they feared would instead oppose the far-right National Front (FN) to the right-wing Union for a Popular Movement (UMP). Negotiations between the different parties ultimately failed and no agreement was reached.

On 12 May, Mélenchon announced his candidacy in the Pas-de-Calais' 11th constituency in order to run against a nemesis of the left, Marine Le Pen, in her political base.

In the first round, FG candidates won 1,792,923 votes (6.91%), a result which was significantly lower than Mélenchon's result on 22 April. Although the FG's result was better than the PCF's result in the last legislative elections in 2007 (where it had won 4.3%) the FG nevertheless did unexpectedly poorly, with a number of FG incumbents falling into second place behind the PS in their constituencies. The PCF and PS having almost always applied a policy of 'mutual withdrawals' (désistement républicain) in runoff elections (whereby the weaker left-wing candidate drops out in favour of the stronger left-wing candidate); the application of this rule meant that the FG had only 9 incumbents who could be reelected. In the Pas-de-Calais, Mélenchon was defeated in the first round, placing third behind the FN and PS with 21.5%.

Notwithstanding the tradition of mutual withdrawal, incumbent deputy Patrick Braouezec in the Seine-Saint-Denis did not withdraw, forcing the FG to un-endorse him. Nevertheless, this was an isolated case - all other FG candidates who had qualified for the runoff but placed second behind a left-wing candidate dropped out; the few PS candidates in a mirror situation did likewise. In the runoff, the FG came out with 10 seats - reelecting 9 incumbents and gaining one seat, with former PCF deputy Patrice Carvalho (1997–2002) winning back his old seat in the Oise. Of the FG's 10 deputies, 7 were members of the PCF, 2 from the FASE, and one from the PG (Marc Dolez, who has since left the PG but still supports the FG).

With the support of left-wing deputies from overseas departments, the FG was able to save its parliamentary group, the Democratic and Republican Left (GDR), in the National Assembly.

== Composition ==
The following parties are member of the FG:

- French Communist Party (PCF): The PCF was the largest party in the FG in terms of members, officeholders, and financial resources. The PCF was founded in 1920.
- Left Party (PG): Jean-Luc Mélenchon's party describes itself as a left-republican and eco-socialist party. It was founded in 2008.
- Unitary Left (GU): Founded in 2009 by members of the former Revolutionary Communist League (LCR) who opposed the creation and direction of the New Anticapitalist Party (NPA).
- Republic and Socialism: Founded in 2009 by the minority faction in the Citizen Republican Movement (MRC) which supported the FG in the 2009 European elections. Officially joined in 2011.
- Federation for a Social and Ecological Alternative (FASE): Founded in 2008 and supported by some 'unitarian' or rénovateurs former members of the PCF. Officially joined in 2011.
- Anticapitalist Left (GA): Founded in 2011 by a minority faction of the NPA, it joined the Left Front in 2012. Anticapitalist and ecosocialist.
- Workers' Communist Party of France (PCOF): Supported some FG lists in 2010, joined in 2011.
- Convergences and Alternative (C&A): Founded in 2011 by a minority faction of the NPA.
- The Alternatives: Joined in late 2012 after having previously opposed membership.

The Alternatives, GA, C&A, the FASE, R&S and GU along with social movement activists are currently undergoing a regrouping process in the eventuality of founding a new organisation.

== Ideology ==
=== Political position ===
An ideologically heterogeneous coalition, the FG has been described as a communist, left-wing, radical left, anti-liberal left, anti-capitalist left, or far-left party. Jean-Luc Mélenchon himself has said that he does not consider himself of the far-left, and the far-left label has primarily been used for strategic reasons by the right. Marc Dolez, a former PG deputy who left Mélenchon's party in December 2012 while remaining active in the FG, argued that Mélenchon and the FG's strategy of attacking the PS has cornered the FG on the far-left. Political journalists and analysts including Vincent Tiberj and Laurent de Boissieu recused the far-left label for the FG, although some far-left parties are part of the alliance. Some political analysts believe that far-left is used by the right-wing Union for a Popular Movement (UMP) for strategic reasons, namely for the purposes of attacking the PS and justifying potential rapprochements between the UMP and the far-right National Front (FN).

=== Platform ===
Mélenchon and the FG's platform in the 2012 presidential election was broken up into nine overarching 'themes'.

- "Sharing the wealth and abolishing social insecurity" – banning market-based layoffs (licenciements boursiers) for companies which make profits, raise the minimum wage (SMIC) to €1,700, setting a maximum wage differential of 1 to 20 in all businesses, right to retirement with a full pension at 60, defending public services, stopping public sector spending cuts (RGPP), setting a maximum wage at €360,000, instituting a 35-hour workweek.
- "Reclaiming power from banks and financial markets" – changing the European Central Bank's policy to favour job creation and public services, controlling financial speculation, raising the capital gains tax and the solidarity tax on wealth (ISF), abolishing fiscal loopholes and privileges, taxing corporations' financial revenues, creating a 'public financial pole' to reorient credit towards jobs, innovation and sustainable development.
- "Ecological planning" – Nationalizing Électricité de France, Gaz de France and Areva to create a publicly owned energy sector, creating a national public water service, a new transportation policy promoting public transportation and taxing the transportation of non-vital merchandise.
- "Producing differently" – a new model of development and economic growth which respects the environment and individuals, redefining industrial priorities, new rights for employees, creating a Gross National Happiness indicator.
- "The Republic, for real" – Reaffirming the 1905 French law on the Separation of the Churches and the State, creating a ministry for women and equality, repealing the HADOPI law, regularizing illegal immigrants, opposition to the golden rule of fiscal balance, creating jobs in the public sector.
- "Convene a constituent assembly for the Sixth Republic" – convening a constituent assembly, repealing the 2010 local and regional government reform, proportional representation in all elections, reducing presidential powers and strengthening parliamentary powers, guaranteeing judicial and press freedom.
- "Repealing the Lisbon Treaty and creating another Europe" – repealing the Treaty of Lisbon, opposition to the European Fiscal Compact, proposing and adopting a new European treaty which would 'prioritize social progress and democracy', reforming the statutes of the European Central Bank.
- "To change the course of globalization" – withdrawing French troops from the war in Afghanistan, French withdrawal from NATO, recognizing the independence of a Palestinian state within 1967 borders, creation of a Tobin tax to finance international development and cooperation, debt forgiveness for low-income countries.
- "Prioritizing human emancipation" – creating jobs in public education, spending 1% of GDP on arts and culture, doubling investment in research.

The FG also supports same-sex marriage, same-sex adoption, voting rights for resident foreigners, euthanasia, and constitutional recognition of a woman's right to have an abortion.

== Electoral results ==
=== Presidential ===
Election	Candidate	First round		Second round		Result
Election	Candidate	Votes	%	Votes	%	Result
2012	Jean-Luc Mélenchon	3,984,822	11.10	-	-	Lost

=== Legislative ===
Election year	Leader	1st round		2nd round		Seats	+/−	Result
Election year	Leader	Votes	%	Votes	%	Seats	+/−	Result
2012	Jean-Luc Mélenchon	1,792,923	6.91%	249,498	1.08%	10 / 577	▼8	Opposition

=== European Parliament ===
Election year	# of votes	% of overall vote	# of seats won	±
2009	1,115,021	6.48 (#5)	5 / 72	Steady
2014	1,200,389	6.61 (#6)	4 / 74	▼1

== See also ==
- French Left
  - Citizen and Republican Movement
  - Génération.s
  - Independent Workers' Party
  - La France Insoumise
  - Ligue trotskyste de France
  - Lutte Ouvrière
  - Movement of Progressives
  - New Anticapitalist Party
  - Revolutionary Left
