= Place du Colonel Fabien =

Square in Paris, France

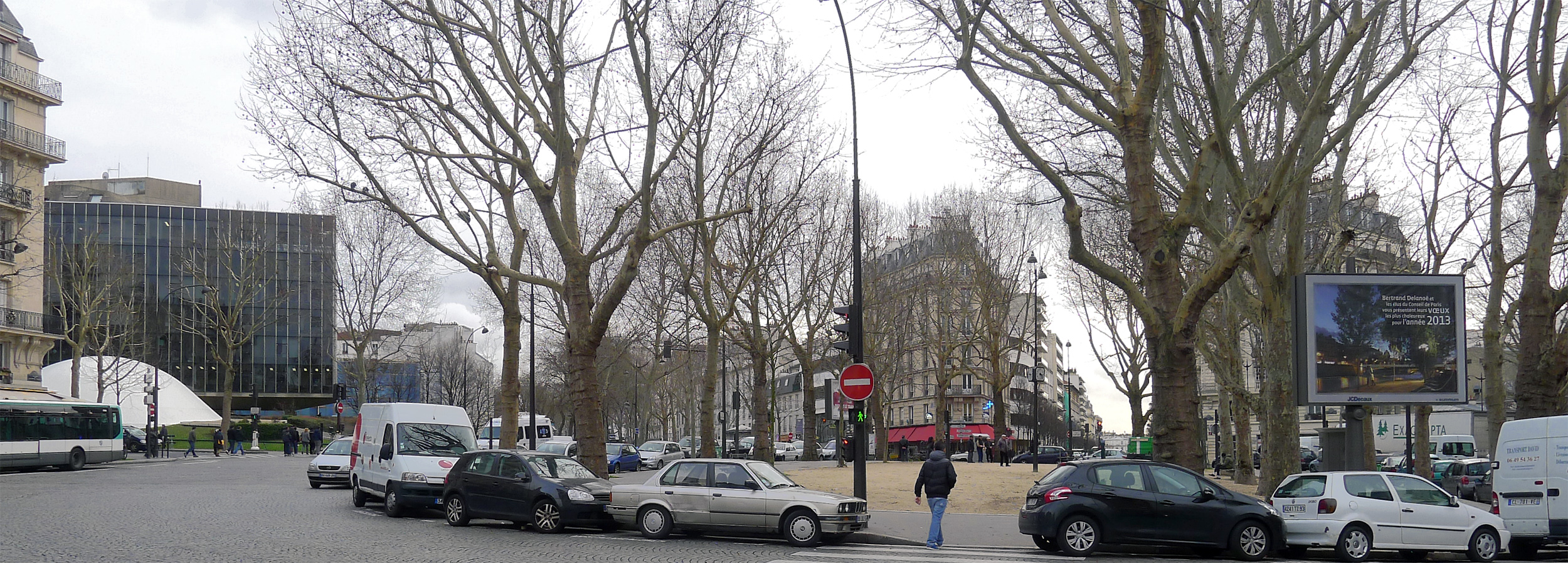
- Place du Colonel Fabien

- Location within Paris
- Namesake: Pierre Georges
- Arrondissement: 10th, 19th
- Quarter: Hôpital Saint-Louis. Villette. Combat.
- Coordinates: 48°52′41″N 2°22′13″E

Construction
- Completion: January 16, 1789
- Denomination: July 7, 1945

The Place du Colonel Fabien (English: Colonel Fabien Square) is a square in Paris straddling the 10th and 19th arrondissements. Before the liberation of Paris, the square was called the Place du Combat ('Combat Square'), but it was renamed in honour of the French communist resistance hero Pierre Georges, whose nom de guerre was Colonel Fabien.

The headquarters of the French Communist Party, designed by the Brazilian communist and utilitarian architect Oscar Niemeyer, is located here, as is a station of the Paris Métro. Nearby is the former location of the medieval Gibbet of Montfaucon, a multi-tiered gibbet that was for most of its history outside the city walls of Paris.
