= French Communist Party =

French Communist Party Parti communiste français
- Abbreviation: PCF
- National Secretary: Fabien Roussel
- Spokespersons: Cécile Cukierman; Ian Brossat
- Founders: Ludovic-Oscar Frossard; Fernand Loriot; Boris Souvarine; Marcel Cachin; Ho Chi Minh
- Founded: 30 December 1920; 105 years ago
- Split from: French Section of the Workers' International
- Headquarters: Headquarters of the French Communist Party, 2, place du Colonel Fabien – 75019 Paris
- Newspaper: L'Humanité
- Student wing: Union of Communist Students
- Youth wing: Mouvement Jeunes Communistes de France
- Overseas wing: Secteur international du PCF
- Membership (2023): ▼42,237
- Ideology: Communism; Soft Euroscepticism; Historical: Marxism–Leninism (Until 1979); Eurocommunism (From 1970s)
- Political position: Left-wing to far-left Historical: Far-left
- National affiliation: New Popular Front (since 2024); NUPES (2022–2024); Left Front (2008–2018)
- Regional affiliation: PSOM (historical)
- European affiliation: Party of the European Left
- International affiliation: IMCWP; Cominform (1947–1956); Comintern (1920–1943)
- Colors: Red
- Anthem: "The Internationale"
- National Assembly: 8 / 577
- Senate: 14 / 348
- European Parliament: 0 / 81
- Presidency of Regional Councils: 0 / 17
- Presidency of Departmental Councils: 0 / 95

Website
- pcf.fr
- Politics of France; Political parties; Elections; Until 2008, the party was also member of Popular Front (1936–1938), CNFL (1940–1947) and the Plural Left (1997–2002)

The French Communist Party (French: Parti communiste français, pronounced [paʁti kɔmynist fʁɑ̃sɛ], PCF) is a communist party in France. The PCF is a member of the Party of the European Left.

The PCF was founded in 1920 by Leninist members of the French Section of the Workers' International (SFIO) who supported the Bolsheviks in the 1917 Russian Revolution. It became a member of the Communist International, and followed a Marxist-Leninist line under the leadership of Maurice Thorez. In response to the threat of fascism, the PCF joined the socialist Popular Front which won the 1936 election, but it did not participate in government. During World War II, it was outlawed by the occupying Germans and became a key element of the Resistance. The PCF participated in the provisional government of the Liberation from 1944 to 1947, but for the next 30 years was excluded from government despite consistently winning more than 20 percent of the vote in elections. It fell behind the Socialist Party in the 1970s, though entered government early in François Mitterrand's presidency (1981–1984) and participated in the Plural Left cabinet led by Lionel Jospin (1997–2002).

From 2009, the PCF was a leading member of the Left Front (Front de gauche), alongside Jean-Luc Mélenchon's Left Party (PG). During the 2017 presidential election, the PCF supported Mélenchon's candidature; however, tensions between the PCF and Mélenchon's movement, La France Insoumise, have led the two parties to campaign separately for the general elections. Although its electoral support has declined in recent decades, the PCF retains a strong influence in French politics, especially at the local level. In 2012, the PCF claimed to have had 138,000 members, 70,000 of whom had paid their membership fees.

== History ==
The French Communist Party (PCF) originated in 1920, when a majority of members resigned from the socialist French Section of the Workers' International (SFIO) party to set up the French Section of the Communist International (SFIC) with Ludovic-Oscar Frossard as its first secretary-general, with the involvement of Ho Chi Minh as one of the notable agitators participating in its creation. The new SFIC defined itself as revolutionary and democratic centralist. The 1920s saw a number of splits within the party over relations with other left-wing parties and over adherence to Comintern's dictates. The party entered the French parliament, but also promoted strike action and opposed colonialism, a position that was isolated in the French political landscape at the time. The Intercolonial Union, created in 1922, brought together activists from the French colonies around demands for political equality (the right to vote) and social equality ("equal pay for equal work"). The communists thus called for fraternization with the Moroccan insurgents during the Rif War (1925–1926) and to the evacuation of Morocco by the French army, they called for an end to the fighting and the independence of French Syria during the Great Syrian Revolt of 1925–1927, and denounced the festivities of the centenary of the colonization of Algeria, organizing in particular a campaign to boycott the Paris Colonial Exposition (1931).

The party was organized around leaders who were mostly from the working class, setting up training and promotion schemes and encouraging the presentation of working-class candidates in elections. The Maurice Thorez, Jacques Duclos and Benoît Frachon team, who had been miners, metalworkers and pastry cooks respectively, had an exceptional longevity and led the French party for almost three decades. The railroad worker Pierre Semard had been secretary general of the party from 1924 to 1929.

Semard sought party unity and alliances with other parties; but leaders including Thorez (party leader from 1930 to 1964) imposed a Marxist-Leninist line from the late 1920s. With the rise of fascism after 1934 the PCF supported the Popular Front, which came to power under Léon Blum in 1936. The party supported the Second Spanish Republic and opposed the 1938 Munich Agreement with Hitler. It was the only political party in France to denounce this agreement.

The party was banned in 1939 by the government of Édouard Daladier as a result of the German–Soviet Non-aggression Pact, due to its membership in the Comintern, which opposed the War (prior to the invasion of the Soviet Union by Nazi Germany). The leadership, threatened with execution, fled abroad. After the German invasion of 1940 the party began to organise opposition to the occupation. Shortly before Germany invaded the Soviet Union the next year, the PCF formed, in May 1941, the National Front movement within the broader Resistance, together with the armed Francs-Tireurs et Partisans (FTP) group. At the same time the PCF began to work with de Gaulle's "Free France" government in exile, and later took part in the National Council of the Resistance (CNR).

By the time the German occupation ended in 1944, the party had become a powerful force in many parts of France. It was among the leading parties in elections in 1945 and 1946, and entered into the governing Tripartite alliance, which pursued social reforms and statism. However, amid concerns within France and abroad over the extent of communist influence, the PCF was excluded from government in May 1947. Under pressure from Moscow, the PCF thereafter distanced itself from other parties and focused on agitation within its trade union base. For the rest of the Fourth Republic period, the PCF, led by Maurice Thorez and Jacques Duclos, remained politically isolated, still taking a Marxist-Leninist line, though retaining substantial electoral support.

Although the PCF opposed de Gaulle's formation of the Fifth Republic in 1958, the following years saw a rapprochement with other left-wing forces and an increased strength in parliament.

By the middle of the 1960s, the PCF lost members and sympathizers due to its ambivalent positions during the Algerian war and its perceived excessive focus on class and inadequate focus on imperialism and race.

With Waldeck Rochet as its new secretary-general, the party supported François Mitterrand's unsuccessful presidential bid in 1965. During the student riots and strikes of May 1968, the party supported the strikes while denouncing the revolutionary student movements. After heavy losses in the ensuing parliamentary elections, the party adopted Georges Marchais as leader and in 1973 entered into a "Common Programme" alliance with Mitterrand's reconstituted Socialist Party (PS). It provided for an increase in wages and social benefits, a reduction in working hours, a retirement age of 60 for men and 55 for women, the expansion of workers' rights and freedoms, the abolition of the death penalty and nuclear disarmament. In 1979 it was proposed by revisionists in France that party documents should omit Marxism–Leninism and use scientific socialism in its place. Under the Common Programme, however, the PCF steadily lost ground to the PS, a process that continued after Mitterrand's victory in 1981.

Initially allotted a minor share in Mitterrand's government, the PCF resigned in 1984 as the government turned towards fiscal orthodoxy. Under Marchais the party largely maintained its traditional communist doctrines and structure. Extensive reform was undertaken after 1994, when Robert Hue became leader. This did little to stem the party's declining popularity, although it entered government again in 1997 as part of the Plural Left coalition. Elections in 2002 gave worse results than ever for the PCF. Under Marie-George Buffet, the PCF turned away from parliamentary strategy and sought broader social alliances. To maintain a presence in parliament after 2007 the party's few remaining deputies had to join others in the Democratic and Republican Left group. Subsequently, a broader electoral coalition, the Left Front (FG), was formed including the PCF, the Left Party (PG), Unitary Left, and others. The FG has brought the French communists somewhat better electoral results. Pierre Laurent was leader from 2010 to 2018, being succeeded by Fabien Roussel who stood as the party's candidate at the 2022 French presidential election. Roussel received 2.28% of votes cast, coming in eighth place.

== Ideology ==
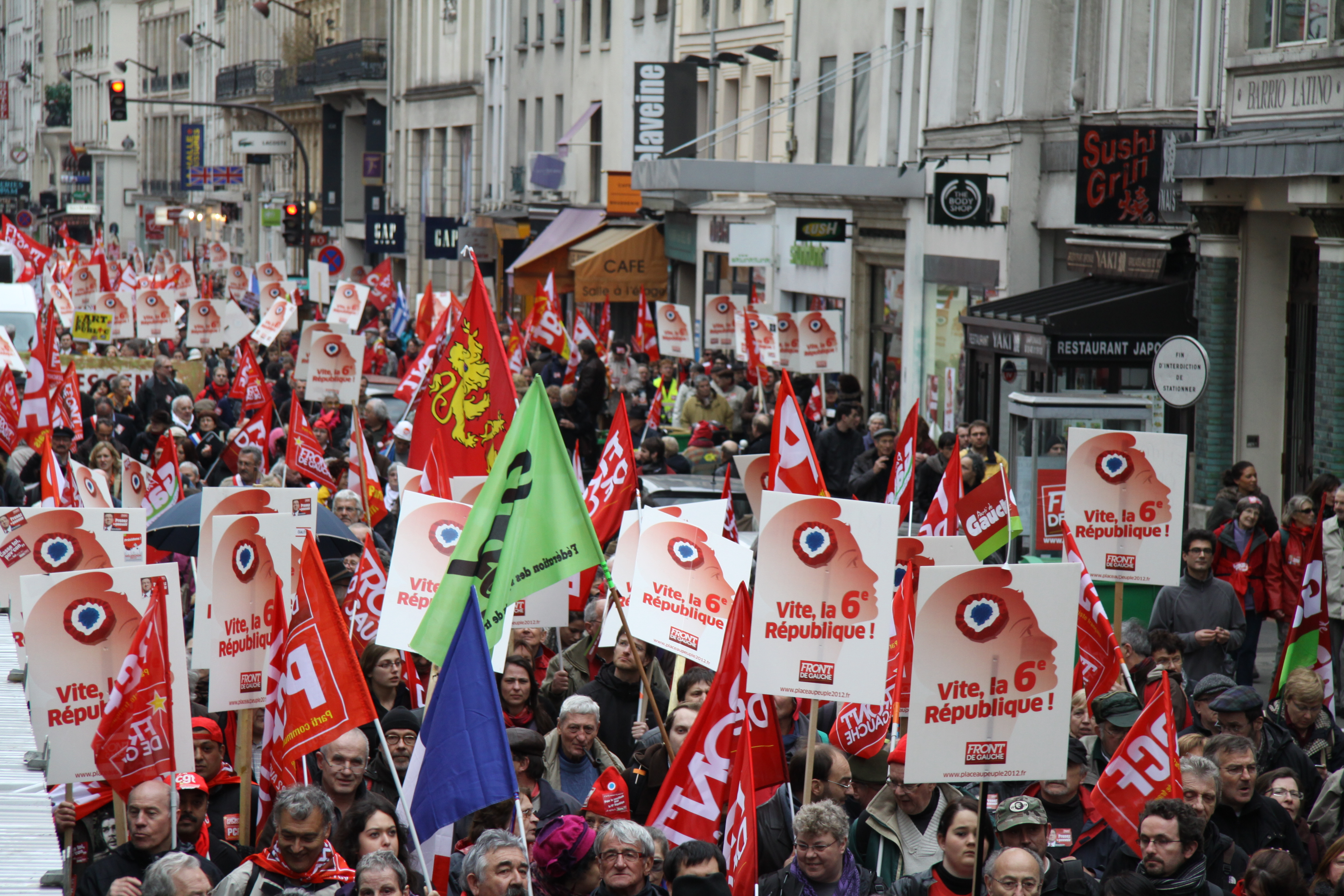
PCF rallying for a Sixth Republic, 2012 in Paris

The PCF, in contrast to weaker and more marginal communist parties in Europe, is usually seen as a left wing, rather than far-left, party in the French context. While the French far-left (LCR/NPA, LO) has refused to participate in government or engage in electoral alliances with centre-left parties such as the PS, the PCF has participated in governments in the past, and still enjoys a de facto electoral agreement with the PS (mutual withdrawals, the common practice since 1962 and in 1934–1939). Nonetheless, some observers and analysts classify the PCF as a far-left party, noting their political proximity to other far-left parties.

During the Sino-Soviet split, the PCF aligned with the Soviet perspective.

In the 1980s, under Georges Marchais, the PCF mixed a partial acceptance of "bourgeois" democracy and individual liberties with more traditional Marxist–Leninist ideas. During this same period the PCF was run on democratic centralist lines and structured itself as a revolutionary party in the Leninist sense and rejected criticism of the Soviet Union. Under Robert Hue's leadership after 1994, the PCF's ideology and internal organization underwent major changes. Hue clearly rejected the Soviet model, and reserved very harsh criticism for Soviet leaders who had "rejected, for years, human rights and 'bourgeois' democracy" and had oppressed individual liberties and aspirations. Today, the PCF considers the Soviet Union as a 'perversion' of the communist model and unambiguously rejects Stalinism. It has not attributed the failure of the Soviet Union as being that of communism, rather stating that the failure of Soviet socialism was the failure of one model "among others", including the capitalist or social democratic models. It also tried to downplay the PCF's historic attachment to Moscow and the Soviet Union.

Since then, the PCF's ideology has been marked by significant ideological evolution on some topics, but consistency on other issues. Some of the most marked changes have come on individual rights and immigration. After having vilified homosexuality and feminism as "the rubbish of capitalism" in the 1970s, the PCF now supports gay rights and feminism. In the 1980s, the PCF supported reducing the age of consent for homosexual relationships, and opposed attempts to re-penalize homosexuality. In 1998, the PCF voted in favour of the civil solidarity pact (PACS), civil unions, including for homosexual couples. The PCF supports both same-sex marriage and same-sex adoption. On 12 February 2013, PCF deputies voted in favour of same-sex marriage and adoption rights in the National Assembly, though PCF deputy Patrice Carvalho voted against. The PCF also supports feminist movements, and supports policies to further promote gender equality and parity.

Despite its moral conservatism in the 1930s and 1960s, in 1946, it elected seventeen of the first thirty-three women deputies. In 1956, there were only nineteen women in the National Assembly, but fifteen were Communists.

On the issue of immigration, the PCF's positions have also evolved significantly since the 1980s. In the 1981 presidential election, Georges Marchais ran a controversial campaign on immigration which was harshly criticized by anti-racism organizations at the time. In 1980, the PCF's leadership voted in favour of limiting immigration. The same year, Marchais supported the PCF mayor of Vitry-sur-Seine who had destroyed a home for Malian migrant workers; the PCF claimed that the right-wing government was trying to push immigrants into ghettos in Communist working-class cities. The Libération newspaper also alleged that PCF municipal administrations had been working to limit the number of immigrants in housing projects. However, today the PCF supports the regularization of illegal immigrants.

One historical consistency in the PCF's ideology has been its staunch opposition to capitalism, which must be "overcome" because according to the PCF the capitalist system is "exhausted" and "on the verge of collapse". The PCF has interpreted the current course of globalization as a confirmation of Karl Marx and Friedrich Engels's view on the future evolution of capitalism. The party position is that the 2008 financial crisis and the Great Recession have further justified its calls to overcome capitalism. However, the PCF has remained somewhat vague on how capitalism will be 'overcome' and what will replace it, placing heavy emphasis on utopic models or values.

The text adopted at the XXXVI Congress in February 2013 reiterated the party's call on the need to "overcome" capitalism, fiercely denounced by the PCF as having led to "savage competition", "the devastation of the planet" and "barbarism". It contrasts its vision of capitalism with its proposed alternative, described as an egalitarian, humanist, and democratic alternative. It emphasizes human emancipation, the development of "each and every one", the right to happiness and the equal dignity of each human being regardless of gender, race or sexual orientation. The party further posits that such an egalitarian society is impossible within capitalism, which "unleashes domination and hatred".

The party is generally seen as Eurosceptic.

For the 2022 French legislative election, the party joined the New Ecologic and Social People's Union (NUPES) bloc of left-wing and green parties. In the alliance, they were the only party to support nuclear energy.

=== 2012 platform ===
Jean-Luc Mélenchon and the FG's platform in the 2012 presidential election was broken up into nine overarching themes.

- "Sharing the wealth and abolishing social insecurity" – banning market-based layoffs (licenciements boursiers) for companies which make profits, raise the minimum wage (SMIC) to €1,700, setting a maximum wage differential of 1 to 20 in all businesses, right to retirement with a full pension at 60, defending public services, stopping public sector spending cuts (RGPP), setting a maximum wage at €360,000 and a 35-hour workweek.
- "Reclaiming power from banks and financial markets" – changing the European Central Bank's policy to favour job creation and public services, controlling financial speculation, raising the capital gains tax and the solidarity tax on wealth (ISF), abolishing fiscal loopholes and privileges, taxing corporations' financial revenues and creating a "public financial pole" to reorient credit towards jobs, innovation and sustainable development.
- "Ecological planning" – nationalizing Électricité de France, Gaz de France and Areva to create a publicly owned energy sector, creating a national public water service, a new transportation policy promoting public transportation and taxing the transportation of non-vital merchandise.
- "Producing differently" – a new model of development and economic growth which respects the environment and individuals, redefining industrial priorities, new rights for employees and creating a gross national happiness indicator.
- "The Republic, for real" – reaffirming the 1905 French law on the Separation of the Churches and the State, creating a ministry for women and equality, repealing the HADOPI law, regularizing illegal immigrants, opposition to the golden rule of fiscal balance and creating jobs in the public sector.
- "Convene a constituent assembly for the Sixth Republic" – convening a constituent assembly, repealing the 2010 local and regional government reform, proportional representation in all elections, reducing presidential powers and strengthening parliamentary powers, and guaranteeing judicial and press freedom.
- "Repealing the Lisbon Treaty and creating another Europe" – repealing the Treaty of Lisbon, opposition to the European Fiscal Compact, proposing and adopting a new European treaty which would "prioritize social progress and democracy" and reforming the statutes of the European Central Bank.
- "To change the course of globalization" – withdrawing French troops from the war in Afghanistan, French withdrawal from NATO, recognizing the independence of a Palestinian state within 1967 borders, creation of a Tobin tax to finance international development and cooperation, debt forgiveness for low-income countries.
- "Prioritizing human emancipation" – creating jobs in public education, spending 1% of GDP on arts and culture, and doubling investment in research.

The platform also supported same-sex marriage, same-sex adoption, voting rights for resident foreigners, euthanasia, and constitutional recognition of abortion.

=== French nationalism ===
The French Communist Party inherited from the Jacobins the concept of France as a centralised, French-speaking, unitary state, with a unitary culture and it is opposed to the separatism and regional identity of other European minority groups native to the area of what consists the French Republic. For instance in 1984, the Soviet ethnographer Solomon Bruk (who had worked under Sergey Tolstov) published a study on France and mentioned the existence of other ethnic groups in the state such as Bretons, Corsicans, Alsatians, Basques, Catalans, Flemish and others. In response to this work, General Secretary Georges Marchais wrote a letter of protest in February 1984, complaining bitterly to the Secretariat of the Communist Party of the Soviet Union.

France is one country, one nation, one people. We protest indignantly against such ridiculous and odious allegations. For us, as for all the citizens of our country, every man and woman of French nationality is French. Every attempt using hazardous criteria which borders on racism in an ill-defined way, seeking to define as not purely French such and such members of the French community, is offensive to the national consciousness. Nobody here can accept that, our Party least of all.

— George Marchais, Letter to the Secretariat of the Communist Party of the USSR, February 1984.

== Elected officials ==
- Deputies: Elsa Faucillon, Soumya Bourouaha, André Chassaigne, Stephane Little, Jean-Paul Lecoq, Édouard Bénard
- Senators: Peter Lawrence, Pierre Ouzoulias, Christine Prunaud, Michelle Greaume, Éric Bocquet, Celine Brulin, Fabien Gay, Cathy Apourceau-Poly, Éliane Assassi, Laurence Cohen, Cécile Cukierman, Pascal Savoldelli

The PCF does not, as of May 2022, have any MEPs. It has two Presidents of the General Council – in the Val-de-Marne and Allier. The PCF lost Seine-Saint-Denis, which it had held since the 1960s, to the PS in 2008.

== Internal organization ==
The PCF has traditionally been a "mass party", although Maurice Duverger had differentiated it from other mass parties because the PCF kept a tight control over membership and regularly expelled unsuitable members. In its heyday, the PCF maintained a large base of members and the party's political and electoral actions were supported in society by a trade union, the General Confederation of Labour (CGT); a newspaper, L'Humanité; and a large number of front organizations or associations in civil society which organized a large number of political or non-political social activities for PCF members. One such activity which still exists today is the annual Fête de l'Humanité organized by the L'Humanité. French and foreign left-wing parties, organizations or movements are represented and the activities feature musical performances.

Since the PCF's decline began in the 1970s, however, it has seen its membership base slowly dry up and its allied organizations disappear or distance themselves from the party. The PCF claimed 520,000 members in 1978; 330,000 in 1987; 270,000 in 1996; and 133,000 in 2002. In 2008, the party claimed that it had 134,000 members of which 79,000 were up to date on their membership fees. In the 2011 internal primary, 69,277 members were registered to vote and 48,631 (70.2%) did so. The party likely has about 70,000 members as of today, but only about 40 to 50 thousand seem to actively participate in the party's organization and political activities.

According to studies by the CEVIPOF in 1979 and 1997, the makeup of the PCF's membership has also changed significantly since 1979. The most marked change was a major decline in the share of manual workers (ouvriers) in the party's membership, with a larger number of employees and middle-classes, especially those who work in the public sector. The form of political action taken by members has also changed, with less emphasis on direct political or electoral action but a greater emphasis on social work and protests.

The party's structures were democratized at the 1994 Congress, dropping democratic centralism and allowing for the public expression of disapproval or dissent with the party line or leadership. The party's top posts, like that of 'secretary-general', were renamed (secretary-general became national-secretary). The party, since 2000, is now led by a national council, which serves as the leadership between congresses; and the executive committee, which is charged with applying the national council's decisions. The national-secretary is elected by delegates at the congress. Likewise, the national council is elected by list voting at every congress. A reform of statutes in 2001 has allowed "alternative texts" – dissent from the text proposed by the PCF leadership – to be presented and voted on; dissident lists to those backed by the leadership may also run for the national council.

The General Confederation of Labour (CGT) was dominated by the PCF after 1946, with almost all its leaders between 1947 and 1996 (Benoît Frachon, Georges Séguy, Henri Krasucki, Louis Viannet) also serving in the PCF's national leadership structures. For years, the CGT and the PCF were close and almost indissociable allies – notably in May 1968 when both the CGT and PCF were eager for a restoration of social order and welcomed the Grenelle agreements. While the CGT has remained the largest trade union in France, it has taken its independence vis-à-vis the PCF. Louis Viannet spectacularly quit the national bureau of the PCF in 1996 and Bernard Thibault, the CGT's leader between 1999 and 2013, left the PCF's national council in 2001.

L'Humanité has retained closer ties with the PCF. The newspaper was founded by Jean Jaurès in 1904 as the socialist movement's mouthpiece, and it followed the communist majority following the split in 1920. After having been the official newspaper of the PCF, with a readership of up to 100,000 in 1945, the newspaper's readership and sales declined substantially partly due to the PCF's concomitant decline. In 1999, the mention of the newspaper's link to the PCF was dropped and the PCF no longer determines its editorial stance. It sold an average of 46,929 newspapers per day in 2012; down from 53,530 in 2007.

=== Leadership ===
Secretaries-general (1921–1994) and national-secretaries (since 1994)

- Ludovic-Oscar Frossard: 4 January 1921 – 1 January 1923
- Louis Sellier and Albert Treint, interim secretaries-general: 21 January 1923 – 23 January 1924
- Louis Sellier: 23 January 1924 – 1 July 1924
- Pierre Semard: 8 July 1924 – 8 April 1929
- Collective secretariat (Henri Barbé, Pierre Celor, Benoît Frachon, Maurice Thorez): 8 April 1929 – 18 July 1930
- Maurice Thorez: 18 July 1930 – 17 May 1964 (president between 17 May and his death on 11 July 1964)
  - Jacques Duclos, interim secretary-general: 17 June 1950 – 10 April 1953
- Waldeck Rochet: 17 May 1964 – 17 December 1972 (deputy secretary-general from 14 May 1961 to 17 May 1964)
  - Georges Marchais, interim secretary-general later deputy secretary-general from June 1969 to 17 December 1972
- Georges Marchais: 17 December 1972 – 29 January 1994
- Robert Hue: 29 January 1994 – 28 October 2001 (president between 28 October 2001 and 8 April 2003)
- Marie-George Buffet: 28 October 2001 – 20 June 2010
- Pierre Laurent: 20 June 2010 – 24 November 2018
- Fabien Roussel: since 24 November 2018

=== Factions ===
There are no formal organized factions or political groupings within the PCF. This was originally due to the practice of democratic centralism, but even after the democratization of the PCF structure after 1994 the ban on the organization of formal factions within the party remained. According to party statutes, the PCF supports the "pluralism of ideas" but the right to pluralism "may not be translated into an organizations of tendencies". Nevertheless, certain factions and groups are easily identifiable within the PCF and they are de facto expressed officially by different orientation texts or lists for leadership elections at party congresses.

- Majority: the current leadership of the PCF since 2003 is around Marie-George Buffet and Pierre Laurent and supports the continued existence of the PCF, but with the need for internal transformations. Vis-à-vis the PS, the PCF leadership has taken a more autonomous stance but it still sees the PS as a potential electoral partner (in runoff elections or in local elections) and even as a potential governing partner. The leadership has been generally strongly supportive of the Left Front alliance with other parties, which it sees as a "new Popular Front" as a culmination of its attempts, undertaken since 2003, to broaden the PCF's base to social movements, associations, unions and other left-wing or far-left parties.
- Orthodox: the heterogeneous faction of PCF "orthodox" refers to those traditionalist members who opposed the mutation of the 1990s and wish to return to Marxist–Leninist fundamentals. The orthodox faction opposes electoral alliances or governing coalitions with the PS, and it has also proven fairly lukewarm to the Left Front and has often been critical of Jean-Luc Mélenchon's influence over the FG and his 2012 candidacy. Unlike the majority which supports European integration under the form "social Europe" or "another Europe", the orthodox wish to withdraw from the European Union and the Eurozone. Prominent orthodox factions and leaders include Jean-Jacques Karman's Communist Left, Emmanuel Dang Tran's PCF section in the 15th arrondissement of Paris, André Gerin, Alain Bocquet, and Patrice Carvalho. The PCF orthodox factions has strong support in the old PCF federations in northern France (Nord-Pas-de-Calais, Somme, Seine-Maritime) or other federations such as the Meurthe-et-Moselle, the Haute-Saône, Aisne and Tarn.

Some orthodox communists have chosen to leave the PCF. In 2004, the FNARC group around Georges Hage founded the small Pole of Communist Revival in France (PRCF). Maxime Gremetz was sidelined from the PCF in 2006, after major disagreements with the leadership, and has since founded a small political movement (Anger and Hope, Colère et espoir) active only in his native Picardy. A group of hardline orthodox around former PCF senator Rolande Perlican founded the Communistes party.

- Novateurs, also known as conservatives: a small faction led by supporters of Georges Marchais' old political line (i.e. traditional Marxism adapted to modern circumstances) as developed by PCF economist and historian Paul Boccara, who developed the idea of state monopoly capitalism. Leaders of the faction include Nicolas Marchand and Yves Dimicoli.
- La Riposte: a political association within the PCF which was the French section of the International Marxist Tendency, a Trotskyist entryist organization, until 2014. They are ideologically close to the orthodox faction on rejecting alliances with the PS or a return to Marxist fundamentals but they differ significantly from the orthodox faction in their severe condemnations of Stalinism and the later Soviet Union. They also support the Left Front.
- Huistes: the allies of former secretary-general Robert Hue (1994–2001) have mostly left the PCF. Hue's leadership was marked by internal democratizations as part of his mutation, but also close cooperation and alliances with the PS. The Huistes tend to be the most supportive of electoral and government alliances with the PS. Hue remains, technically, a member of the PCF; but he has broken with the current leadership. As a senator, he sits in the European Democratic and Social Rally (RDSE) and leads a small political movement, the Progressive Unitary Movement (MUP) which has one deputy elected in 2012 with PS support and who sits with the Radical Party of the Left (PRG) group in the National Assembly. The MUP supports the creation of a broad alliance with the PS, the Greens (EELV), the PRG and even some centrists. Besides Hue, some of prominent followers include Jean-Claude Gayssot, Jack Ralite or Ivan Renar.
- Refondateurs/Rénovateurs: the reformist faction of the PCF, known either as refondateurs or rénovateurs, has mostly left the PCF today, but they played an important role in the PCF's internal politics for decades and they continue to be closely associated to the PCF through the Left Front. The reformist faction, ideologically aligned with the New Left, Eurocommunism, ecosocialism, feminism and democratic socialism, has long been at odds with the PCF's leadership. Under Marchais, they opposed the traditionalist Marxist and pro-Soviet direction of the party and chafed at the party's democratic centralism.

Many dissident Communist reformists supported Pierre Juquin's candidacy in the 1988 presidential election, alongside 'red-green' ecosocialists, the remnants of the Unified Socialist Party (PSU) and the LCR. PCF dissidents who had backed Juquin's candidacy, including former cabinet ministers Marcel Rigout and Charles Fiterman participated in the foundation of the Convention for a Progressive Alternative (CAP) in 1994, which has since obtained limited support only in a few departments. Jean-Pierre Brard, the CAP's sole parliamentarian until his defeat in 2012, sat with the PCF in the National Assembly.
Reformists who remained within the PCF, such as Patrick Braouezec, François Asensi and Jacqueline Fraysse, opposed Hue and Buffet's leadership: they did not support the PCF's presidential candidates in 2002 and 2007, and they clamored for the re-foundation of the PCF as part of a broader left-wing movements including left-wing Greens, ecosocialists, the far-left, social movements and left-wing associations. Despite the creation of the Left Front, the reformists led by Braouezec left the PCF in 2010 and joined the small Federation for a Social and Ecological Alternative (FASE) which is now a component of the Left Front.

==== Factional strength ====
Preparatory votes on orientation texts for PCF Congresses since 2003:

Faction	XXXII (2003)	XXXIII (2006)	XXXIV (2008)	XXXVI (2013)	XXXVII (2016)
Majority	55.02%	63.38%	60.9%	73.16%	51,20%
Orthodox	23.60%	13.25% (Note: André Gerin, Communist Left); 8.22% (Note: Paris' 15th arrondissement); 3.71% (Note: Maxime Gremetz, Colère et espoir)	24.02%	10.99% 5.81% (Note: Paris' 15th arrondissement – Emmanuel Dang Tran)	23,68% 12,87% 6,86%
Novateurs	21.38%	11.44%	–	–	–
La Riposte	–	–	15.05%	10.05%	5,40%

At the XXXIV Congress in 2008, for the election of the national council, the majority's list won 67.73% from the congress' delegates against 16.38% for Marie-Pierre Vieu's huiste list backed by the refondateurs, 10.26% for André Gerin's orthodox list and 5.64% for Nicolas Marchand's novateur list.

== Popular support and electoral record ==
Currently, the PCF retains some strength in suburban Paris, in the Nord section of the old coal mining area in the Nord-Pas-de-Calais, the industrial harbours of Le Havre and Dieppe, in some departments of central France, such as Allier and Cher (where a form of sharecropping existed, in addition to mining and small industrial-mining centres such as Commentry and Montceau-les-Mines), the industrial mining region of northern Meurthe-et-Moselle (Longwy) and in some cities of the south, such as the industrial areas of Marseille and nearby towns, as well as the working-class suburbs surrounding Paris (the ceinture rouge), Lyon, Saint-Étienne, Alès and Grenoble. The PCF is also strong in the Cévennes mountains, a left-wing rural anti-clerical stronghold with a strong Huguenot minority.

Communist traditions in the "Red Limousin", the Pas-de-Calais, Paris proper, Nièvre, Finistère, Alpes-Maritimes and Var have been hurt significantly by demographic changes (Var, Alpes-Maritimes, Finistère), a loss of voters to the Socialist Party due to good local Socialist infrastructure or strongmen (Nièvre, Pas-de-Calais, Paris) or due to the emergence of rival parties on the radical left (the Convention for a Progressive Alternative, a party of reformist communists, in the Limousin and Val-de-Marne).

There exist isolated Communist bases in the rural anti-clerical areas of southwestern Côtes-d'Armor and northwestern Morbihan; in the industrial areas of Le Mans; in the shipbuilding cities of Saint-Nazaire, La Seyne-sur-Mer (there are no more ships built in La Seyne); and in isolated industrial centres built along the old Paris-Lyon railway (the urban core of Romilly-sur-Seine, Aube has elected a Communist general councillor since 1958).

During the course of the 20th century, the French communists were considered to be pioneers in local government, providing not only efficient street lighting and clean streets, but also public entertainment, public housing, municipal swimming pools, day nurseries, children's playgrounds, and public lavatories. In 1976, for instance, the communist mayor of Sarcelles, Henry Canacos, was named "best mayor in the Paris region" by Vie Publique (a trade periodical for urban planners and administrators) for enriching Sarcelles' public spaces with new restaurants, movie theatres, cafes, more parks, a large shopping mall, and better transportation. Education also became, in the words of one text, an "identifiable characteristic of Communist government at the local level". A study of municipal budgets that was completed in 1975 (but using data from 1968) found that while Communist local government spent 34% less than non-Communist Left governments and 36% less than moderate-Right governments for maintenance, it nevertheless spent 49% more than moderate Right governments and 36% more than non-Communist Left governments for education and educational support.

=== Presidential ===
Election year	Candidate	1st round			2nd round			Result
Election year	Candidate	Votes	%	Rank	Votes	%	Rank	Result
1969	Jacques Duclos	4,808,285	21.27	▲3rd	—N/a			Lost
1974	endorsed Mitterrand (PS)							
1981	Georges Marchais	4,456,922	15.35	▼4th	—N/a			Lost
1988	André Lajoinie	2,056,261	6.76	▼5th	—N/a			Lost
1995	Robert Hue	2,638,936	8.66	5th	—N/a			Lost
2002	Robert Hue	960,480	3.37	▼11th	—N/a			Lost
2007	Marie-George Buffet	707,268	1.93	▲7th	—N/a			Lost
2012 (Note: Supported Jean-Luc Mélenchon as candidate for the Left Front.)	Jean-Luc Mélenchon	3,984,822	11.10	▲4th	—N/a			Lost
2017	endorsed Mélenchon (LFI)							
2022	Fabien Roussel	802,422	2.28	▼8th	—N/a			Lost

=== Legislative ===
National Assembly
Election	Votes (first round)		Seats	
Election	#	%	#	±
1924	885,993	9.8	26 / 581	Steady
1928	1,066,099	11.3	11 / 604	▼15
1932	796,630	8.3	10 / 607	▼1
1936	1,502,404	15.3	72 / 610	▲62
1945	5,024,174	26.2	159 / 586	▲87
1946 (Jun)	5,145,325	26.0	153 / 586	▼6
1946 (Nov)	5,430,593	28.3	182 / 627	▲29
1951	4,939,380	26.3	103 / 625	▼79
1956	5,514,403	23.6	150 / 595	▲47
1958	3,882,204	18.9	10 / 546	▼140
1962	4,003,553	20.8	41 / 465	▲31
1967	5,039,032	22.5	73 / 487	▲32
1968	4,434,832	20.0	34 / 487	▼39
1973	5,085,108	21.4	73 / 488	▲39
1978	5,870,402	20.6	86 / 488	▲13
1981	4,065,540	16.2	44 / 491	▼42
1986	2,739,225	9.8	35 / 573	▼9
1988	2,765,761	11.3	27 / 575	▼8
1993	2,331,339	9.3	24 / 577	▼3
1997	2,523,405	9.9	35 / 577	▲11
2002	1,216,178	4.8	21 / 577	▼14
2007	1,115,663	4.3	15 / 577	▼6
2012	1,792,923	6.9	7 / 577	▼8
2017	615,487	2.7	10 / 577	▲3
2022	607,667	2.9	12 / 577	▲2
2024	740,940	2.3	8 / 577	▼4

=== European Parliament ===
European Parliament
Election	Leader	Votes	%	Seats	+/−	EP Group
1979	Georges Marchais	4,153,710	20.52 (#3)	19 / 81	New	COM
1984	Georges Marchais	2,261,312	11.21 (#3)	10 / 81	▼9	COM
1989	Philippe Herzog	1,401,171	7.72 (#6)	7 / 81	▼3	EUL
1994	Francis Wurtz	1,342,222	6.89 (#6)	7 / 87	0	EUL
1999	Robert Hue	1,196,310	6.78 (#6)	6 / 87	▼1	GUE/NGL
2004 (Note: Run in a joint list with AOM, that won 3 seats in total.)	Marie-George Buffet	1,009,976	5.88 (#7)	2 / 74	▼4	GUE/NGL
2009 (Note: Run in a joint list with PG, GU and AOM, that won 5 seats in total.)	Marie-George Buffet	1,115,021	6.48 (#5)	3 / 72	▲1	GUE/NGL
2014 (Note: Run in a joint list with PG, GU and AOM, that won 4 seats in total.)	Jean-Luc Mélenchon	1,252,730	6.61 (#6)	1 / 74	▼2	GUE/NGL
2019 (Note: Run in a joint list with R&S, PCR and PCM, that won no seats.)	Ian Brossat	564,949	2.49 (#10)	0 / 79	▼1	−
2024 (Note: Run in a joint list with FGR, PCR, PCM and HeD, that won no seats.)	Léon Deffontaines	584,020	2.36 (#8)	0 / 81	0	−

== Publications ==
The PCF publishes the following:

- Communistes (Communists)
- Info Hebdo (Weekly News)
- Economie et Politique (Economics and Politics)

Traditionally, it was also the owner of the French daily L'Humanité (Humanity), founded by Jean Jaurès. Although the newspaper is now independent, it remains close to the PCF. The paper is sustained by the annual Fête de L'Humanité festival, held in La Courneuve, a working class suburb of Paris. This event remains the biggest festival in France, with 600,000 attendees during a three-day period.

During the 1970s, the PCF registered success with the children's magazine it founded, Pif gadget.

== See also ==
- Communism in France
- List of foreign delegations at 24th PCF Congress (1982)
- Place du Colonel Fabien
- Reading Capital, by Louis Althusser, 1965
- MRAP, anti-racist NGO, created in 1941
- Roger Roche, founder of a cell of the French Communist Party in Rufisque in 1925
- French branch of the Armenian Relief Committee
