= New Anticapitalist Party =

Far-left political party in France

New Anticapitalist Party Nouveau Parti anticapitaliste
- Abbreviation: L'Anticapitaliste; NPA-A or NPA-AC; Révolutionnaires; NPA-R
- Leader: Collective leadership (Central committee)
- Main spokesperson: L'Anticapitaliste List: Christine Poupin Philippe Poutou Olivier Besancenot Pauline Salingue; Révolutionnaires List: Selma Labib Damien Scali Gaël Quirante Armelle Pertus
- Founded: 8 February 2009; 17 years ago
- Preceded by: Revolutionary Communist League
- Headquarters: 2, rue Richard-Lenoir 93100 Montreuil
- Newspaper: L'Anticapitaliste; L'Anticapitaliste; Révolutionnaires; Révolutionnaires
- Youth wing: L'Anticapitaliste; NPA Jeunesses Anticapitalistes; Révolutionnaires; NPA Jeunes Révolutionnaires
- Membership (2018): ▼2,000
- Ideology: Anti-capitalism; Eco-socialism; Euroscepticism Feminism Socialism of the 21st century
- Political position: Far-left
- National affiliation: L'Anticapitaliste; New Popular Front (since 2024)
- European affiliation: L'Anticapitaliste; European Anti-Capitalist Left
- International affiliation: L'Anticapitaliste; Fourth International
- Colours: Red
- National Assembly: 0 / 577
- Senate: 0 / 343
- European Parliament: 0 / 72
- Regional councils: 0 / 1,758

Website
- L'Anticapitaliste https://npa-lanticapitaliste.org/ Révolutionnaires https://npa-revolutionnaires.org/

The New Anticapitalist Party (French: Nouveau Parti anticapitaliste [nuvo paʁti ɑ̃tikapitalist], NPA [ɛn pe a]) is a French far-left political party founded in February 2009. The party launched with 9,200 members and was intended to unify the fractured movements of the French radical Left, and attract new activists drawing on the combined strength of far-left parties in the 2002 presidential elections, where they achieved 10.44% of the vote and 7% in 2007.

The political party is closely associated with postal worker Olivier Besancenot, the main spokesman of the former Trotskyist party, the Revolutionary Communist League (LCR), the NPA's main predecessor. In March 2011, Myriam Martin and Christine Poupin were elected the main spokespersons of the NPA. In May 2012, Myriam Martin supported the candidate of the Left Front, Jean-Luc Mélenchon in the 2012 presidential election instead of the NPA candidate, a worker and union activist at Ford's car plant in Bordeaux, Philippe Poutou, who came eighth in the first round with 411,160 votes, 1.15% of the total votes. She left the NPA in July 2012.

In December 2022, the party split into two roughly equal groups, both claiming to be the continuation of the NPA. Two main reasons for the split are to end to the internal disagreements that have plagued the NPA for many years, and to employ different strategies towards NUPES (the New Ecological and Social People's Union). What became the NPA – L'Anticapitaliste joined the New Popular Front, another left coalition, while the NPA – Révolutionnaires stayed independent from the left, and works at the construction of a "Revolutionnary Pole", mainly toward Lutte ouvrière and Révolution Permanente.

== Founding conference ==
At the founding conference (6 to 8 February 2009), 630 delegates voted on a series of documents, which had gone through a long process of amendment and re-amendment in local and regional assemblies.

- The first document "Founding principles" detailed the party's analysis of the impasse of capitalism and the need for both mass mobilization, and, in the long term, the overthrowing of existing institutions.
- The second document was the provisional rulebook, which will remain in effect until the next conference.
- The third document was the Perspectives document, which attempted to set out priorities for the year ahead, and key demands to be pushed for in the immediate future.
- Finally, a document on the European elections expressed the attitude of the party towards the June European elections.

A number of contentious issues within the party, especially those relating to secularism, religion, and Islamophobia, were left open for further debate, leading to a number of difficulties and a tendency to devote considerable time and energy on internal debates, rather than activity. The party's name was originally intended to be temporary; a vote on the name was held at the founding congress, where NPA won over "Revolutionary Anticapitalist Party" (Parti anticapitaliste révolutionnaire) with 53% of the vote.

== Structure ==
Besancenot has stated that it has no single leader and is instead run collectively, being represented by elected spokespersons. The basic structure of the party is the local committee, which organises local activities. A National Political Council decides on general policy. Delegates to the Council are elected at the congress on a proportional basis, ensuring the representation of different tendencies or platforms.

== Ideology ==
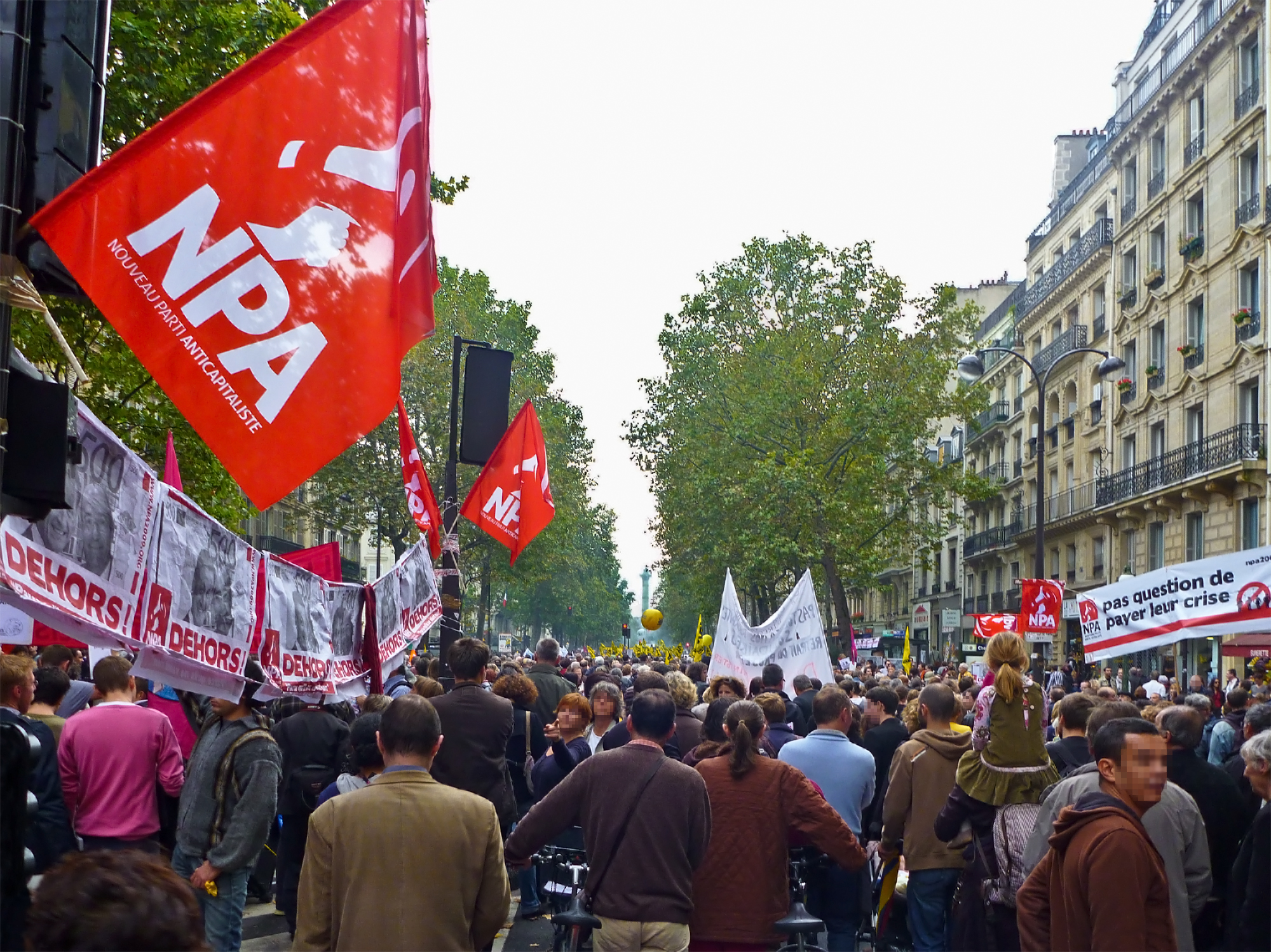
During a demonstration against pension reform in October 2010 in Paris.

The party's stated aim is to "build a new socialist, democratic perspective for the twenty-first century".

Olivier Besancenot has said that the party will be "the left that leads anticapitalist, internationalist, antiracist, ecologist, feminist struggles, opposing all forms of discrimination". The LCR's distinctive identification with Trotskyism was not continued by the NPA. Unlike in previous LCR documents, although feminism is very present, patriarchy theory is not mentioned. Such issues as the withdrawal of French troops from Afghanistan, a rise in the minimum wage and public services, however, are accepted by all members of the NPA.

The party's candidate for the 2022 French presidential election, Philippe Poutou, said in an interview for Franceinfo that he would amnesty all "political prisoners" if elected, such as members of the FLNC and ETA, and condemned France's "colonial attitude" in both Corsica and The Basque Country.

== Alliances and splits ==
Debate continues within the NPA about what sort of alliances with other groups are acceptable. The majority of militants emphasize the dangers of allying with forces which are likely to end up in joint local or national governments with the Socialist Party (PS). A minority believes there is work to be done in wide alliances with antiliberal parties of the left, such as the Party of the Left (PG).

In January 2009, the NPA signed a joint declaration with several other parties of the left, calling for the building of the 29 January national strike. A minority (16%) claimed that such unity in the strike movements means sufficient basis can be found for joint slates at the European elections, while the majority made a sharp distinction between alliances for social movements and electoral alliances. The party received 4.98% of the vote in the European election. Discussions were held in the course of 2009 with other parties to the left of the PS, concerning the possibility of joint slates for the regional elections in 2010. Finally, the NPA presented independent lists in a majority of regions, but joined the Left Front in three regions, and the Left Party in two others.

=== First splits ===
Since its foundation, the NPA has suffered a number of breakaways, and by the beginning of 2015 total membership had declined to 2,100, compared with 9,200 at the time of its Founding Conference in February 2009. In addition to the loss of individual members, three organised groups have left the party in order to join the Left Front: Gauche Unitaire in 2009, Convergences et Alternative in 2011, and the largest of the three, Anticapitalist left (Gauche Anticapitaliste) in July 2012. In addition, failure to reach the required level of support in the presidential and parliamentary elections has deprived the party of state funding, leading to a financial crisis. As a result of these setbacks, the NPA is engaged in an internal debate with the aim of refounding the party and reforming its internal structures. However, the NPA continued to be active in various social movements. It produces a weekly newspaper, Tout est à nous ! (originating as a slogan to be chanted on demonstrations, the name roughly translates as "Everything Belongs to Us!") and a monthly magazine of the same name.

In December 2013, the Revolutionary Marxists faction in the Fourth International declared the Anticapitalism and Revolution current in the NPA and criticized the reformist orientation of the party. In June 2021, almost 300 members of the Revolutionary Communist Current faction (Courante Communiste Révolutionnaire, CCR) left the party after being excluded from participating in the NPA congress and national conference, and the rejection of the pre-candidacy of CCR member Anasse Kazib as the NPA nominee for the 2022 French presidential election.

=== Discussion on joining NUPES ===
The NPA was in discussion to join the New Ecologic and Social People's Union (NUPES) for the 2022 French legislative election. After the PS joined the union, the NPA announced it would not enter the coalition due to insurmountable ideological differences with the PS; The NPA announced they would support the coalition's more radical left-wing candidates. However, this did not resolve the crisis within the party, which came to a confrontation at the 5th congress.

At the NPA's 5th congress in December 2022, three platforms were submitted to a vote.

- Platform A (6.16%) (The revolutionary refoundation of the NPA to update our communist project and rebuild the party): Platform A argued that the NPA remained in crisis and called for a "revolutionary refoundation" of the party rather than either a split or continued stagnation. It emphasized updating the party's communist project, clarifying strategy and programme, rewriting the party's founding texts and statutes, and rebuilding the organisation on a more democratic and activist basis.
- Platform B (48.29%) (United and revolutionary: an NPA useful in the face of capitalism's ravages): Platform B advocated an independent, ecosocialist, unitary and revolutionary NPA. It stressed united-front tactics, cooperation in social and political struggles, democratic self-organisation of the exploited and oppressed, and engagement with activists in and around La France Insoumise and the broader left, while rejecting any dissolution of the NPA into NUPES.
- Platform C (45.55%) (The actuality and urgency of revolution): Platform C argued that the present period made revolution an immediate and urgent question. It defended a sharper political break with the institutional left, described the call to vote for NUPES as a mistake, insisted on the political and organisational independence of revolutionaries, and called for the construction of a broader revolutionary pole, including at the international level.

=== Split between L'Anticapitaliste and Révolutionnaires ===
On the initiative of the backers of Platform B, a split between two groups of equal size occurred during this congress. The backers of Platform B supported by among others Philippe Poutou, Olivier Besancenot on one side and the backers of Platform C with among others Selma Labib and Gaël Quirante, and the currents L'Étincelle and Anticapitalisme & Révolution on the other. After months of fighting over the name and history of the NPA, a legal agreement was reached. The two NPA's would be identified by the names of their respective newspapers. The two new parties would therefore be called NPA – L'Anticapitaliste (Platform B) and NPA – Révolutionnaires (Platform C).

== Hijab controversy ==
The NPA announced in February 2010 that it was fielding Ilham Moussaïd, a Muslim woman, as its candidate in Avignon for that year's regional elections. The party's decision was met with criticism from "across the political spectrum" in France, as Moussaïd wears a hijab (a headscarf worn by Muslim women) and the announcement came amidst a national debate regarding the wearing of hijabs in public areas. A few weeks prior to the announcement, the NPA denounced bans on hijabs as "Islamophobic and draconian". Tony Todd of France 24 described the party's decision to field Moussaïd as "radical pragmatism" aimed at securing votes from France's Muslim community.

Moussaïd describes herself as "feminist, secular, and veiled"; however, critics of Moussaïd argue that hijabs are an affront to women and incompatible with Moussaïd's values. In response, Moussaïd stated in March 2010:

These feminists say that it's a symbol of oppression, of submission. For my part, I'm not submissive; it's a personal choice. I'm a feminist. I fight for women's rights with my women comrades. I fight for equality between men and women. I fight for the right to abortion, the right to contraception. It's true they see it as a symbol of oppression but unfortunately they forget that there are women who wear it out of choice. A certain number of women are obliged to wear it, of course, I don't deny that, and I'll fight for these women. But you can't say that all those who've chosen to wear a headscarf are submissive. It's not true. Once it's a question of personal choice you can't say the person is being oppressed, as these feminists argue. For me, being a feminist means defending the right of women to have control over their own lives. I have control over mine and I've made this choice but it's not respected. These feminists don't respect it because I haven't made the same choice as them. My response is that there's not just one way to be a feminist; there's not just one way to be a woman. We can't all be alike. We need to concentrate on what unites us, on the fight for equality between men and women, and not to say we should all dress the same way, that you can't wear a headscarf because otherwise you're not a feminist. I think that shows a lack of respect. I don't feel represented by feminists who say that the headscarf is always a question of obligation. There are a lot of feminists who agree with me, who see that I'm fighting the same battles as them, and they support me.

== Election results ==
=== Legislative elections ===
Election year	First round		Second round		Seats	+/-	Notes
Election year	Votes	%	Votes	%	Seats	+/-	Notes
2012	77 975	0.3	—		0 / 577	New	
2017	5 460	0.02	—		0 / 577	0	
2022	5 244	0.02	—		0 / 577	0	
2024	23 630	0.07	46 134	0.17	0 / 577	0	NPA – L'Anticapitaliste, within the New Popular Front coalition. Philippe Poutou was candidate up to the second round, but lost against Christophe Barthès (RN). Raphaël Arnault (LFI) was elected with his substitute being a member of the NPA – L'Anticapitaliste.
2024	5 964	0.02	—		0 / 577	0	NPA – Révolutionnaires, aside from coalitions.

=== Presidential elections ===
Election year	Candidate	First round			Second round			Result
Election year	Candidate	Votes	%	Rank	Votes	%	Rank	Result
2012	Philippe Poutou	411,160	1.15	▲8th	—N/a			Lost
2017	Philippe Poutou	394,505	1.09	8th	—N/a			Lost
2022	Philippe Poutou	268,904	0.77	▼11th	—N/a			Lost

=== European elections ===
Election year	Votes	%	Seats	Rank
2009	840 833	4.88	0 / 74	7^{th}
2014	74 770	0.39	0 / 74	16^{th}
2019	calls to vote Lutte ouvrière			
2024	NPA – L'Anticapitaliste calls to vote LFI			
2024	37 440	0.15	0 / 81	18^{th}

== See also ==
- Criticism of capitalism
- Trotskyism in France
- Lutte Ouvrière
- List of political parties in France

== Sources ==
- "Le Nouveau parti anticapitaliste d'Olivier Besancenot est lancé", Agence France-Presse, 29 June 2008
- "'Le Nouveau Parti anticapitaliste ne doit pas être une LCR relookée'", Le Monde, 30 June 2008
- "Le Nouveau parti anticapitaliste, c'est parti", Radio France Internationale, 30 June 2008
- Interview (in English) of one activist by the Daily Maybe
- Ongoing coverage on the NPA in LINKS (in English)
- Anticapitalism and Revolution current in the NPA
