= Alternative List (disambiguation) =

The Alternative List is a name used by many political parties around the world. These political parties are generally green or socialist though their exact ideologies can range from center-left to far-left.

Political parties by this name include:

== Europe ==
=== Current ===
- AD+PD (Malta)
- Alternative Ecologists (Greece)
- Alternative Left (Switzerland)
- Alternative Left (Spain)
- Alternative List (Switzerland)
- Alternative Liste Innsbruck
- AUF Gelsenkirchen
- Green Alternative Freiburg
- Green Alternative (Hungary)
- Green Alternative (Russia)
- Green Alternative – Sustainable Development of Croatia
- Grüne Alternative in den Räten NRW
- Neighbors' Alternative (Spain, Galicia)
- The Alternative (Denmark)
- The Greens–Green Alternative (Spain, Catalonia)
- The Greens–The Ecologist Alternative (Spain, Catalonia)
- The Greens – The Green Alternative (Austria)
- United and Alternative Left (Spain, Catalonia)

=== Historical ===
- Alternative Liste für Demokratie und Umweltschutz (Germany, Berlin), 1978–1993
- Alternative List - Resist (Luxembourg), 1979
- Alternative List (Germany, Bremen), 1979–1980
- Alternative List Austria, 1982–1986
- Betrieblich-Alternative Liste (Germany, Bremen), c. 1983
- Alternative List/Alternative Green List (Italy, South Tyrol), 1983–1988
- Green Alternative–Ecologist Movement of Catalonia (Spain, Catalonia), 1983–1993
- Green Alternative Party (Luxembourg), 1983–1994
- Green Alternative European Link, 1984–1989
- Green-Alternative List (Germany, Hamburg), 1984–2012
- Democratic Alternative (Finland), 1986–1990
- Alternative Rouge et Verte (France), 1989–1998
- Democratic Alternative (Malta), 1989–2020
- Alternative Greens (Italy, Aosta Valley), 1990–2010
- Les Alternatifs (France), 1998–2015
- Cangas Left Alternative (Spain, Cangas), 2007–2023
- Fédération pour une alternative sociale et écologique (France), 2008–2013

== Americas ==
- Alternative Left Democracy, name taken by the Communist Party of Chile in the 1990s
- Social Democratic and Peasant Alternative Party (Mexico), 2005–2009

== See also ==
- Alt left
- Alternative movement
- Alternative Party (disambiguation)
- Anders Gaan Leven
- The Other Vorarlberg
- The Other Europe
- Wien anders
