= Communist Committees for Self-Management =

The Communist Committees for Self-Management (CCA) (French: Comités communistes pour l'autogestion) were a far-left French organization that existed from 1977 to 1982. It brought together Pabloist activists and the "Carrefour Group" of the Revolutionary Communist League (LCR). The group had no more than 300 members at its height.

== Origins ==
The CCAs emerged from the meeting of activists, often students, who identified as both Trotskyist and supporters of self-management. The founding members generally came from two political parties:

- The Revolutionary Communist League (LCR), particularly the Carrefour Group, a minority faction primarily active in the student, high school, and healthcare sectors. This group, led by figures such as Gilles Casanova (Swanee), Gérard Delahaye (Ingrid), Robi Morder (Ernesto), François Morvan (Dietrich), and Francis Pothier (Laroche), emphasized the importance of social movements and self-management as tools for political action. They leaned towards Pabloism in their stance on new social movements like feminism and environmentalism. They also advocated for a merger of the PSU (Unified Socialist Party) and the LCR.
- The Unified Socialist Party (PSU), specifically its Tendency B, where former activists of the Revolutionary Marxist Alliance (AMR), inspired by Pabloism, were particularly active. This faction was led by figures such as Michel Fiant, Gilbert Marquis, and Maurice Najman, with additional leadership in the student sector from Charly Najman, feminists, and Marguerite Guillien in rural activism.

Contacts were made following the 1976 spring protests against the Saunier-Seïté Plan. Initial discussions between the Carrefour Group and former AMR leaders formalized in late 1976. Initially, there was no intention to create a new organization but rather to work toward an LCR/PSU merger. However, events led to the departure of the Carrefour Group from the LCR. The PSU's Tendency B convened a national meeting on 7–8 May 1977, which became the founding assembly of the CCAs after the LCR rejected a merger with the PSU and the PSU aligned with the Union of the Left for the 1977 French municipal elections. Shortly afterward, militants from the Organization of Communist Workers (OCT), including Didier Leschi, joined the CCAs.

== Activities ==
The CCAs never significantly grew. While their founding meeting in May 1977 drew 600 participants, their membership quickly dwindled to 250 by their first congress in Lyon (October 1977) and stabilized between 200 and 300 members. In some respects, they resembled more of an intellectual club than a genuine organization. During the March 1978 legislative elections, they participated in "For Socialism, Power to the Workers" lists with the LCR and the OCT.

The CCAs were active in several sectors, including trade unions, high schools, and universities. In 1979, they established the Self-Management Trade Union Tendency (TSA) within the Movement of Action Syndicale (MAS). The TSA played a key role in founding the UNEF-ID in 1980 but later split over ideological differences.

In high schools, the CCAs founded the Permanent Lycée Coordination (CPL), a self-management-oriented union.

== Decline and Dissolution ==
The CCAs began to fragment in 1981, and by 1982, significant portions of their membership had returned to the LCR, joined the Socialist Party, or dissolved into broader leftist movements. The TSA maintained some influence within UNEF-ID into the 1980s, and former members contributed to initiatives like Alternative Rouge et Verte and Les Alternatifs.

== Legacy ==
Many former members of the CCAs later joined Ensemble!, a member of the Left Front.

== Sources ==
- Sophie Béroud, Patrick Le Tréhondat, René Mouriaux, Patrick Silberstein, "Éléments pour l’étude du courant 'pabliste'," in Frank Georgi (ed.), Autogestion. La dernière utopie, Paris, Publications de la Sorbonne, 2003.
- Roland Biard, Dictionnaire de l'extrême-gauche, Paris, Belfond, 1978.
- Serge Cosseron, Dictionnaire de l'extrême-gauche, Paris, Larousse, 2007.
- Bruno Della Sudda, Jean-Pierre Hardy, Arthur Leduc, Patrick Silberstein, "Mouvement syndical, forces politiques et autogestion en France" in L'autogestion hier, aujourd'hui, demain, Paris, Syllepse, 2010.
- Archives: BDIC (Nanterre), Cité des mémoires étudiantes (Aubervilliers), CHT (Nantes).
- Salles, Jean-Paul (2005). La Ligue Communiste Révolutionnaire (1968-1981) (in French). Presses Universitaires de Rennes. ISBN 2-7535-0194-7.
- Isabelle Sommier, "Les gauchismes," in Dominique Damamme et al., Mai-Juin 1968, Paris, L'Atelier, 2008.
