= Revolutionary Marxist Alliance =

The Revolutionary Marxist Alliance (French: Alliance marxiste révolutionnaire, AMR) was a Trotskyist movement with a Pabloist orientation, closely aligned with libertarian ideas and active from 1969 to 1974. It founded the publication L'Internationale in 1970. The AMR distinguished itself from other Trotskyist groups through its emphasis on and promotion of the concept and practices of self-management.

The first Revolutionary Marxist Alliance was established in 1969 by Pabloist activists who had split from the Fourth International in 1965. It dissolved in 1974 to join the Unified Socialist Party (PSU, Tendency B). This union was short-lived, as its members later left to establish the Communist Committees for Self-Management (CCA) alongside former activists from the Revolutionary Communist League (LCR).

Following the 1981 French presidential election, the "Tendency I" faction of the CCA revived the name AMR. Members of the original AMR, such as Gilbert Marquis and Michel Fiant, participated in this second AMR, while some later joined the Alternative Rouge et Verte (AREV) and subsequently Les Alternatifs.

== Origins ==
The movement was heavily influenced by activists like Michel Fiant and Gilbert Marquis, who were initially members of the Internationalist Communist Party. From 1953, Fiant served as secretary of the CGT union at the Derveaux factory in Bezons and led the Pabloist group during the PCI's split through entrism, ultimately joining the French Communist Party (PCF).

Gilbert Marquis spent time in Yugoslavia, working with labor brigades supporting the regime of Josip Broz Tito against Joseph Stalin, and later became a permanent union representative for the CGT at Chausson factories in Gennevilliers.

Their entrism activities, supported by Michel Pablo, failed by 1958 when the PCF purged the activists behind Tribune de discussion, marking the end of this strategic approach.

== Formation of the AMR ==
The AMR was founded in 1969 by militants of the Fourth International's Revolutionary Marxist Tendency (TMR-IV), along with students and high school activists radicalized by the events of May 1968. Among the new members were Maurice Najman, Maurice Ronai, and Bernard Schalscha from Collège-lycée Jacques-Decour, as well as other notable figures like Joël Grynbaum and Nicolas Baby.

== Activities ==
=== Advocacy for Self-Management ===
The AMR stood out among Trotskyist organizations for its emphasis on self-management as a revolutionary strategy. It advocated for workers to spontaneously take control of enterprises during revolutionary processes and operate them independently.

=== Early Engagement with Ecology ===
The AMR was an early adopter of ecologist ideas within the French far-left. Its magazine L'Internationale published articles on pollution as early as March 1971, and later argued that "the fight against pollution is not a capitalist diversion."

=== Engagement with New Social Movements ===
The AMR actively participated in new social movements like the Women's Liberation Movement (MLF), the Soldiers' Rights Movement, and early environmental campaigns.

== Dissolution ==
The AMR merged with the PSU in 1974, following the departure of Michel Rocard's faction. However, many of its members left after three years to form the Communist Committees for Self-Management (CCA) with former LCR activists.

== Legacy ==
The AMR was revived in 1981 by former members of the CCA, later contributing to the creation of Alternative Rouge et Verte and Les Alternatifs.

== Bibliography ==
- Sirinelli, Jean-François (2003). Les Baby-boomers. Fayard.
- Bernard Ravenel (2016). Quand la gauche se réinventait. La Découverte. ISBN 978-2-7071-8889-2.
- Christophe Nick (2002). Les Trotskistes. Fayard. ISBN 978-2-213-61155-6.
