= Timeline of strikes in 1973 =

Strikes in 1973

In 1973, a number of labour strikes, labour disputes, and other industrial actions occurred.

== Background ==
A labour strike is a work stoppage caused by the mass refusal of employees to work. This can include wildcat strikes, which are done without union authorisation, and slowdown strikes, where workers reduce their productivity while still carrying out minimal working duties. It is usually a response to employee grievances, such as low pay or poor working conditions. Strikes can also occur to demonstrate solidarity with workers in other workplaces or pressure governments to change policies.

== Timeline ==
=== Continuing strikes from 1972 ===
- 1970–73 Fine Tubes strike, 3-year strike by Fine Tubes workers in the United Kingdom.
- 1972–73 Philadelphia teachers' strikes, series of two strikes by teachers in Philadelphia, United States, in late-1972 and early-1973.

=== January ===
- 1973 Durban strikes, part of the Durban Moment in South Africa.
- 1973 Egyptian student protests
- 1973 Lebanon teachers' strike
- 1973 Rennes medical students' strike, 94-day strike by medical students in Rennes in protest over a lack of medical resources in Brittany.
- 1973 St. Louis teachers' strike, strike by teachers in St. Louis, United States.
- 1973 Shell USA strike
- 1973 Wee Waa strike, strike by predominantly Aboriginal cotton workers in Wee Waa, Australia.

=== February ===
- One-day Loyalist Association of Workers Day of Action in Northern Ireland.
- Wave of students strikes in France against the 1973 Debré Law fr on military service proposed by French Minister of Defence Michel Debré.
- 1973 British Gas strike, 6-week series of strikes and slowdowns by British Gas workers in the United Kingdom.
- 1973 Cambodian teachers' strike
- 1973 French air traffic controllers strike
- 1973 ICI Botany strike, strike by Imperial Chemical Industries workers in Botany Bay, Australia.
- 1973 Melbourne gravediggers' strike, 12-day strike by cemetery workers in Melbourne, Australia.

=== March ===
- 1973 Air India strike
- 1973 Max Factor strike, strike by 21 Max Factor workers in Malaysia following the firing of one of their colleagues.
- Storkonflikten 1973, one of the largest industrial conflicts in Danish history, involving strikes and lockouts.
- 1973 Ulaveo strike, 2-week strike by Ulaveo coconut factory workers in Kokopo, Papua New Guinea.
- Walpole prison strike

=== April ===
- 1973 ABC strike, strike by women script assistants at the Australian Broadcasting Corporation.
- 1973 Antwerp dock strike, extended wildcat strike by dockworkers in Antwerp, Belgium.
- 1973 El Teniente miners' strike, 74-day strike by copper miners at the El Teniente mine in Chile.
- 1973 Hong Kong teachers' strike, led by the Hong Kong Professional Teachers' Union.
- 1973 Italian postal strike, 3-week strike by postal workers in Italy.
- 1973 Japanese transit strike
- 1973–76 LIP strikes, at the LIP in France.
- 1973 New York City gravediggers' strike

=== May ===
- 1973 Broadmeadows Ford strike, strike at the Broadmeadows Assembly Plant in Australia.
- 1973 Revlon strike, strike by Revlon cosmetics workers in Rydalmere, New South Wales, Australia, over changes in working conditions meant to speed up production.

=== June ===
- 1973 Israel doctors' strike, 29-day strike by doctors in Israel ove wages and working conditions.
- 1973 New South Wales beer strike, strike by brewery workers in New South Wales, Australia.
- 1973 Soviet Jews hunger strike, 2-week hunger strike by seven Jewish scientists in the Soviet Union demanding to be allowed to emigrate to Israel.
- 1973 Sydney Philosophy strike, strike by University of Sydney Department of Philosophy students in Australia demanding the introduction of a women's studies course.
- 1973 Uruguayan general strike, strike against the 1973 Uruguayan coup d'état.

=== July ===
- 1973–74 Brookside strike, 13-month strike by coal miners in Harlan County, Kentucky, United States.
- 1973 Klamath Falls police strike, 13-day strike by police in Klamath Falls, Oregon, United States.

=== August ===
- 1973 Artistic Woodwork strike, in Canada.
- 1973 Canadian paper mills strike
- 1973 Canadian rail strike
- 1973 Chile truckers' strike
- 1973 Ford Germany strikes, de, wildcat strikes at Ford Germany.

=== September ===
- Con-Mech Dispute, industrial dispute including a strike at the Con-Mech company in Woking, United Kingdom, over union recognition.
- 1973 Sydney Airport strike, 5-week strike by communications workers at Sydney Airport in Australia.

=== October ===
- 1973 Kings Cross strippers' strike
- 1973 Mount Newman strike, 17-day strike by miners in Newman, Western Australia.
- 1973 South Korean student protests, protests including strikes by students in South Korea against the dictatorship of Park Chung Hee.
- 1973 Thai popular uprising

=== November ===
- Athens Polytechnic uprising
- 1973 Detroit Strike for Palestine, 1-day wildcat strike by Arab American autoworkers in Detroit, United States, calling for the United Auto Workers to divest from Israel.
- 1973 French retaillers' strike, strike by fruit and vegetable retailers in France.
- 1973 New York City Ballet strike, 25-day strike by New York City Ballet dancers in the United States.

=== December ===
- 1973–74 American truckers' strikes
- 1973 Tripoli general strike, general strike in Tripoli, Lebanon.

== List of lockouts in 1973 ==
- 1973 Major League Baseball lockout

== Statistics ==
There were five strikes in Singapore in 1973, involving a total of 1312 workers and 2295 working days lost, four of which were triggered by firings.
