= Charles Piaget =

French watchmaker and trade unionist (1928–2023)

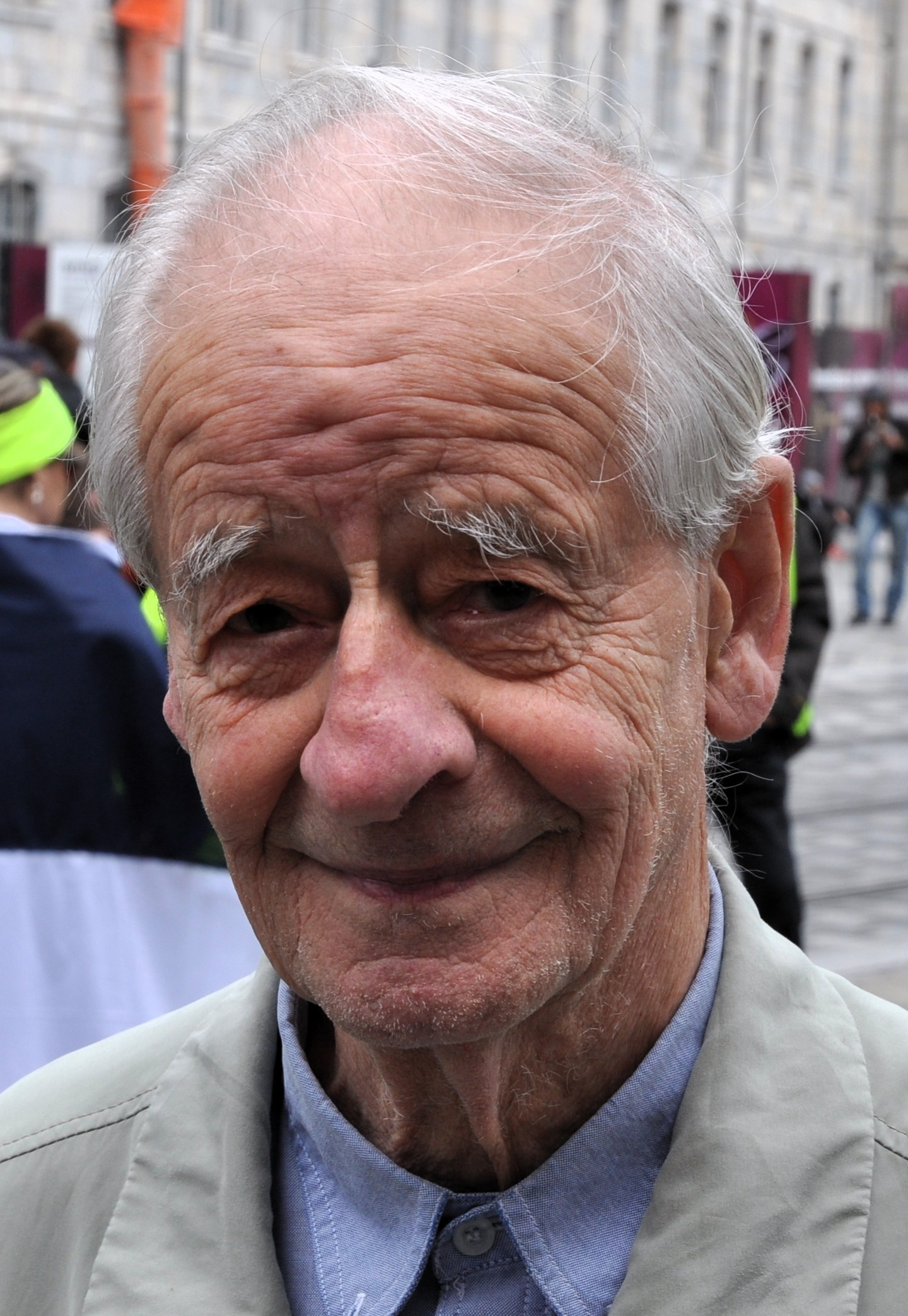
- Piaget in 2019
- Born: 23 July 1928; Besançon, France
- Died: 4 November 2023 (aged 95); Besançon, France
- Occupations: Watchmaker; Trade unionist

Charles Piaget (23 July 1928 – 4 November 2023) was a French watchmaker and trade unionist.

Piaget was particularly active during the LIP affair and was an emblematic figure of the workers' self-management movement.

== Biography ==
Born in Besançon on 23 July 1928, Piaget joined LIP in 1946 and unionized with the French Confederation of Christian Workers (CFTC) on his first day. He became politically active during the Algerian War, to which he was opposed. He first joined the Union of the Socialist Left (UGS) and subsequently the Unified Socialist Party (PSU) in 1960. During those years, he was close with those who ran the Voix Ouvrière, and through these acquaintances, he learned more about Marxism. In 1964, he, alongside other members of the CFTC, founded the French Democratic Confederation of Labour (CFDT).

In 1973, when LIP filed for bankruptcy and threatened the closure of the Besançon factory, Piaget led a strike of CFDT union members. At the end of the conflict, he declared "The success (of a trade union movement) is no longer needing a leader… or at least: their voice only counts as one".

Piaget was a candidate in the 1974 French presidential election after support from a minority of PSU members alongside other far-left groups, such as the Revolutionary Communist League and the Revolutionary Marxist Alliance. Jean-Paul Sartre declared his support in Libération. However, the PSU ended up giving its support to François Mitterrand after a proposal by party leader Michel Rocard and backed up by a majority party vote. Piaget retired in 1988, but maintained his activism within the Agir ensemble contre le chômage (AC !).

Charles Piaget died in Besançon on 4 November 2023, at the age of 95.

== Publications ==
- Lip 73 (1973)
- Lip : Charles Piaget et les LIP racontent (1973)
- Que signifie aujourd'hui militer pour le socialisme, être révolutionnaire? (1974)
- L'autogestion : une idée toujours neuve (2005)
- Faire des hommes libres : Boimondau et les communautés de travail à Valence, 1941-1982 (2008)
- Caron-Ozanne : une expérience d'autogestion en Normandie : 1975-1977 (2009)
- La force du collectif : Entretien avec Charles Piaget (2012)
- On fabrique, on vend, on se paie : Lip 1973 (2021)

== Filmography ==
- Lip, une école de la lutte à l'usage des jeunes générations (2009)
- Penser critique : kit de survie éthique et politique pour situations de crise[s] (2012)
