= Timeline of strikes in 1975 =

Strikes in 1975

A number of labour strikes, labour disputes, and other industrial actions occurred in 1975.

== Background ==
A labour strike is a work stoppage caused by the mass refusal of employees to work. This can include wildcat strikes, which are done without union authorisation, and slowdown strikes, where workers reduce their productivity while still carrying out minimal working duties. It is usually a response to employee grievances, such as low pay or poor working conditions. Strikes can also occur to demonstrate solidarity with workers in other workplaces or pressure governments to change policies.

== Timeline ==
=== Continuing strikes from 1974 ===
- 1973–76 LIP strikes, at the LIP in France.

=== January ===
- 1975 Glasgow rubbish strike, 13-week strike by waste collectors in Glasgow, Scotland.
- 1975–80 Sonacotra rent strike, rent strike by immigrant workers in France.

=== February ===
- Limazo, police strike and attempted coup d'état in Lima, Peru.
- 1975 McDonnell Douglas strike, 85-day strike by McDonnell Douglas workers in the United States.
- 1975 Renault strike, in France.

=== March ===
- 1975 Dong-A Ilbo strike, strike by The Dong-A Ilbo journalists in South Korea.
- 1975 Swedish forestry workers' strike, 74-day wildcat strike by forestry workers in Northern Sweden

=== April ===
- 1975 Greek journalists strike

=== May ===
- 1975–77 Le Parisien Libéré strike, 29-month strike by Le Parisien Libéré printers in France.
- 1975 Mauritian student protests
- 1975 University of Papua New Guinea strike, student strike ahead of the independence of Papua New Guinea from Australia calling for the removal of Elizabeth II as Monarch of Papua New Guinea.

=== June ===
- General strike in Argentina in response to the Rodrigazo policies.
- Occupation of Saint-Nizier church by Lyon prostitutes

=== August ===
- 1975 Belgian boatmens' strike
- 1975 Melbourne printers' strike
- 1975 San Francisco police strike
- 1975 Westclox strike, 4-week strike by Westclox workers in Peru, Illinois, United States.

=== September ===
- 1975 Broadway strike, 1-month strike by Broadway theatre musicians in the United States.
- 1975 Corsican general strike, general strike in Corsica demanding home rule
- 1975 National Airlines strike, 127-day strike by National Airlines flight attendants in the United States.

=== October ===
- 1975 Cook County Hospital strike, 18-day strike by doctors at Cook County Hospital in the United States, one of the longest doctors strikes in American history at that point.
- 1975 Icelandic women's strike, 1-day strike by almost the entire female population of Iceland against the gender pay gap and occupational sexism.
- 1975 La Tondeña Distillery strike
- 1975 Steggles strike, 2-week strike by women Steggles Pty Ltd workers in Australia over wages and working conditions.
- 1975 UK junior doctors' strike
- 1975 University of Pennsylvania strike, 6-week strike by University of Pennsylvania machinists and maintenance workers in the United States.
- 1975–1976 Washington Post pressmen's strike

=== November ===
- 1975 Japanese public sector strike, 8-day strike by Japanese public sector workers calling for the right to strike, one of the largest strikes in Japanese history at that point.
- 1975 New Haven teachers' strike
- 1975 Saint Vincent and the Grenadines teachers' strike, 1-month strike by teachers in Saint Vincent and the Grenadines.

=== December ===
- 1975–1976 Pittsburgh teachers' strike

== Changes in legislation ==
In May, the Francoist dictatorship in Spain dictatorship announced that it would legalise the right to strike in limited cases. Strikes had previously been banned since the dictatorship seized power in 1939.

In November, Filipino dictator Ferdinand Marcos issued Presidential Decree No. 823, prohibiting all forms of strike action in the Philippines.
