= Lip affair =

1970s labor strike

The Lip affair refers to a significant labor strike that occurred at the Lip watchmaking factory in Besançon, Doubs, France. Initiated in the early 1970s, this protracted struggle continued until mid-1976 and mobilized tens of thousands of participants across France and Europe. A notable event during this period was the Lip march on September 29, 1973, which attracted over 100,000 demonstrators.

Several factors contributed to the scale of this workers' struggle. Among these was the introduction of "self-management", a novel approach in which striking workers took control of production within the factory, operating independently and producing watches that were subsequently sold at unauthorized sales events. The political dimensions of the affair also played a role, prompting government intervention to address potential nationwide labor unrest.

The Lip affair marked a transformative moment in the trade union movement, signifying the rise of spontaneous grassroots movements that garnered extensive media coverage. This period produced a substantial amount of press and film content, which included various portrayals of the company's management and shareholders.

== History ==
=== Lip, from a family business to a factory ===
Lip, a historic watch manufacturer founded in 1867, experienced significant financial challenges during the 1960s, primarily due to rising competition from low-cost watches, particularly those produced in Asian countries.

In 1967, Fred Lipmann, who changed his name to Fred Lip after World War II, decided to open the company's capital. He sold 33% of his shares to Ébauches SA, a Swiss company that was a subsidiary of ASUAG, a major watchmaking consortium that would later become part of the Swatch Group.

In 1973, Lip launched its first French quartz watches. However, the company encountered significant competition from American and Japanese manufacturers, which affected its market position. On April 17, 1973, Jacques Saint-Esprit, the managing director, resigned, and shortly thereafter, SA Lip filed for bankruptcy. This set the stage for a nationwide strike that unfolded in the weeks that followed at the Lip factory.

=== Beginnings of the Lip affair ===
In May 1973, an action committee, known as the "Comité d'Action" (CA), was reestablished, drawing on the ideas and methods from the events of May 1968.

On June 12, during an extraordinary Works council meeting, workers faced the threat of bankruptcy. Several workers accessed the briefcase of a company director, discovering management's plans to lay off 480 employees and divest from the mechanical industry, retaining only watchmaking operations. During this tense period, Administrator Laverny and other board members were held overnight by the workers, who demanded updates on negotiations occurring in Paris. Workers also uncovered management's intentions to eliminate the sliding wage scale and impose a wage freeze.

In response, the Palente plant was occupied, and that night, a stock of 25,000 watches was concealed. The Prefect of Doubs traveled to Paris to reach the Minister of Industry, Jean Charbonnel. The strike was led by Charles Piaget, a member of the PSU and leader of the CFDT, alongside Jean Raguenès. Benny Levy, founder of the Gauche prolétarienne, remained in Besançon throughout the summer.

By June 18, a general assembly resolved to resume production under workers' control to secure "a living wage." The workers' struggle gained momentum under the slogan: "C'est possible: on fabrique, on vend, on se paie", reflecting their commitment to self-management. The General Confederation of Labour (France) and the French Democratic Confederation of Labour collaborated with Les Cahiers de Mai magazine to produce a strike newspaper, Lip-Unité, which played a crucial role in publicizing the movement. Additionally, it was decided that all watches would be sold at a 42% discount, similar to the rates offered to the network of watchmakers and jewelers.

On August 2, the Minister for Industrial Development, Jean Charbonnel, appointed Henry Giraud as a mediator to facilitate discussions between the involved parties. Negotiations commenced on August 11, involving the unions, the Comité d'Action, and Giraud.

However, on August 14, following orders from the Minister of the Interior, the Compagnies Républicaines de Sécurité (C.R.S.) entered the plant, forcibly removing the occupying workers. This occupation continued until February 1974. The police action prompted numerous companies in Besançon and its surrounding areas to initiate strikes, resulting in confrontations with law enforcement. Trade union representatives intervened to de-escalate tensions, although approximately thirty workers were arrested during subsequent demonstrations. Amidst these developments, clandestine production of watches resumed. In Cerizay, Deux-Sèvres, a group of ninety-six workers began producing blouses, branded as PIL, outside the factory.

The direct sale of Lip watches at wholesale prices met with resistance from the HBJO (watchmaking, jewelry, and goldsmithing) network. The National Federation of Watchmakers and Jewelers filed a legal complaint, alleging that the sale of Lip watches outside authorized shops was illegal. In response, supporters of Lip emulated the tactics of activists advocating for legalized abortion, collectively signing a "manifesto of receivers" in September 1973 to bolster their cause.

=== Political support ===
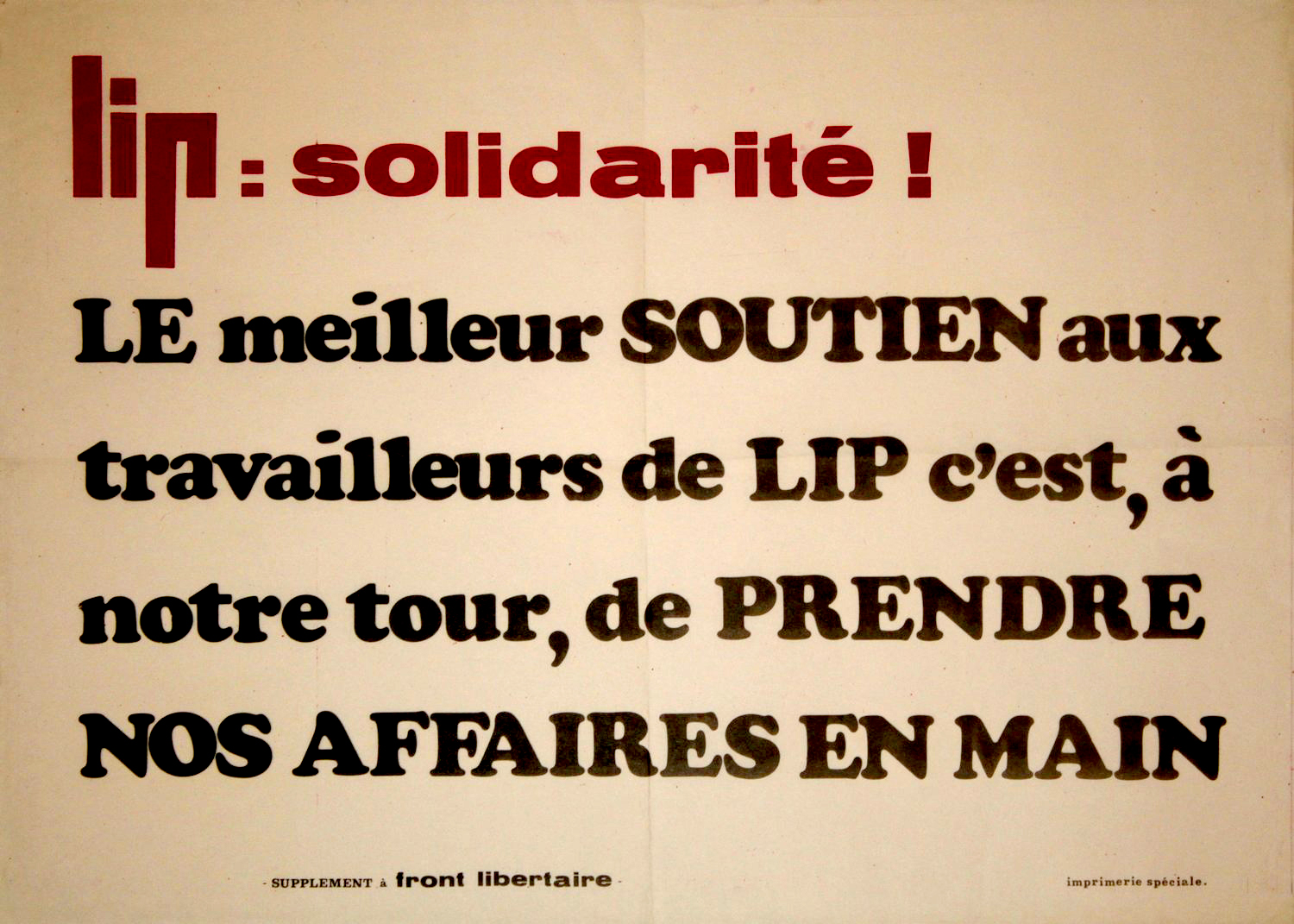
Revolutionary Anarchist Organization poster in support of the Lip struggle.

On September 29, the nationwide march was organized in Besançon, attracting nearly 100,000 participants, many of whom traveled from other regions. Despite adverse weather conditions, this event, known as the "March of 100,000", showcased widespread solidarity for the Lip workers. Prominent figures, such as Michel Rocard from the Unified Socialist Party, attended to ensure the demonstration proceeded smoothly in front of the Socialist city council, the Communist Party (PCF), and the General Confederation of Labour (CGT). Various leftist groups, including the Unified Socialist Party, the Revolutionary Communist League, the Gauche prolétarienne, and the Revolutionary Anarchist Organization, were also represented, with far-left activists comprising about 30,000 participants. Tensions between the CFDT and the GCL intensified during this period.

On October 15, Prime Minister Pierre Messmer announced, "Lip, it's over!" Concurrently, several leaders from the CNPF (National Council of French Employers) — including Antoine Riboud, Renaud Gillet, and José Bidegain — were involved in efforts to resolve the crisis. Ultimately, Claude Neuschwander, second-in-command at the Publicis group and a member of the Unified Socialist Party, was dispatched by Michel Rocard, the national secretary of the PSU, to negotiate with the unions, suppliers, and financiers regarding the potential takeover of Lip.

On January 29, 1974, the Lip delegation signed the Dole agreements, stipulating the takeover of the entire workforce in exchange for the return of 7 tons of documents and equipment, along with between 15,000 and 20,000 watches, and a payment of 2 million francs. This financial compensation was intended to address the grievances of approximately 3,000 watch merchants who had struggled to compete against the unauthorized sale of Lip watches. Following these developments, the Compagnie Européenne d'Horlogerie, led by Claude Neuschwander, assumed control of Lip's watchmaking operations, gradually reintegrating 830 workers starting on March 11, 1974. This transition marked the conclusion of the strike.

=== Neuschwander management ===
Claude Neuschwander and his supporters sought to demonstrate that a new management approach, inspired by the ideals of May 1968, was viable. To document this experience, Antoine Riboud collaborated with a journalist from Le Nouvel Observateur, resulting in the publication of the book Patron, mais... (1975). However, despite these initiatives, Neuschwander faced significant challenges in effectively revitalizing the business.

=== A new conflict ===
Over the following two years, the new management team at Lip encountered several unforeseen challenges, including leadership changes, as Jean Charbonnel, who had been instrumental during the earlier phases of the crisis, departed from the company following the election of Valéry Giscard d'Estaing as President of the Republic.

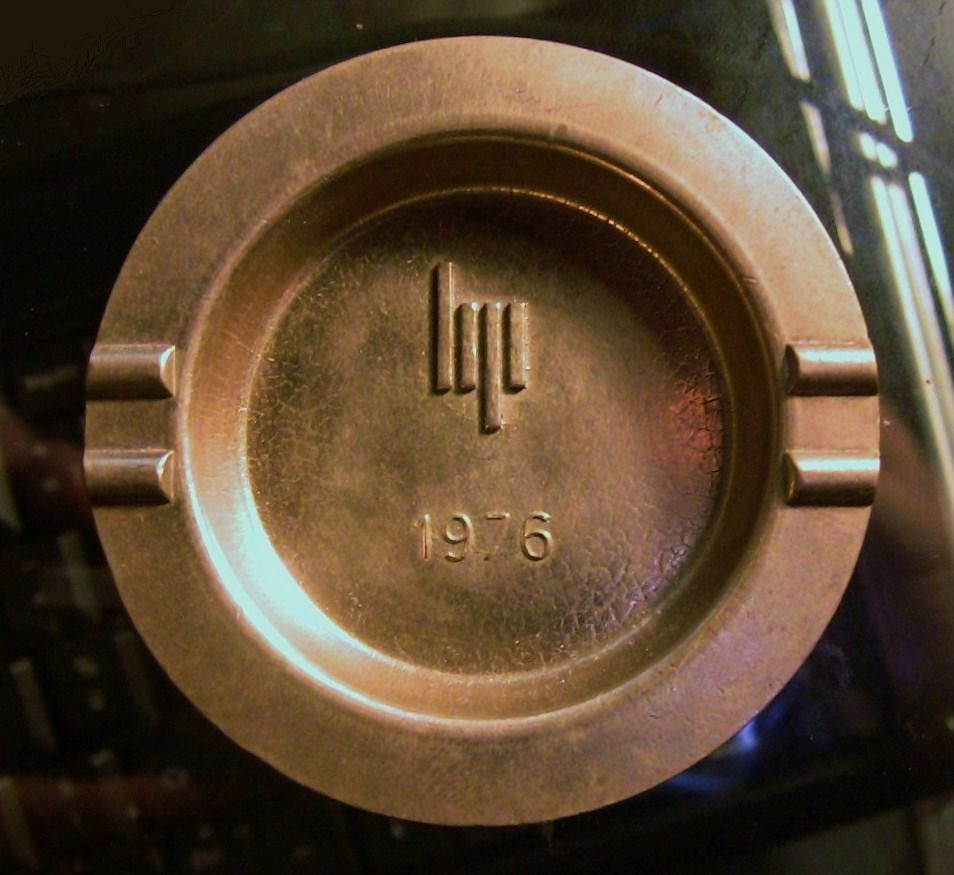
An ashtray from the Lip factory

Jean Charbonnel, who served as Minister of Industry in 1973, later asserted that during the first oil crisis, Giscard d'Estaing and Prime Minister Jacques Chirac effectively "murdered Lip." This sentiment stemmed from the belief that Lip symbolized a union victory with the potential to influence broader social and political dynamics. During this period, the Ministry of Industry suspended subsidies related to the Quartz plan, and Renault, a nationalized company, canceled its orders for dashboard clocks.

On February 8, 1976, Claude Neuschwander was dismissed by Antoine Riboud, who remarked, "Until Lip, we were in a capitalism where the company was at the heart of the economy. Afterward, we found ourselves in a form of capitalism where finance and the interests of money have replaced enterprise". Michel Rocard, a key proponent of Neuschwander's appointment, contested this viewpoint, stating, "Neuschwander put Lip back into bankruptcy, period." This perspective was also echoed by Claude Peyrot, the architect of the 1973 recovery plan upon which the Dole agreements were based. Neuschwander later invoked his right of reply in Le Monde on April 8 and 9, 2007, quoting Charbonnel from the film Lip: L'imagination au pouvoir: "Jean Charbonnel, then Minister of Industry, says it clearly, with singular force: they murdered Lip".

In April 1976, the Compagnie Européenne d'Horlogerie filed for bankruptcy.

On May 5, 1976, the Lip workers initiated a new occupation of the factory, successfully restarting watch production. The newspaper Libération captured this resurgence with the headline "Lip, c'est reparti!".

=== The rest and the end of Lip ===
Faced with a persistent lack of buyers, Lip was ultimately liquidated on September 12, 1977. Following extensive negotiations, on November 28, 1977, members of the Lip family established six cooperatives (SCOPs), including Les Industries de Palente, thus preserving the Lip name as an acronym into the 1980s. In 1983, the SCOP Les Industries de Palente was transformed into a Société à Responsabilité Limitée (SARL), a limited liability company. In 1986, it was acquired by the Société Mortuacienne d'Horlogerie (SMH Kiplé), which subsequently faced liquidation in 1990.

== Literature on the subject ==
=== Films ===
==== Monique, Lip I and La marche de Besançon, Lip II ====
Monique, Lip I and La marche de Besançon, Lip II are two documentaries about the Lip conflict made by Carole Roussopoulos in August 1973. The first documentary features scenes of workers sharing their perspectives, often without directly answering the posed questions. One notable figure is Monique Piton, who articulates her views on the conflict with enthusiasm and clarity. She recounts the events surrounding the occupation of the factory by the police, the four months of struggle, the role of women in the movement, and her criticisms of the media's portrayal of the situation. The second documentary revisits the Lip march that took place on September 29, 1973, using period footage to document the event. From the outset of the occupation, various militant groups, including ScopeColor, Roger Louis's team, and the Medvedkine groups, captured the workers' struggle on film, alongside Roussopoulos's contributions. To address political and union divisions, Chris Marker intervened to edit this militant documentary, compiling footage shot by others within a week to ensure its release in early September 1973, aimed at mobilizing support for the upcoming demonstration. The film chronicles the conflict in a chronological manner and serves more as an agitprop tool than as a product of in-depth analysis.

==== Lip ou le Goût du Collectif ====
Lip ou le Goût du Collectif, directed by Dominique Dubosc, is a documentary that explores the story of the Lip watch factory in Besançon, France, and the workers' struggle during the 1970s. The film provides a detailed account of the factory's history, focusing on the events surrounding its workers' uprising in 1973 when they occupied the factory to protest against layoffs and poor working conditions.

==== Les Lip, l'imagination au pouvoir ====
Les Lip, l'imagination au pouvoir is a documentary directed by Christian Rouaud, released in 2007. It presents the Lip affair and its events through the testimonies of key figures from that era, presented in a historical, social, and political context, supplemented by archival footage. Acclaimed by critics for its thoughtful concept and neutrality, the film pays tribute to this significant struggle and seeks to preserve this chapter of history for younger generations.

==== Fils de Lip ====
Fils de Lip is a documentary film directed by Thomas Faverjon in 2007, which recounts the second Lip conflict through the perspectives of those who were often overlooked—the "voiceless." This film highlights the new Lip struggle in a company that had declared bankruptcy but remained profitable in terms of machinery and workforce. Despite its viability, no buyers showed interest, largely due to the economic and political elite of the time, who sought to undermine the legacy of the earlier revolution. This documentary offers a fresh perspective on the employees, portraying their experiences not as a continuation of a glorious movement but as a confrontation with harsh repression.

==== L'été des Lip (TV film, France 3, 2011) ====
L'été des Lip is a film by Dominique Ladoge retracing the great Lip strike. Through the eyes of a 20-year-old employee named Tulipe, the daughter of an Italian immigrant, we revisit the greatest moments of the 1970s struggle.

=== Songs ===
- "A Besançon", on Jacques Bertin's album of the same name, released by Disques Alvarès in 1974. The song captures the spirit of the time and reflects the cultural and social atmosphere surrounding the events in Besançon, particularly in the context of the Lip conflict. Bertin's work contributes to the musical narrative of this pivotal moment in history.

=== Radio programs ===
- Là-bas si j'y suis, France Inter: October 11, 2004, November 21, 2013, November 25, 2013
- Affaires sensibles, France Inter: September 23, 2014

=== Comic strips ===
- Wiaz and Piotr, Les Hors-la-loi de Palente – La grève des Lip, Société Internationale d'Édition, 1974;
- Laurent Galandon, Damien Vidal, Lip: Des héros ordinaires, Dargaud, 2014.

=== Board games ===
- Chomageopoly is a board game created by the workers of the Lip watch factory during their struggle in the 1970s. It is a satirical take on the classic Monopoly game, but instead of focusing on capitalism and property accumulation, it highlights themes of unemployment, worker solidarity, and the challenges faced by labor movements.

== See also ==
- History of clockmaking in Besançon
- Workers' self-management
- Self-organization
- Besançon Commune

== Bibliography ==
=== Testimonies ===
- Barbier, Josette; Burgy, Raymond; Burtz, Jacky. Lip: Affaire non classée. Paris: Syros. p. 237. OCLC 490817924.
- Piton, Monique (1975). C'est possible! : Le récit de ce que j'ai éprouvé durant cette lutte de Lip. Paris: Éditions des femmes. p. 621. ISBN 978-2-721-00014-9. OCLC 1960061.
- Piton, Monique (2010). Mémoires libres. Paris: Éd. Syllepse. p. 238. ISBN 978-2-849-50255-6. OCLC 690358667.
- Féret, Dominique (1998). Les Yeux rouges. Besançon: Les Solitaires intempestifs Nouveau théâtre de Besançon. p. 76. ISBN 978-2-912-46436-1. OCLC 40674765.
- Lip au féminin : rien ne se fait bien sans passion. Paris: Syros. 1977. p. 161. ISBN 978-2-901-96801-6. OCLC 461829369.
- Piaget; et al. (Réseau citoyens résistants) (2012). La Force du collectif. Entretiens avec Charles . éditions Libertalia.

=== General publications ===
- Reid, Donald (2018). Opening the Gates. The Lip Affairs. 1968–1981 [L'affaire Lip]. Translated by Chuquet, Hélène. Londres: Verso.
- de Virieu, François-Henri (1973). Lip, 100 000 montres sans patron. Paris: Calmann-Lévy. OCLC 1660169.
- Clavel, Maurice (1974). Les paroissiens de Palente; ou encore, Les murs et les hommes. Paris: B. Grasset. ISBN 978-2-246-00097-6. OCLC 1120080.
- Divo, Jean (2003). L'affaire Lip et les catholiques de Franche-Comté. Ed. Cabédita. p. 200. ISBN 978-2-882-95389-6. OCLC 496394430.
- Neveux, Olivier (2007). Théâtres en lutte. Paris: La Découverte.
- Gourgues, Guillaume (2017). "Occuper son usine et produire : stratégie de lutte ou de survie ?: La fragile politisation des occupations de l'usine Lip (1973–1977)". Politix. 117 (1): 117. doi:10.3917/pox.117.0117. ISSN 0295-2319.
