= Raoul Bleuse =

French politician

Deputy for the 49th Legislative District of the Seine
- In office Legislative Session II 25 November 1962 – 2 April 1967
- Preceded by: Michel Peytel (UNR)
- Succeeded by

Personal details
- Born: 9 September 1895 Ribemont
- Died: 8 June 1984 (aged 88) Alfortville
- Party: SFIO, PSA, PSU, SFIO

Raoul Bleuse (9 September 1895 in Ribemont – 8 June 1984 in Alfortville), was a French politician.

== Early life ==
He voluntarily enlisted in the army in October 1913, took part in World War I, and was demobilized in August 1919. In 1921 he enlisted in the police as well as the French Social-Democrat Party (SFIO). He was dismissed from the police in 1942 due to his activities in the French Resistance, then reinstated in 1945.

== Political career ==
He was elected as mayor of Alfortville from 1947 to 1965 and as general councillor in the Seine department from 1953 to 1967.

In September 1958, he joined the splinter left-wing Autonomous Socialist Party (PSA), was unsuccessfully a candidate for the 1958 legislative election, getting less than 10% of votes. In 1960, the PSA merged into the Unified Socialist Party (PSU). He was one of only two PSU candidates elected to the National Assembly after the 1962 legislative election, with François Tanguy-Prigent, even if he only got 16.6% for the first round, but the Communist candidate Roland Foucard (28.5%) stepped down between the two rounds, in order to let him win the race. He first joined the unaffiliated group of deputies, then came back to the SFIO parliamentary group in April 1963 and left it 2 years later.
