= Electronic watch =

Electronic watch may refer to:

- Electric watch, pre-quartz watches powered electronically
- Quartz watch, watches whose timekeeping element is quartz crystal
