= Bouchardeau =

Bouchardeau is a French surname. Notable people with the surname include:

- Huguette Bouchardeau (1935–2026), French novelist, biographer, essayist, publisher, and politician
- Lucien Bouchardeau (1961–2018), Nigerien football referee
