= Pierre Juquin =

French politician and trade unionist

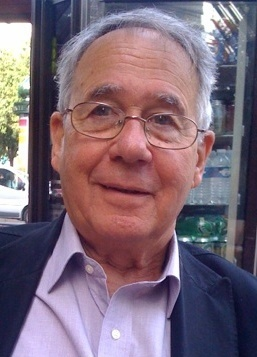

Pierre Juquin (born 22 February 1930 in Clermont-Ferrand) is a French communist politician and trade unionist.

== Early life and PCF politics ==
The son of an SNCF employee, he is a graduate of the École Normale Supérieure (ENS), and was a teacher of German at the Lycée Lakanal in Sceaux between 1959 and 1966. A classmate of Emmanuel Le Roy Ladurie (at ENS), Juquin joined the French Communist Party (PCF), and was a candidate in the municipal elections of 1959 as well as a regional leader for the PCF in Seine. A collaborator of Georges Marchais, he was admitted as observer to the PCF Central Committee, and defended the official party line inside the Union des Étudiants Communistes. He was also a prominent member of the Syndicat National des Enseignants du Second Degré (SNEF, a teachers' union, in which he helped the communists gain a decisive say).

He was elected to the French National Assembly for Essonne and, in 1967, became a full member of the PCF Central Committee. Voted out of the Essonne seat in 1968, he regained the position in 1973 - and was re-elected until 1981; an observer to the Politburo in 1979, he joined the body in 1982, and was assigned leadership of the press and propaganda bureau.

== Independent voice ==
He was excluded from the Politburo in October 1984, and publicly disagreed with decisions taken at the 25th Party Congress of February 1985. His opposition was tolerated until October 1987, when he was excluded from the Party altogether - after he had expressed his wish to run for French Presidency on his own platform.

Thus, Juquin ran in the 1988 presidential election with backing from the Unified Socialist Party (PSU) and the Revolutionary Communist League, grouping some former PCF members, Trotskyists, various Greens, and independent left-wingers. Juquin only managed to obtain 2.08% of the vote. His movement survived as the New Left for Socialism, Ecology and Self-management, which fused with the PSU to form Red and Green Alternative (nowadays known as Les Alternatifs) Juquin joined the Greens in 1991.
