= Bidegain =

- Pronunciation: Spanish pronunciation: [biˈdeɡain]
- Language: Basque

Origin
- Language: Basque
- Origin: Basque Country
- Meaning: Possibly "lower house" or derived from a place name

Other names
- Variant forms: Bidegáin, Bidegainet

Bidegain is a Basque surname, primarily found in the Basque Country of northern Spain and southwestern France. It is considered a toponymic surname, likely referring to a family's origin near a notable location or geographic feature.

== Origins ==
The surname Bidegain is believed to be derived from the Basque words bide (meaning "path" or "road") and gain (meaning "top" or "summit"), possibly signifying "top of the path" or "road summit". It has been documented in historical records in the provinces of Labourd, Lower Navarre, and Béarn since the early modern period.

== Geographical distribution ==
As of 2014, most bearers of the surname Bidegain reside in Spain, particularly in the Basque provinces, with smaller populations in France, Argentina, and Uruguay due to Basque emigration. The surname was found in USA in 1920, with Carlifornia having the highest number of Bidegain family name.

== Notable people ==
- José Bidegain (1925–1999), French Basque trade unionist and president of the Pau FC; father of Thomas Bidegain.
- Thomas Bidegain (born 1968), French screenwriter, producer and film director; son of José Bidegain.
