= Autonomous Socialist Party (France) =

Autonomous Socialist Party Parti socialiste autonome
- Abbreviation: PSA
- General Secretary: Édouard Depreux
- Founded: 11 September 1958; 67 years ago
- Dissolved: 3 April 1960; 65 years ago
- Split from: French Section of the Workers' International
- Merged into: Unified Socialist Party
- Membership (1960): 16,000
- Ideology: Democratic socialism Social-democracy
- Political position: Left-wing

The Autonomous Socialist Party (French: Parti socialiste autonome, PSA) was a splinter party from the French Section of the Workers' International (SFIO). It was founded in September 1958 in reaction against the SFIO stance on the Algerian War and its acceptance of the Gaullist May 1958 putsch. Half a dozen SFIO members of the French National Assembly and local elected officials joined the splinter party, as well as members from the (centrist) Radical Party, most notably Pierre Mendès France, former Prime Minister. None of the PSA deputies were reelected at the November 1958 legislative election. The PSA merged into the Unified Socialist Party in 1960 as one of its founding organisations.

== Members ==
- Édouard Depreux (general secretary, member of the National Assembly)
- Alain Savary (deputy general secretary, member of the National Assembly)
- Robert Verdier (deputy general secretary, member of the National Assembly)
- Raoul Bleuse
- Daniel Mayer
- Pierre Mendès France
