= Robert Chapuis =

French politician

Deputy for the 1st Legislative District of the Ardèche
- In office Legislative Sessions VII, VIII, and IX 2 July 1981 – 28 July 1988
- Preceded by: Pierre Cornet
- Succeeded by: Claude Laréal

Personal details
- Born: 7 May 1933 (age 92) Paris
- Party: Socialist

Robert Chapuis (born 7 May 1933 in Paris) is a French politician.

Chapuis served as vice-president of the National Union of Students of France (UNEF) from 1955 to April 1956, during which time he was responsible for union branches in the French overseas territories. As former head of Jeunesse Étudiante Chrétienne (JEC), a Christian student youth organization, he played a major role in the shifting post-colonial focus of the UNEF. He was the National Secretary of the Unified Socialist Party (PSU) from 26 November 1973 to 14 December 1974. His time as secretary came to an end when, alongside Michel Rocard, he defected to the Socialist Party (PS).

In 1983, he proposed a law on the creation of a parliamentary office to evaluate scientific and technological options, OPECST. During this period his parliamentary attaché was Manuel Valls.

In 1988 and 1991 during the government of Prime Minister Michel Rocard, he served as Secretary of State in the Ministry of Education, where he was responsible for technological education.

He was vice-president of the General Council of the Ardèche, mayor of the city of Teil, and the deputy parliamentary member representing the Ardèche. He is now retired from political office but still active with the PS and often comments on political issues.

== Bibliography ==
- 1976: Les chrétiens et le socialisme : témoignage et bilan ordre des choses. Calmann-Lévy. 270 p. ISBN 2702100953, ISBN 9782702100950
- 2007: Si Rocard avait su... : Témoignage sur la deuxième gauche. L'Harmattan : Paris. Coll. "Des Poings et des Roses". 246 p. ISBN 229602775X, ISBN 978-2296027756.
- 2008: La rose et la croix. Socialistes et chrétiens, L'Encyclopédie du socialisme. ISBN 2916333398, ISBN 9782916333397

== See also ==
- Unified Socialist Party (France)
- Manuel Valls
- (in French) La politique en Ardèche
- (in French) Liste de personnalités de l'UNEF
- (in French) Robert Chapuis
- (in French) Teil
