= Édouard Depreux =

French journalist and politician

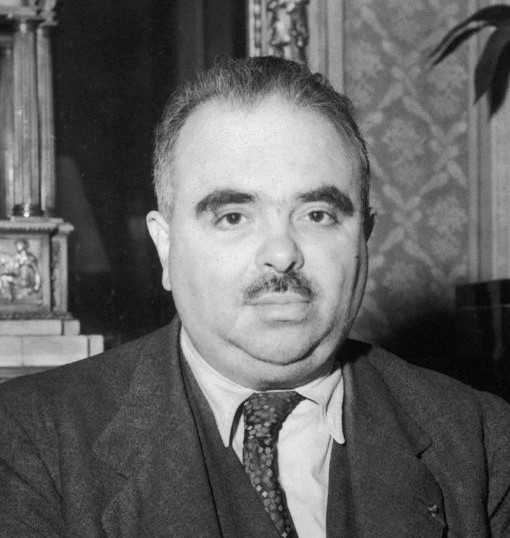
Depreux in 1946

Édouard Gustave Depreux (31 October 1898 – 16 October 1981) was a French socialist journalist, essayist, and politician of the French Fourth Republic; he was born in Viesly (département of Nord) and died in Paris.

== Early career ==
Born in Viesly, Depreux moved with his family to Sceaux, Hauts-de-Seine in 1913. A soldier in World War I, Depreux was injured in a gas attack, and was subsequently awarded the Croix de Guerre. He joined the Section Française de l'Internationale Ouvrière (SFIO) at age 20, being influenced by the ideas of Jean Jaurès and Jean Longuet; he studied Philosophy, Law, and Humanities, before becoming a lawyer.

After serving as a member of the Sceaux commune council in 1935, and as a council member for Seine (1938–1941), he joined the French Resistance in the fight against the Nazi German military occupation, and held a high-ranking position in the SFIO executive committee, being the editor of the illegal newspaper Le Populaire. He briefly served as the Commissioner of the Republic for Toulouse. After the liberation of Paris, Depreux became mayor of Sceaux (a position he would hold until 1959), and a member of the Provisional Consultative Assembly that served as the legislature of France prior to the creation of the Fourth Republic; he then was elected to the French Parliament for successive terms between 1946 and 1958.

== As Minister and PSU leader ==
A Minister of the Interior between 24 June 1946 and 24 November 1947 (in the Ministries of Georges Bidault, Léon Blum, and Paul Ramadier), he imposed the voting of an Organic Statute of Algeria, confirming partial autonomy for the colony of Algeria. In 1947, he revealed the existence of an American-sponsored secret "stay-behind army" in France codenamed Plan Bleu.

He was Minister of Education in Robert Schuman's first cabinet (February–July 1948). Hostile to the European Defence Community plan proposed by René Pleven, and highly critical of the colonialism accommodated by the SFIO, Depreux nonetheless led the Party's group in the French National Assembly on two occasions.

At the same time, he became an opponent of Charles de Gaulle and Gaullism, and declared his dissatisfaction with the proclamation of the Fifth Republic. Édouard Depreux left the SFIO to enter the new Autonomous Socialist Party (PSA), and then the Unified Socialist Party (PSU, created by a merger between the PSA and other groups), serving as its national secretary between 1960 and 1967.

== Works ==
- Renouveau du socialisme, Calmann-Lévy, 1960
- La nouvelle Chine et son héritage, Editions du Burin, 1967
- Souvenir d'un militant, de la social-démocratie au socialisme, Fayard, 1972
- Servitude et grandeur du PSU, Editions Syros, 1974
- Comment j'ai pu, en décembre 1941, sous l'occupation nazie, dire non à Pétain et à Hitler, Presses de l'Atelier Graphique, Reims 1979

== See also ==
- Nationalism and resistance in Algeria
- Operation Gladio

Preceded by André Le Troquer	Minister of the Interior; 1946–1947	Succeeded by Jules Moch
Preceded by Marcel-Edmond Naegelen	Minister of National Education; 1948	Succeeded by Yvon Delbos
