= Jean Geney =

French politician (1939–2026)

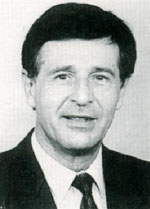
- Geney in 1994

Deputy of the French National Assembly for Doubs's 4th constituency
- In office 2 April 1993 – 21 April 1997
- Preceded by: Huguette Bouchardeau
- Succeeded by: Pierre Moscovici

Mayor of Étupes
- In office 20 March 1989 – 22 October 2010
- Preceded by: Paul Bernard
- Succeeded by: Catherine Dessables

Member of the Departmental Council of Doubs of Canton of Étupes
- In office 17 March 1985 – 28 March 2004
- Preceded by: Michel Rondot
- Succeeded by: Michel Rondot

Personal details
- Born: 26 September 1939 Mélisey, France
- Died: 9 October 2026 (aged 87)
- Party: RPR
- Occupation: Automotive technician

Jean Geney (French: [ʒˈɑ̃ ʒənˈɛ]; 26 September 1939 – 9 October 2026) was a French politician of the Rally for the Republic (RPR).

Geney served in the National Assembly from 1993 to 1997 and was mayor of Étupes from 1989 until his resignation in 2010.

Geney died on 9 October 2026, at the age of 87.
