= Jean-Claude Sensemat =

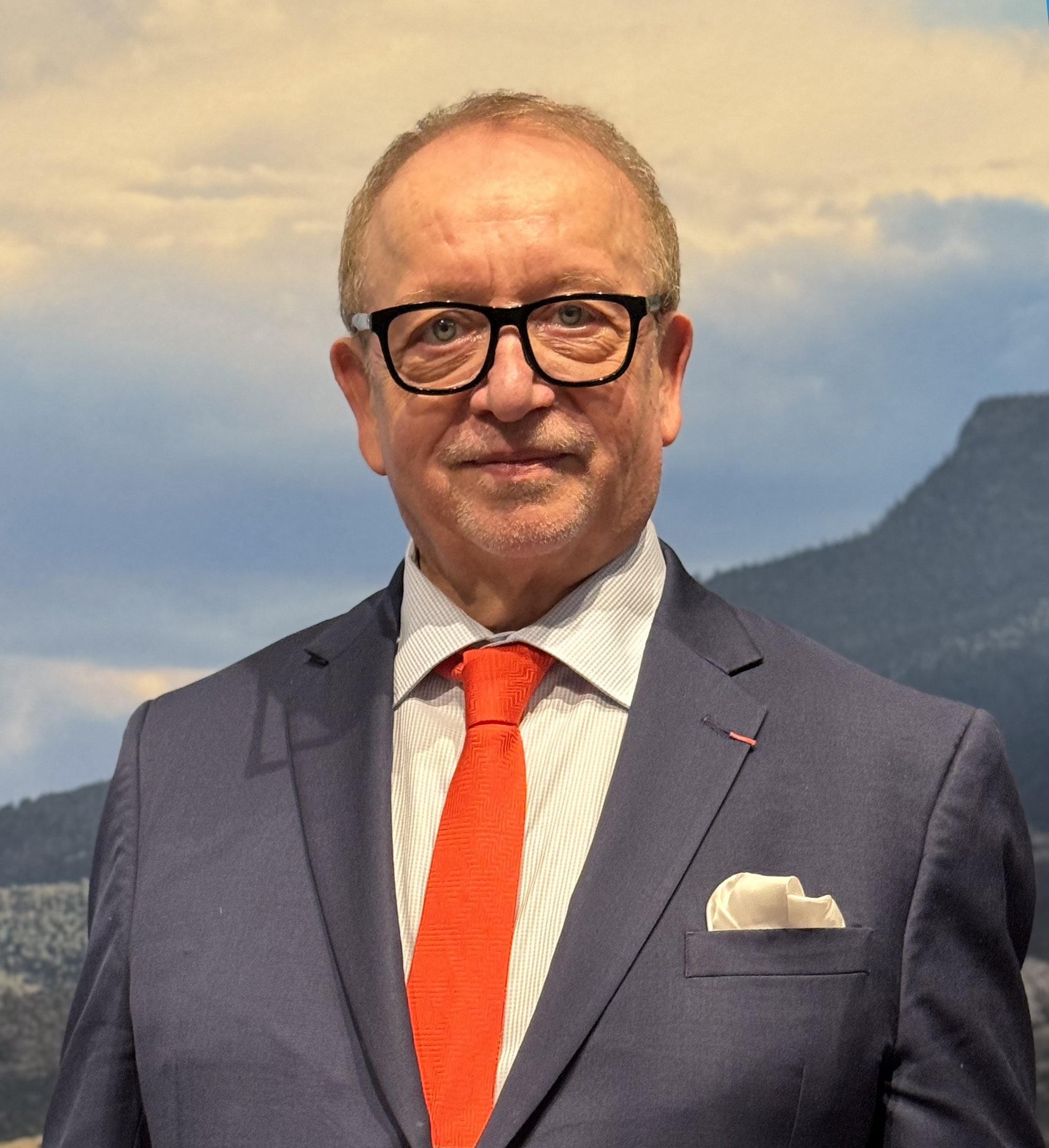
- Jean-Claude SENSEMAT in Montreal (Canada)

Jean-Claude Sensemat (born April 14, 1951 in Fleurance) is a French and Canadian businessman.

== Career ==
=== 1970 to 2001 ===
From 1970 to 2000, he founded and directed an import/export group of hand and power tool companies that bears his name. The Groupe Sensemat became the largest private employer(Source: INSEE, page 106) of the Gers with over 500 collaborators in 1999 and sales totaling 800 million French francs (122 M Euros). The company’s growth is owed to the globalization of trade. As early as 1975, import-export operations were organized with India, China, Romania, Albania and other countries of the Eastern bloc, sometimes using barter and compensation. The Groupe Sensemat became a privileged supplier of the European major hypermarket retailers. Through his tool-manufacturing group, he then acquired many brownfields in the department of the Gers (the Grundig Factory, the Seita buildings, etc.).

He structured his tooling group with subsidiaries abroad, notably including Atlas Tools (Hong Kong), Sensemat Asia (Taipei – Taiwan), Sensemat Ibérica (Madrid - Spain), Sensemat Portugal (Lisbon), Sensemat Benelux (Brussels), Sensemat Asia (Hong Kong).

In 1989, as a major player in the department’s economic life, he was a counselor with the Gers’ Bank of France for 6 years. He was Vice President of the Gers’ Employers' Union in 1989, and he founded the Gers’ UNICEF committee in 1988. He also founded a local newspaper: "La Gascogne".

In 1990, he purchased LIP, the renowned watchmaking company that was then in difficulty, and relaunched it. Then, in 1992 he acquired other brands: Achille Zavatta, Teppaz, and Luis Ocaña. In 2000, his strongly coveted hand and power tool group faced problems leading to the lifetime dismissal of a court administrator who was found guilty and imprisoned. The Sensemat Group disappeared.

Between 1991 and 2007, he was Foreign Trade Advisor for France.

In 1997, Jean-Claude Sensemat prepared for the introduction into the stock exchange on the second market for his tooling group with Crédit Agricole and Europe Finance et Industrie (EFI), Louis Thannberger.

=== 2002 to 2024 ===
In 2002, he transferred the LIP brand international license to the Gersoise company MGH of Lectoure. That same year, he was named Honorary Consul of the Republic of Albania for thirty-three French departments. He conducted his business from his company based in Toulouse.

In 2007, he immigrated to Canada with his family. He founded a financial and real estate management company, Gestion Geneen Inc., in Montreal. He established a financial trust and traded his securities on the New York and Toronto stock exchanges. He created a real estate portfolio in Montreal, managed by his company.

In 2013, he created the Editions Duroi in Quebec, Canada.

In 2016, the French businessman, Canadian citizen since 2015, sells the LIP brand to its licensee.

In Canada, together with Gestion Geneen Inc., Family Office of the Sensemat family, he develops and manages his luxury condominium portfolio and trades his financial assets on the Wall Street Stock Exchange and the Toronto TSX.

In 2018, he acquired stakes in a luxury business center (1188 Union) in downtown Montreal. He purchased offices there, where he established the headquarters of his company, Gestion Geneen Inc.

In 2023, he released his sixth book: Sensemat–The Pioneer (published by Editions Duroi), in which he recounts his professional travels since 1975 between India, Taiwan, China, Vietnam, and the former Soviet bloc countries, all the way to Albania under the regime of Enver Hoxha, where he becomes Consul in 2002.

In 2024, he worked on adapting his book Sensemat – The Pioneer for the screen with the use of artificial intelligence.

== Family ==
Jean-Claude Sensemat’s first marriage was to Sompong Valklayong (1955–2011). Together, they had a son, Laurent Sensemat, born in 1985, who later became his collaborator at Gestion Geneen Inc. in Canada. Laurent died in a car accident in June 2024.

In 1999, Jean-Claude Sensemat married Martine Maryvonne Rzépécki.

== Awards and honours ==
- Knight of the National Order of Merit (decree of February 26, 1989)(section 2679)
- Knight of the Legion of Honour (decree of April 3, 1996)

== Publications ==
- La Patronade, éditions Olivier Orban, 1988.
- Un Moment de Gascogne, éditions La Gascogne, 1997.
- Le Délit d'Entreprendre, éditions de la Mezzanine, 2004.
- Comment j'ai sauvé LIP, éditions Entreprendre Robert Lafont, 2005.
- France you betrayed me, éditions Duroi, 2013
- Sensemat - The Pioneer, éditions Duroi, 2023

== Press - Director of Publications ==
=== 2004-2006 ===
Toulouse Capitale: Toulouse and Midi-Pyrénées information journal / [publ. dir. Jean-Claude Sensemat] "Toulouse Capitale"

== Periodicals and Collections ==
=== 1999-2000 ===
Le Capitole: quarterly information journal / [publ. dir. J.-C. Sensemat] Ed. La Gascogne

=== 1995-2000 ===
La Gascogne: bimonthly information journal / [dir. publ. J.-C. Sensemat] La Gascogne
