= Alter-globalization =

Advocacy for globalization models prioritizing human rights, environment, and fairness

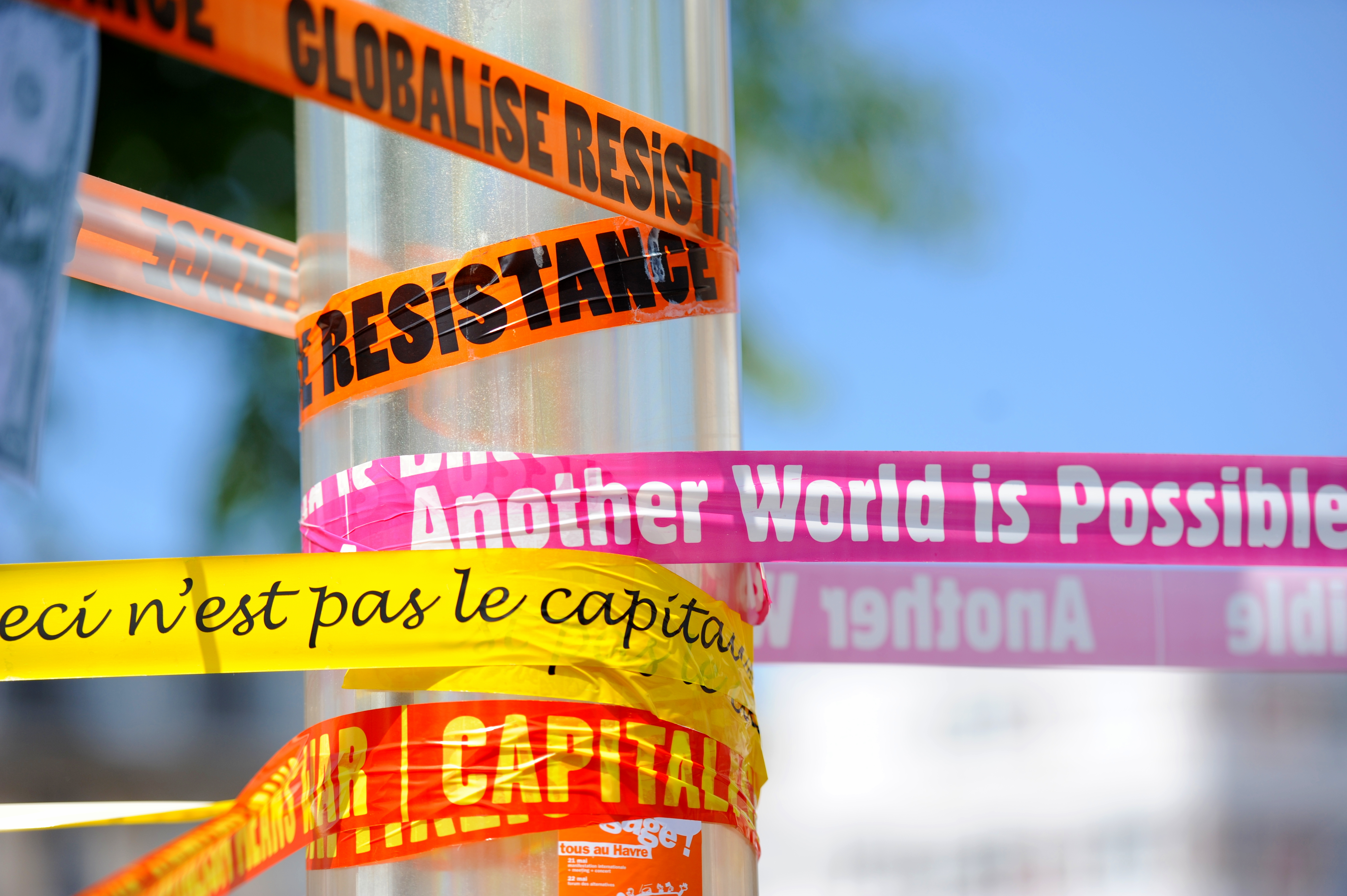
Alter-globalization slogans during the 2011 protests in Le Havre against the 37th G8 summit in Deauville, France

Alter-globalization (also known as alter-globo, alternative globalization or alter-mundialization — from the French: alter-mondialisation) is a social movement whose proponents support global cooperation and interaction, but oppose what they describe as the negative effects of economic globalization, considering it to often work to the detriment of, or to not adequately promote, human values such as environmental and climate protection, economic justice, labor protection, protection of indigenous cultures, peace and civil liberties. The movement is related to the global justice movement.

The name may have been derived from a popular slogan of the movement, namely "another world is possible," which came out of the World Social Forum. The alter-globalization movement is a cooperative movement designed to "protest the direction and perceived negative economic, political, social, cultural and ecological consequences of neoliberal globalization". Many alter-globalists seek to avoid the "disestablishment of local economies and disastrous humanitarian consequences". Most members of this movement shun the label "anti-globalization" as pejorative and incorrect since they actively support human activity on a global scale and do not oppose economic globalization per se.

Proponents view the movement as an alternative to what they term "neoliberal globalization" in which international institutions (the World Trade Organization, World Bank, International Monetary Fund and the like) and major corporations devote themselves to enriching the developed world while giving little or no attention to what critics say are the detrimental effects of their actions on the people and environments of less developed countries, countries whose governments are often too weak or too corrupt to resist or regulate them. This is not to be confused with proletarian internationalism as put forth by communists in that alter-globalists do not necessarily oppose the free market, but a subset of free-market practices characterized by certain business attitudes and political policies that they say often lead to violations of human rights.

== History ==
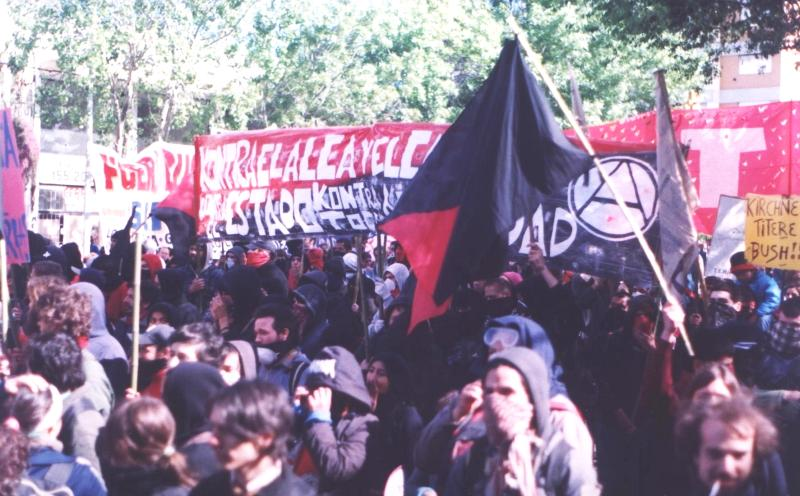
Anarchist protest against capitalist neo-liberalism, Argentina

The 1970s saw resistance to global expansion by both government and non-government parties. U.S. Senator Frank Church was concerned with the role multinational corporations were beginning to play in global trade and created a subcommittee that reviewed corporate practices to see if they were advancing U.S. interests or not (i.e. exporting jobs that could be kept within the United States). The results prompted some countries in the Global South (ranging from Tanzania to the Philippines) to call for rules and collective action that would raise or stabilize raw material prices and increase Southern exports.

The World Trade Organization Ministerial Conference of 1999 brought significant attention to the outcry against neoliberal economic integration through media coverage, support groups, and activists. Though this opposition first became highly popularized in the 1999 Seattle WTO protests, it can be traced back prior to the 1980s when the Washington Consensus became a dominant development in thinking and policymaking.

== Issues and activities ==
Alter-globalization activists fight for better treatment of developing countries and their economies, workers' rights, fair trade, and equal human rights. They oppose the exploitation of labor, outsourcing of jobs to foreign nations (though some argue this is a nationalistic rather than alter-globalist motive), pollution of local environments, and harm to foreign cultures to which jobs are outsourced.

Aspects of the movement include:

1. Attempts at an alter-globalization movement to reform policies and processes of the WTO include: "alternative principles of public accountability, the rights of people and the protection of the environment" through the theoretical framework of Robert Cox.
2. Labor movement and trade union initiatives have begun to respond to economic and political globalisation by extending their cooperation and initiatives to the transnational level.
3. Fair trade initiatives, corporate codes of conduct, and social clauses as well as a return to local markets instead of relying too heavily on global markets.
4. "Alter-globalization activists have promoted alternative water governance models through North-South red-green alliances between organized labor, environmental groups, women's groups, and indigenous groups" (spoken in response to the increase in privatization of the global water supply).
5. "The first current of the alter-globalization movement considers that instead of getting involved in a global movement and international forums, the path to social change lies through giving life to horizontal, participatory, convivial and sustainable values in daily practices, personal life and local spaces. Many urban activists cite the way that, for example, the Zapatistas in Mexico and other Latin American indigenous movements now focus on developing communities' local autonomy via participatory self-government, autonomous education systems and improving the quality of life. They appreciate too, the convivial aspect of local initiatives and their promise of small but real alternatives to corporate globalization and mass consumption."

=== Groups and conferences ===
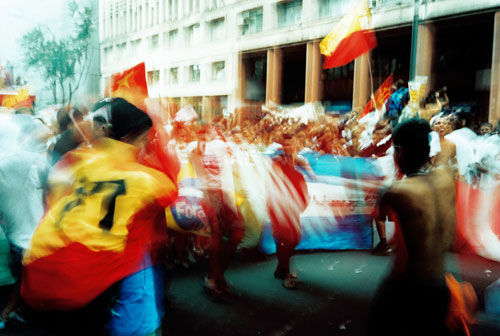
Opening walk of 2002 World Social Forum, held by participants in the movement

Advocates of alter-globalization have set up an online global news network, the Independent Media Center, to report on developments pertinent to the movement. Groups in favor of alter-globalization include ATTAC, an international trade reform network headquartered in France.

The largest forum for alter-globalization activity is the annual World Social Forum, organized as a democratic space reflecting the movement's values.

== See also ==
- Alternative movement
- Anarchism
- Anarchist communism
- Anti-capitalism
- Anti-globalization movement
- Autonomia
- Communism
- Democratic mundialization
- Direct democracy
- Global citizens movement
- Global justice movement
- Horizontalidad
- Left-wing antiglobalism
- Mundialization
- New International Economic Order
- Popular sovereignty
- Socialism
- Socialism of the 21st century
- Trade justice
- Trade Justice Movement
- Transformation of culture
