= Huguette Bouchardeau =

French politician and writer (1935–2026)

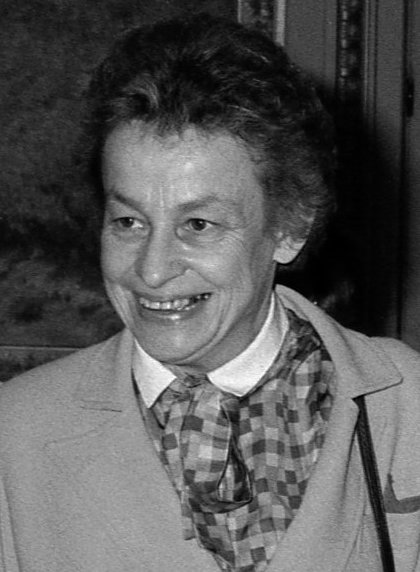
- Bouchardeau in 1985

Member of the National Assembly
- In office 23 June 1988 – 1 April 1993
- Election: 12 June 1988
- National Assembly: 9th (Fifth Republic)
- Preceded by: Constituency established
- Succeeded by: Jean Geney
- Parliamentary group: App. SOC
- Constituency: Doubs's 4th
- In office 2 April 1986 – 14 May 1988
- Election: 16 March 1986
- National Assembly: 8th (Fifth Republic)
- Parliamentary group: App. SOC
- Constituency: Doubs

Minister of the Environment
- In office 17 July 1984 – 20 March 1986
- President: François Mitterrand
- Prime Minister: Laurent Fabius
- Government: Fabius
- Preceded by: Herself (Secretary of State)
- Succeeded by: Alain Carignon

Secretary of State for the Environment and Way of Life
- In office 22 March 1983 – 17 July 1984
- President: François Mitterrand
- Prime Minister: Pierre Mauroy
- Government: Mauroy III
- Preceded by: Michel Crépeau
- Succeeded by: Herself (Minister)

National Secretary of the Unified Socialist Party
- In office 1979–1981
- Preceded by: Michel Mousel
- Succeeded by: Jacques Salvator

Mayor of Aigues-Vives
- In office 11 June 1995 – 18 March 2001
- Preceded by: Simone Mouyren
- Succeeded by: Jacky Rey

Personal details
- Born: Huguette Briaut; 1 June 1935 Saint-Étienne, Loire, France
- Died: 18 May 2026 (aged 90) Paris, France
- Party: Unified Socialist Party

Huguette Bouchardeau (1 June 1935 – 18 May 2026) was a French socialist politician, as well as a publisher (founder of HB Éditions), novelist, essayist, and biographer.

== Life and career ==
Bouchardeau was born in Saint-Étienne, Loire, France on 1 June 1935. She was a candidate of the Unified Socialist Party (PSU) in the 1981 presidential election, receiving 1.1% of the vote, and National Secretary of the Party between 1979 and 1981. Bouchardeau also served as Minister of the Environment and Way of Life in the French Socialist Party-led cabinets of Pierre Mauroy (1981–1984) and Laurent Fabius (1984–1986).

Bouchardeau died in Paris on 18 May 2026, at the age of 90.

== Selected works ==
- La famille Renoir, 2004
- La grande verrière, 1991
- Le déjeuner, 1998
- Le ministère du possible, 1986
- Les roches rouges: Portrait d'un père, 1997
- Leur père notre père, 1996
- Mes nuits avec Descartes, 2002
- Nathalie Sarraute, 2003
- Pas d'histoire, les femmes, 1977
- Rose Noël, 1992
- Simone Weil, 1995
- Tout le possible, 1981
- Une institurion : La philo. dans l'enseignement du 2ème degré en France 1900–1972, 1975
- Un coin dans leur monde,1980

== Honors and awards ==
Officer of the Order of Legion of Honour
