= Electric watch =

1st generation electrically-powered wristwatch

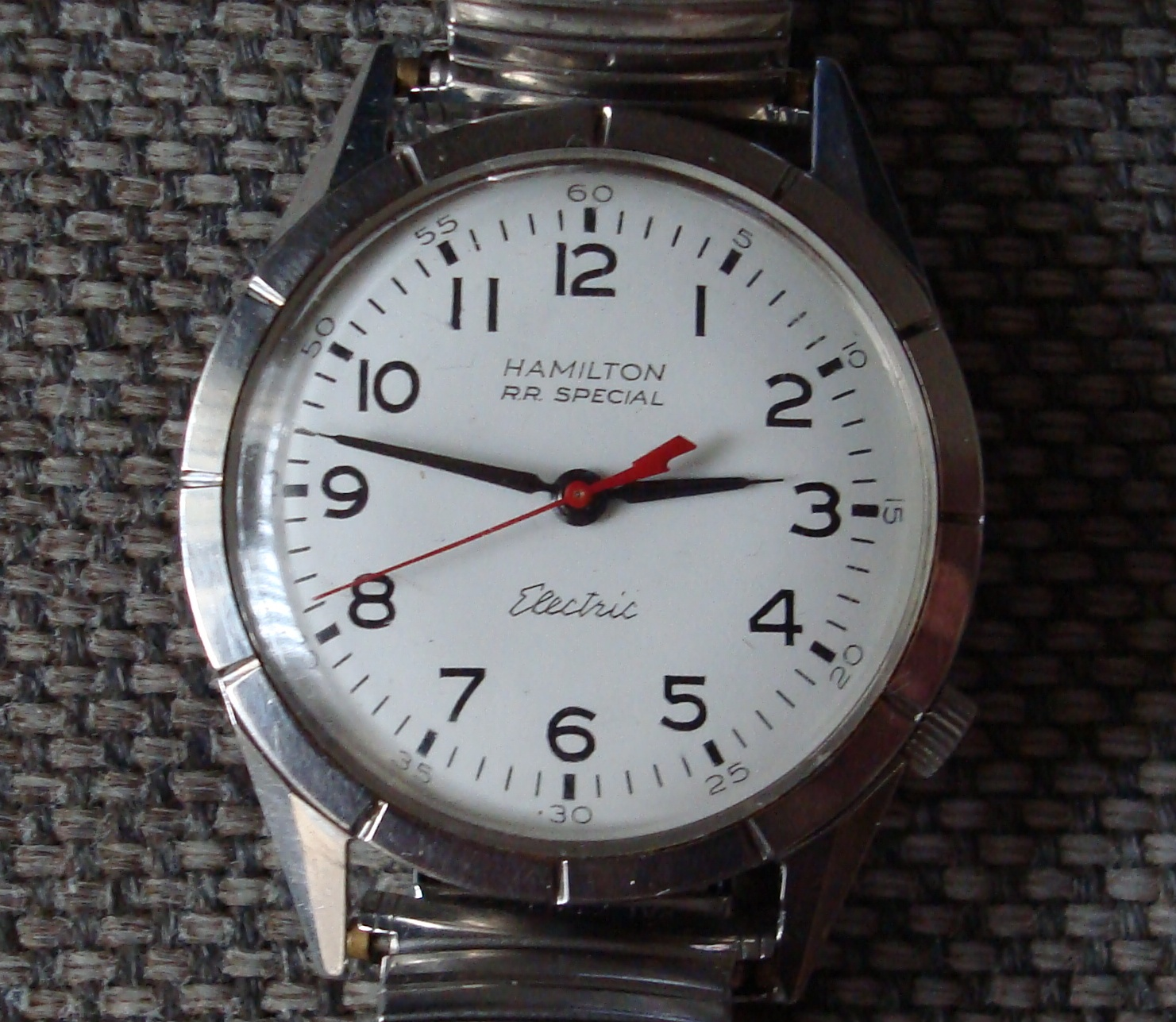
Hamilton electric watch. This model has a Hamilton caliber 505 (Moving coil system, contact controlled)

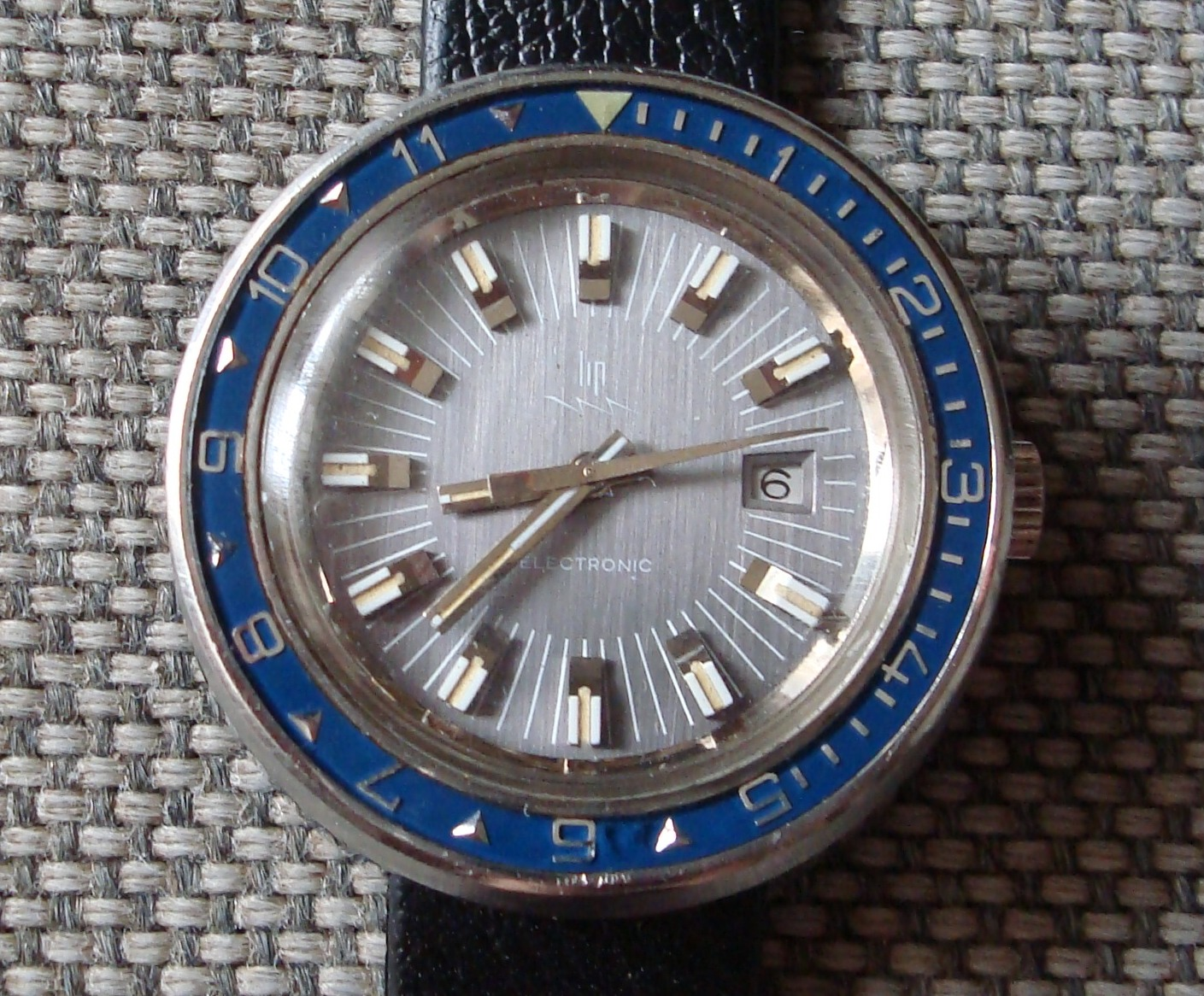
Lip electronic watch, caliber LIP R 184 (Fixed coil system, contact controlled)

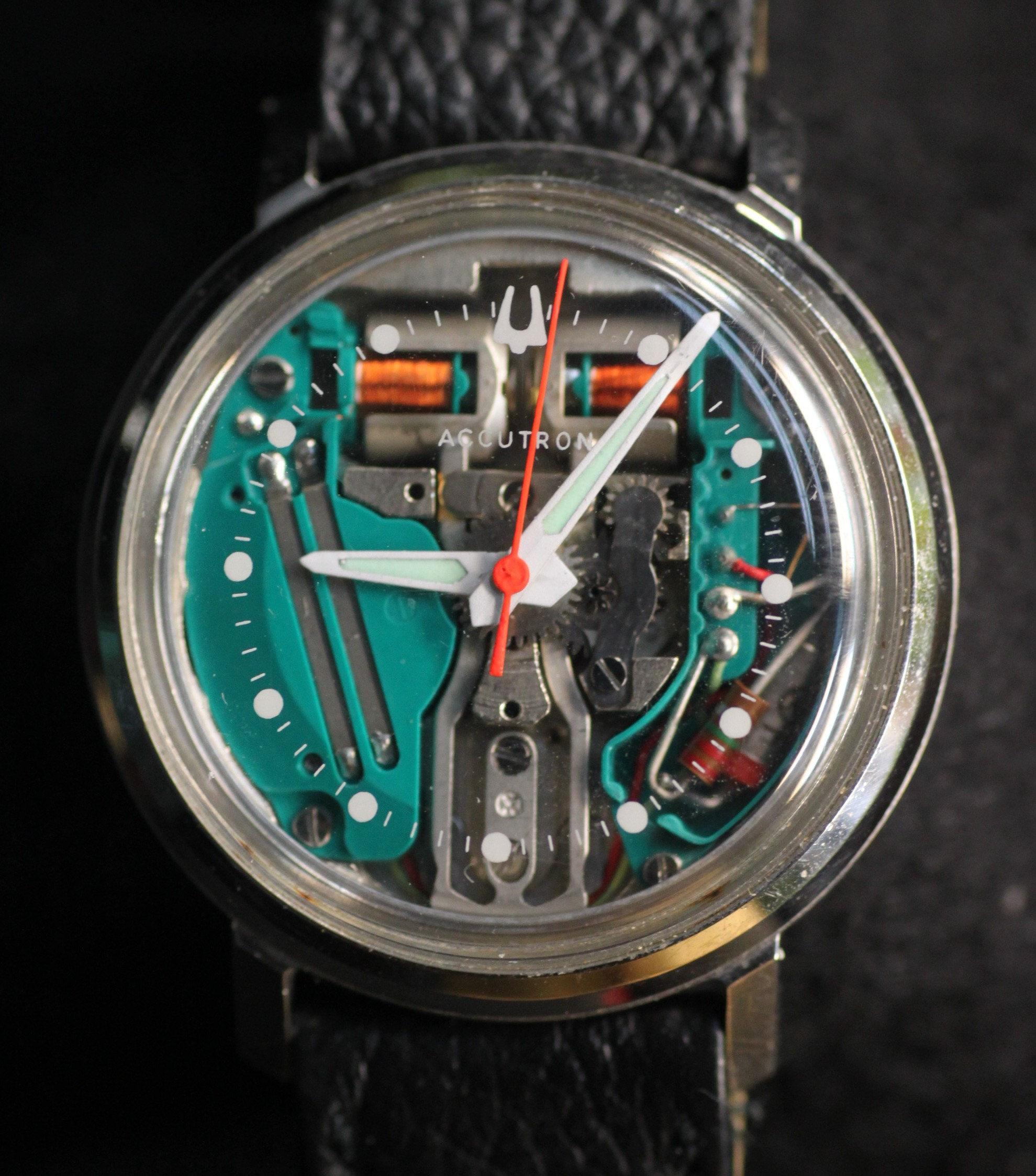
Bulova Accutron Spaceview (electronic with tuning fork) 1967

In horology, the term electric watch is used for the first-generation electrically-powered wristwatches which were first publicly displayed by both Elgin National Watch Company and Lip on March 19, 1952, with working laboratory examples in Chicago and Paris. The Hamilton Watch Company was the first to produce and retail an electric watch, from 1957. The timekeeping element of these watches was either a traditional balance wheel or a tuning fork, driven by an electro-mechanical solenoid powered by a small battery. The hands were driven mechanically through a wheel train. Electro-mechanical watches were superseded by quartz watches, which were more accurate and more durable, with fewer parts, starting with the Astron battery-powered watch with quartz crystal-controlled movement introduced by Seiko in 1969.

== Weaknesses ==
A weak point in early balance wheel electric watches were the switch contacts on the balance wheel, which turned the solenoid on briefly to provide the impulse to keep the wheel oscillating. These wore out and did not operate reliably. Later designs used electromagnetic sensing, with a transistor in the circuit to turn the solenoid on.

== Types of electric watches ==
- Moving coil system, contact controlled: refers to watches with a balance wheel with integrated coil, fixed magnets and mechanical contacts. Examples of this technology are Hamilton 500 (first retail electric watch in 1957), Epperlein 100, Champion (Ruhla / UMF), Slava 114ChN and Timex M40.
- Fixed coil system, contact controlled: watches with a piece of refined iron attached to the balance wheel, a fixed coil and mechanical contacts. In order to extend the life of the watch, some of these movements included a diode to minimize sparking on the contacts. Examples of this technology are Lip electronic R 27, LIP R 148, Elgin electronic 722, 725, 910 which were the smallest electro-mechanical movements ever made and Landeron (ESA - Ebauches S.A.) 4750.
- Transistorized watches with balance: had a balance wheel, a transistor acting as a switch and no mechanical contacts. Usually the coil was located in the base plate and the magnets are on the balance wheel. Watches using this technology include Timex M87/Laco 882, Citizen X-8 series and Seiko Electronic 31A. Another common example is ESA Dynotron cal. 9150.
- Tuning fork watches: Instead of a balance wheel, these watches used a tuning fork driven by a solenoid powered by a one-transistor oscillator circuit and no mechanical contacts. The tuning fork had an attached pawl and 'index wheel', which turned the gear train. The common frequencies used in watches were 300 Hz (ESA MOSABA cal. 9162, 9164 and 9210), 360 Hz (Bulova Accutron cal. 214 and 218), Slava Transistor, Tianjin 'Yinchabiao', Prim Elton, 480 Hz (Bulova Accutron cal. 2300) and 720 Hz (Omega Megasonic cal. 1220 and 1230). Omega F300Hz and Speedsonics series are common examples of ESA MOSABA based watches.

== See also ==
- Braille watch
- Electric clock
