= Alternative Party =

Alternative Party may refer to:

- Alternative Party (demo party), a demo art party
- Alternative Party (Armenia), a political party
- Alternative Party (Turkey), a political party
- Alternative (political bloc), a political alliance in Moldova
