= LIP (company) =

French watchmaking and clockmaking company

LIP is a French watch and clock company whose turmoil became emblematic of the conflicts between workers and capital in France.

The LIP factory, based in Besançon in eastern France, began to experience financial problems in the late 1960s and early 1970s, and management decided to attempt a factory shutdown. However, after strikes and a highly publicized factory occupation in 1973, LIP became worker-managed. All the fired employees were rehired by March 1974, but the firm was liquidated again in the spring of 1976. This led to a new struggle, called "the social conflict of the 1970s" by the daily newspaper Libération.

Confédération Française Démocratique du Travail (CFDT) union leader Charles Piaget led the strike. The Unified Socialist Party (PSU), which included former Radical Pierre Mendès-France, was then in favor of autogestion (workers' self-management).

== History ==
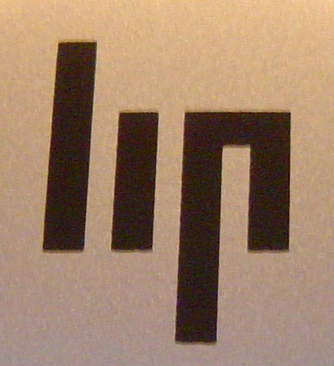
LIP brand

In 1807, the Jewish community of Besançon offered a mechanical pocket watch to Napoleon. Sixty years later, Emmanuel Lipman and his sons founded a clockwork workshop under the name of Comptoir Lipmann. In 1893 it became the Société Anonyme d'Horlogerie Lipmann Frères (Lipmann Brothers Clock Factory).

The firm launched the Lip stopwatch in 1896. Thereafter Lip became the brand name of the company. They built approximately 2,500 pieces per year. The company launched the first electronic watch in 1952, called "Electronic" (considered "electronic" rather than electric due to the presence of a diode). The first 'Electronic' models were worn by Charles de Gaulle and U.S. President Dwight D. Eisenhower; while previously in 1948, LIP's iconic T18 model was offered to Winston Churchill.

However, in the 1960s, this highly specialized company began to have financial troubles. Fred Lipmann, who changed his name to Fred Lip, took the company public in 1967, and Ebauches S.A. (subsidiary of ASUAG, a large Swiss consortium which later became Swatch) took 33% of the shares.

Meanwhile, workers started organizing to improve labor conditions. This proved difficult. Charles Piaget, the son of a clockwork artisan, who began working at the factory in 1946 as a skilled worker, became a representative of the Confédération Française des Travailleurs Chrétiens (CFTC, French Confederation of Christian Workers) trade union. He later recalled that during national strikes, only 30 or 40 workers at LIP out of a total of 1200 would go on strike. Those who did strike were listed by the management and called in to explain themselves. Semi-skilled workers on the assembly line were not allowed to talk or move more than 25 centimeters (less than ten inches) during their shifts.

In 1964, the CFTC became the CFDT, a secular trade union. Piaget participated in some meetings of the ACO (Action Catholique Ouvrière, Workers' Catholic Action), and then joined the Union de la gauche socialiste (UGS, Union of the Socialist Left) during the Algerian War (1954–62). The UGS later merged with other organizations to form the Unified Socialist Party (PSU), which included Pierre Mendès-France, a popular left-wing figure who had been President of the Council during the Fourth Republic. During the nationwide unrest of May 1968, the workers at LIP voted to join the general strike.

Fred Lip tried to smooth down the growing discontent. He spoke to the union workers of taylorism (scientific management), and proposed to increase the number of representatives on the comité d'entreprise (works council, the workers' representation in the factory), in order to have younger representatives. Although this was illegal, the union workers agreed, and elections were organized. Although Fred Lip had believed this would allow him more control of the workers, in less than a year all the young representatives joined the CFTC. Fred Lip then submitted a proposal to the inspection du travail (government labor inspection office) which would eliminate all of the sector of the company to which most of the union workers belonged, including Charles Piaget. However, he offered Piaget a promotion, naming him head of the workshop. For the next year, the workers blocked attempts to eliminate the department, opposing those who tried to move the machines out of the factory.

However, Ebauches became the biggest shareholder in 1970, taking control of 43% of the stock. Ebauches then fired 1,300 workers. The next year, the board of directors forced Fred Lip to resign, replacing him with Jacques Saint-Esprit.

LIP built the first French quartz watches in 1973 but had to face increasing competition from the United States and Japan. The firm was forced to start liquidation formalities on 17 April 1973, leading Jacques Saint-Esprit to resign on the same day.

In the following weeks, the struggles at the LIP factory drew a national audience, thus beginning one of the emblematic social conflicts of the era after May 1968. The conflict was to last several years.

== 1973: beginning of the strike and demonstrations ==
In May 1973, an Action Committee (CA, Comité d'action), influenced by the May 1968 movement, was founded. During an extraordinary works council meeting on 12 June 1973, workers stumbled upon the management's plans to restructure and downsize, which had been kept secret from them (one note said "450 à dégager", "get rid of 450"). The company then employed 1,300 workers. At first, Charles Piaget, now an official of the Confédération Française Démocratique du Travail union and active in the Unified Socialist Party (PSU), opposed a strike, preferring a slowdown, in which workers would pause for ten minutes an hour.

However, the workers were angry at the secret restructuring plan and immediately occupied the factory. On the same day, 12 June#, they took two administrators and an inspecteur du travail (government labor inspector) as hostages. The workers wanted to exchange them for "more precise information," declared Piaget (as shown in the 2007 film documentary). However, around midnight, the three hostages were quickly rescued by the CRS riot police in a violent assault. According to Piaget, this assault shocked the workers, who had been careful during previous strikes not to damage the factory in any way.

Having lost their human hostages, the workers decided to take materials hostage to block the restructuring plans. They seized 65,000 watches and hid them in various remote locations. They discussed the moral legitimacy of the action, wondering if it was a theft or a sin – Catholicism was strong in this region. But the Dominican priest and worker Jean Raguenès, who himself was close to Maoism, absolved the workers in advance.

The workers also took the plans of the factory, to avoid any risk of the competition obtaining these industrial secrets. The following day, the workers held a general assembly and decided to occupy the factory day and night.

The strike was led by Charles Piaget. Half the workers were by then affiliated with a union, either the CFDT or the CGT; most belonged to the CFDT. The leaders were mostly members of the Action Catholique Ouvrière (AOC, Workers' Catholic Action) and of popular education movements. They included Charles Piaget, Roland Vittot, Raymond Burgy, worker-priest Jean Raguenes, and an executive of the company, Michel Jeanningros. Two women, Jeannine Pierre-Emile and Fatima Demougeot, were also CFDT leaders at LIP. Noëlle Dartevelle and Claude Mercet were the Confédération générale du travail (CGT) representatives.

The workers now decided to open up the factory to outsiders, including journalists. This made them more popular. At first, Jacques Chérêque, the national leader of the CFDT metallurgist section, was wary of the Action Committee. At request of the striking workers, he sent a representative, Fredo Coutet, a metal worker, to discuss the strike with the local section of the CFTC. After a week, Coutet was convinced by his experience, but Chérêque remained wary. At that time, the workers were still skeptical about trying self-management, and requested an employer. Led by François Chérêque, the CFDT now tried to find an employer to buy the firm.

== An experience in workers' self-management (1973–74) ==
A large demonstration of 12,000 persons in the average-size town of Besançon, took place on 15 June 1973. Three days later, a general assembly of the workers decided to continue production of watches, under the workers' control, to insure "survival wages." The LIP struggle was thereafter popularized with the slogan C'est possible: on fabrique, on vend, on se paie! (It is possible: we make them, we sell them, we pay ourselves!).

The CGT-CFDT union alliance (intersyndicale) now asked the Cahiers de Mai magazine to assist them in making a newspaper dedicated to the strike. Named Lip-Unité (Lip-Unity), this newspaper would help popularize the movement. To be able to restart production at the factory, this time without an employer, they sold the watches that they had seized. In six weeks, they made the equivalent of half the revenue of a normal year. Michel Rocard, then national secretary of the PSU, took part in the sale of the watches.

"The question of women was a revolution inside the revolution," Piaget declared later. The clock factory had a majority of female workers, especially among semi-skilled workers (OS, ouvrier spécialisé) working on the assembly line.

The national leadership of the CGT union now tried to take control, calling meetings during the day against the workers' will. Finally, a large part of the members of the CGT moved to the CFDT, and the CGT decided to let them go. Despite these tensions with the leadership of the CGT, Charles Piaget later declared that the "Communists remained essential.".

Pierre Messmer's Minister of Industrial Development, Jean Charbonnel, a historic figure of left-wing Gaullism, named Henri Giraud as mediator of the conflict. The government then proposed a new plan, which included the firing of 159 employees (or 180, out of a total of 1,200.) On 3 August 1973 the workers refused this offer. Negotiations between the trade-unions, the Action Committee and the mediator Giraud started again on 11 August. Four days later, the Mobile Gendarmerie (a military unit) occupied the factory and expelled the workers. The military remained until February 1974.

After this violent occupation, many firms of Besançon and of the region decided to go on strike, and workers rushed to the LIP factory to fight the military forces. Union leaders tried to intercede to prevent any confrontation, but the government proceeded to order arrests, which led to court convictions in the following days.

On 29 September 1973 there was a national protest at Besançon; 100,000 persons demonstrated under pouring rain. The protest was nicknamed the marche des 100,000 (March of 100,000). Chérêque of the CFDT disapproved of this demonstration, fearing that the police would be provoked. An old farmer then went to see Michel Rocard and told him that he had heard, during a family meeting, a member of the special police forces boast that he had thrown Molotov cocktails and burned more cars than the May '68 demonstrators. Rocard decided to send a letter to the organizers of the demonstration, warning them. The demonstration was non-violent.

== End of the first conflict ==
Prime Minister Pierre Messmer wistfully declared on 15 October 1973: "LIP, c'est fini!" (LIP, it's over!). Behind the scenes, some progressive managers of the CNPF employers' union, including Antoine Riboud, CEO of BSN, Renaud Gillet, CEO of Rhône-Poulenc and José Bidegain, deputy president of the CNPF, tried to find a solution to the conflict. Finally, Claude Neuschwander, then number 2 at the Publicis advertising group and member of the Unified Socialist Party (PSU), agreed to become the factory's manager. LIP became a subsidiary of BSN, and Neuschwander managed to have Antoine Riboud bypass the regular control of weekly accounts.

Neuschwander advocated "the death of enterprise capitalism and the advent of finance capitalism". – or, in the words of L'Humanité, the transition from paternalistic capitalism, under Fred Lip, to modern finance capitalism

In the meanwhile, beside the PSU, all the far-left movements supported the LIP self-management experiment. LIP workers took part in the 1973-74 struggle in the Larzac against the extension of a military base (photos). However, tensions increased between the CFDT and the CGT unions.

The LIP delegation and the factory management signed the Dole agreement on 29 January 1974. The Compagnie européenne d'horlogerie (European Clockwork Co.), directed by Claude Neuschwander, took control of LIP. Neuschwander had 850 former workers rehired in March, and the strike ended. By December 1974, the conflict appeared to be finished: the workers no longer ran the factory, and all of the employees were rehired.

However, in May 1974, Valéry Giscard d'Estaing, representing free enterprise, had been elected President of France, with the support of Jacques Chirac. They opposed this union victory at a time when downsizing was happening all over France. The previous Minister of Industrial Development, Jean Charbonnel, testified that Giscard had declared: "LIP must be punished. Let them be unemployed and stay that way. Otherwise they will infect all of society." According to Charbonnel, the employers and Chirac's government had deliberately "assassinated LIP."

This was done by confronting the left-wing employer, Neuschwander, and the firm with unforeseen difficulties. Renault, a state enterprise, withdrew its orders, and the Ministry of Industry refused promised funding. In contradiction to the Dôle agreement of January 1974, the commercial court (tribunal de commerce) requested that LIP honor a debt of 6 million Francs owed by the former firm to providers.

== 1976: the second movement ==
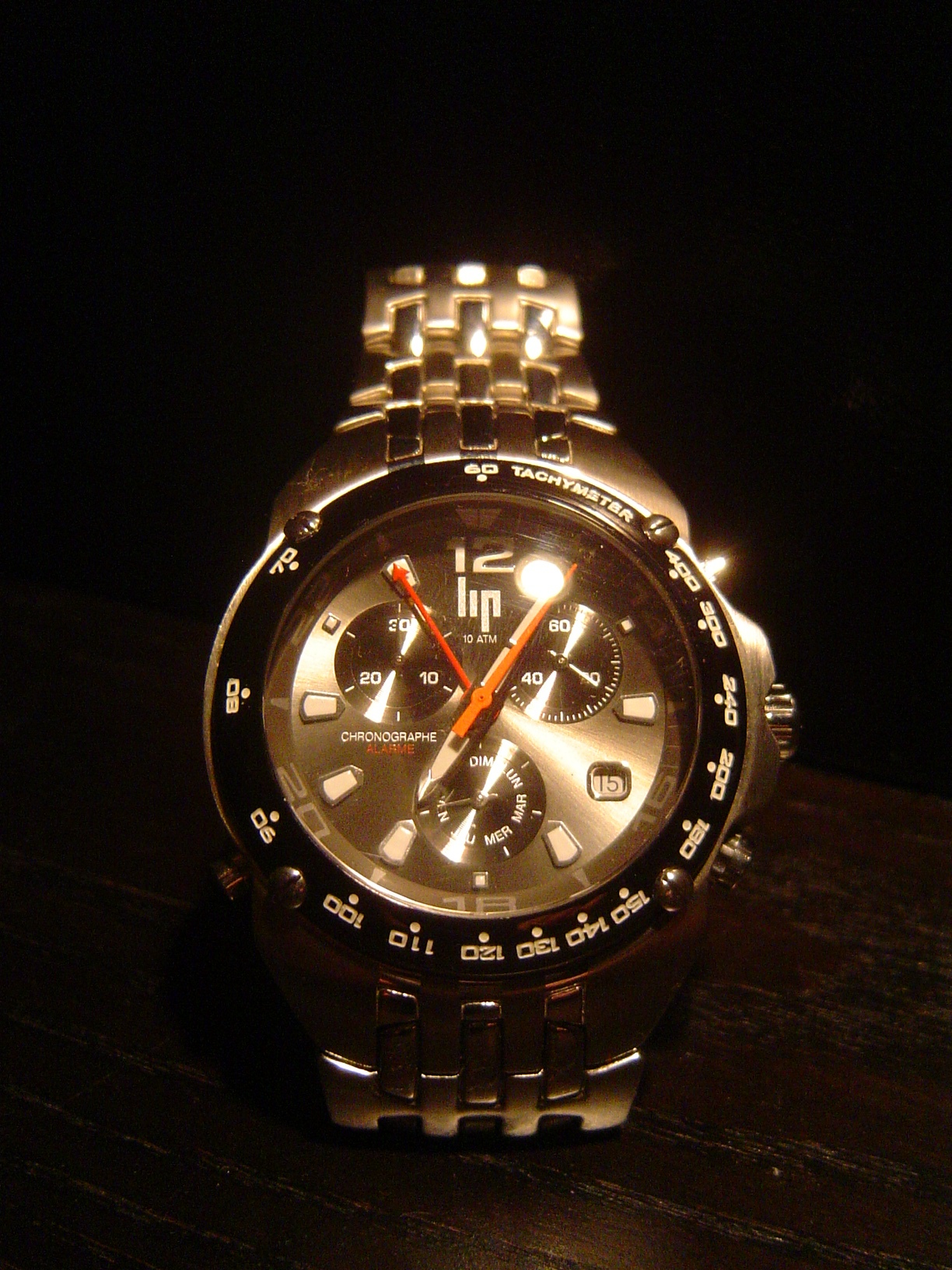

Shareholders forced Claude Neuschwander to resign on 8 February 1976 and the Compagnie européenne d'horlogerie started liquidation proceedings in April. Problems between workers and management began again. On 5 May 1976 LIP workers again occupied the factory, restarting the production of watches. Libération newspaper, founded three years before by Jean-Paul Sartre, printed the headline, "Lip, c'est reparti!" (Lip, it's starting again!). No one offered to take over LIP this time. The firm was definitively liquidated on 12 September 1977. After long internal debates, on 28 November 1977 the workers created a cooperative, named "Les Industries de Palente" (Palente's Industries) – Palente was the neighborhood of Besançon where the factory was located. The LIP acronym remained.

Charles Piaget testified in 1977, in the Quotidien de Paris, about the self-management experiment:

A few more than 500 workers are effectively in battle, gathering every day, and this, nineteen months after having been fired. It is living proof of democracy. It is impossible to have such a collective force without the sustained practice of democracy, without sharing responsibilities, and without participation of all sorts. It must be pointed out that at LIP, the workers are in charge of approximately thirty jobs, from the restaurant, which serves 300 meals a day for 4 francs, to a hairdresser for the unemployed, to a judicial commission for these same unemployed, to various artisanal activities, one being the game Chômageopoly ("Chômage" means unemployment in French), which has already sold more than 6,000 games, and finally industrial production.

The second struggle did not end until 1980, when six cooperatives, employing 250 workers out of a total of 850, were created. Most of the other workers who had joined the struggle (around 400) were either hired by the city, or signed agreements granting them early retirement. The cooperatives lasted between 3 and 12 years. Three of them, which have since become incorporated, still exist today, employing a hundred workers each. For instance, some former LIP workers returned to work in Palente with the SCOP (Société coopérative de production) cooperative Lip Précision Industrie, which employs about twenty persons. SCOP focuses on precision mechanics. According to Charles Piaget, the difficulties of the second conflict, compared to the large victory obtained in 1974, could be explained by the May 1974 election of Valéry Giscard d'Estaing, whose government decided not to help companies in a difficult situation, and by the 1973 oil crisis.

== LIP in the 1980s to the Present ==
The LIP cooperative was bought back by Kiplé in 1984, during François Mitterrand's presidency. However, the new firm was liquidated six years later. Jean-Claude Sensemat then bought the brand in 1990, and relaunched the production with modern marketing methods. The sales increased to a million watches a year. The LIP reissued Charles de Gaulle's watch, which Jean-Claude Sensemat offered to U.S. President Bill Clinton.

In 2002, Sensemat signed a LIP world license contract with Jean-Luc Bernerd, who created La Manufacture Générale Horlogère in Lectoure Gers for the occasion.

After retirement, Charles Piaget became a member of AC! (Agir ensemble contre le chômage), a union of unemployed people, while the Dominican Jean Raguenès lives in Brazil, where he supports the Landless Workers' Movement (MST). As of October 2024, the Lip company is advertising just over 100 men's watches and around 95 women's watches on its website.

== Famous models ==
- T10 (La Croix du Sud): created for Jean Mermoz's plane.
- T18: conceived by André Donat, and produced from 1933 to 1949 – a T18 was offered in 1948 to Winston Churchill.
- l'Electronic: 1952 – the first models were worn by Charles de Gaulle and U.S. President Dwight D. Eisenhower.
- Mach 2000: Conceived by Roger Tallon, the designer of the TGV high-speed train.

== See also ==
- History of clockmaking in Besançon
- List of watch manufacturers
- Electric watch
- May 68
- Workers' self-management
- Fifth Republic (France) and France in the twentieth century

== Sources ==
- Chez Lip: On fabrique; on vend; on se paye!, article in Le Monde libertaire by Maurice Joyeux (in French)
- "Lip, une mémoire ouvrière", Les Echos, 22 March 2007
- History of the brand (in English)
- Documentaire Lip, le rêve et l'histoire (Lip, the dream and the story)

== Bibliography and films ==
- Maurice Clavel, Les paroissiens de Palente, Grasset, 1974 (novel)
- Christian Rouaud, Les Lip, l'imagination au pouvoir (Lip, Imagination to Power – film documentary, 2007)
- Ch. Piaget, Lip, Postscript by Michel Rocard, Lutter Stock, 1973.
- Collective, Lip: affaire non classée, Postscript by Michel Rocard, Syros, 1975.
- Jean-Claude Sensemat, Comment j'ai sauvé Lip (How I saved Lip) (1990–2005).
