= Alternative movement =

Movement seeking limited societal change

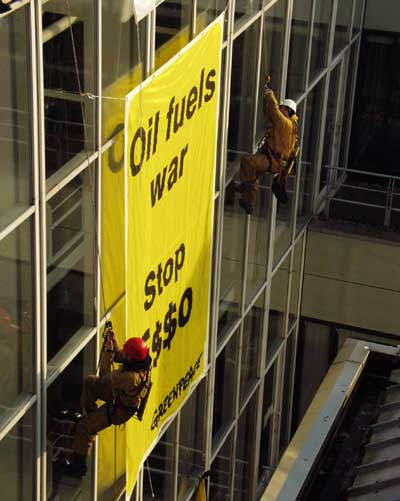
Greenpeace demonstrating against Esso. March, 6. 2003

In sociology, an alternative movement or alterative movement refers to a social movement that seeks limited societal change. They target a small group of people and a specific behavior, and attempt to change the behavior of individual people in relation to that issue.

It is one of the four main types of social movements in sociology: alternative, redemptive, reformative, and revolutionary.

Mothers Against Drunk Driving (MADD) is an example of an alternative social movement because it targets one behavior—drunk driving. Through its efforts, MADD has caused tougher drunk driving laws to be enacted, and thus changed peoples' behavior.

== See also ==
- Alter-globalization
- Environmentalism
- Redemption
- Reformism (historical)
- Revolutionary movement
- Social movement
- Victimology
