= Fine Tubes =

UK-based metal tube company

- Industry: Engineering
- Founded: 1943
- Headquarters: Plymouth, UK
- Products: Metal tubes
- Website: www.finetubes.com

Fine Tubes is a UK-based designer and manufacturer of stainless steel, nickel, zirconium, and titanium alloy tubes, based in Estover, Plymouth, Devon. These highly specialized tubes are used in oil and gas power plants, nuclear power plants, airspace and aeronautics, large scale chemical-industrial manufacturing, medical practice (including implants), and high performance liquid chromatography.

Sales for the company include: Munich, Germany; Orléans, France; New Delhi, India; and Houston, Texas. Of note, The company has supplied cooling tubes to the Large Hadron Collider at CERN.

In 2012, Fine Tubes was acquired along with its sister company, by The Watermill Group, an investment firm in the USA. It now operates as a subsidiary of Tubes Holdco Limited.
