= Green Alternative Freiburg =

Municipal political party in Germany

The Green Alternative Freiburg (German: Grüne Alternative Freiburg), GAF for short, is a local political party in the German city of Freiburg im Breisgau, which split off from The Greens in the City Council in 2008.

== Formation ==
The city councilors Monika Stein and Coinneach McCabe justified their decision to leave the party with the "no longer existing mutual respect" between them and the — at the time incumbent — Green mayor Dieter Salomon and increasing differences when it comes to policies. The Greens in Baden-Württemberg, the state in which Freiburg is located in, are considered to be more conservative than in most other states, likely playing a part. The two had already been displeased with the policy of The Greens for quite some time already, which they considered to be somewhat undemocratic. They also criticized the lack of independence of the Green Party from the Mayor. In the end, they founded the new political group, somewhat further to the left of The Greens.

The Greens filed a complaint against the use of the name "Grüne Alternative Freiburg", which was rejected by the local court on July 7, 2012. The appeal against this decision was rejected by the Higher Regional Court on December 18, 2013.

Coinneach McCabe, the Scottish top candidate of the Green Alternative Freiburg, was born in Glasgow in 1974 and has been living in Freiburg since 1999. Monika Stein was born in Freiburg, worked as a teacher and had been a member of The Greens since 2002, then getting elected into the City Council for them in 2004, education being a very important topic for her. McCabe left the group in 2016 before moving to Berlin for personal and professional reasons, with Monika Stein replacing him after narrowly not being elected again in 2014.

== Policies ==
The Green Alternative Freiburg are considered to be to the left of The Greens on multiple topics. Proposals for the 2024 local election included, among others:

- Housing: Rent increase freeze at Stadtbau (the local housing buildiung utility, including social housing) for at least the next 3 years and consistent implementation of the 50% quota (preferably higher) for social housing construction in new development areas
- Education: Revocation of increases in daycare fees and increase in daycare management time, expansion of compulsory all-day primary schools, higher spending for training educators; Strengthening the Student Council
- Environment: Further promotion of green roofs and facades, preservation of green and recreational areas in the city; Removing sealing to allow more water to seep away; planting more trees to increase shade; protect the city from increasing heat waves
- Transport: Higher spending for public transport and faster expansion of the public transport network, especially the tram network; expand bike infrastructure and car sharing; in the long-term, free public transport, larger sidewalks and bike lanes; less public parking
- Energy: Massively expand solar and wind energy production and promote renewable production by others (i.e. private balcony solar farms); stop local energy provider Badenova from doing business that includes coal or atomic energy
- Social policy: Expand subsidies for people using the Freiburg Pass; limiting costs for poorer residents such as for energy, water, gas or waste services
- Culture and sports: Higher funding for cultural education, art and other culture; Promotion of the cities' nightlife; More locations for sports and higher funding; better funding for swimming pools and their expansion if necessary
- Immigration/Integration: No deportations from Freiburg; the right to education and health care for people without legal status; funding of enough language courses and civil engagement
- Economy/Finances: Increase in trade tax; get a reform of municipal financing into the state Landtag and the Bundestag
- Safety: More counselling and support services against violence against women; expansion of the women's night taxi; promoting non-repressive security concepts such as awareness teams; no video surveillance in public spaces
- Society: support for school projects and open work with children and young people against "inhumane ideologies"; no cooperation with right-wing extremist organisations and parties "such as the AfD"

== Election results ==
In Freiburg city council elections, voters can cast a total of 48 votes due to 48 seats being allocated.

The Green Alternative likely benefitted from the climate movement, such as Fridays for Future, receiving a lot of attention in 2019.

Election	Votes	%	Seats	+/–
2009	124,937	3.9 (#8)	2 / 48	New
2014	118,912	3.2 (#10)	1 / 48	▼1
2019	302,278	6.5 (#5)	3 / 48	▲2
2024	181,590	3.6 (#9)	2 / 48	▼1
