= Jean Charbonnel =

French politician

Jean Charbonnel (22 April 1927 – 19 February 2014) was a French politician.

== Biography ==
Born on 22 April 1927 in La Fère, Aisnes, Charbonnel served as a deputy of Corrèze between 1962 and 1993, as a state secretary for the French Ministry of Foreign Affairs between 1966 and 1967, then as the Minister of Industrial Renewal between 1972 and 1974. He was also the mayor of Brive from 1966 to 1995.

Charbonnel died on 19 February 2014 in Paris, aged 86.
