= Maurice Najman =

French journalist (1948–1999)

Maurice Najman (1948–1999) was a French political journalist during the late 1960s. He had a leftist political stance and mainly worked for Libération and Le Monde diplomatique. He was one of the leading figures of the youth movement of 1968 and cofounded a leftist organization, Comités d’Action Lycéens (CAL), targeting high school students in 1967.

== Biography ==
Najman was born in Paris in 1948. His parents were of Polish-Jewish origin. His father was a communist militant His mother, Solange, was a survivor of Auschwitz. Her mother was Rosa Luxemburg’s cousin.

Najman was a member of the Revolutionary Marxist Alliance (AMR), a Trotskyist organization, in the 1970s. He contributed to Libération, Le Monde diplomatique and L’Autre journal in which he published articles on international politics. He died in Paris on 4 February 1999.
