= Alternative Rouge et Verte =

Red and Green Alternative Alternative Rouge et Verte
- Abbreviation: AREV; ARV
- Founded: November 1989
- Dissolved: March 1998
- Merger of: PSU; NGSEA; FGA (fr)
- Succeeded by: Les Alternatifs
- Newspaper: Rouge et Vert
- Ideology: Socialist self-management Ecolibertarianism
- Political position: Far-left
- Colors: Red and green

The Alternative Rouge et Verte (AREV, English: Red and Green Alternative) was a French political party focused on ecology, the far-left, and autogestion. Formed in 1989, it dissolved in 1998.

The party's foundation was built on three pillars: socialism, political ecology, and self-management.

== History ==
AREV emerged partly from the committees supporting Pierre Juquin, a French Communist Party dissident, during the 1988 French presidential election. These committees included the Parti socialiste unifié, the Ligue communiste révolutionnaire, the Nouvelle gauche pour le socialisme, l'écologie et l'autogestion, and unaffiliated activists.

After the PSU dissolved in November 1989, many former members, along with activists from the Nouvelle gauche and the Fédération pour une gauche alternative (FGA), joined AREV to reject assimilation into Les Verts.

At its peak, AREV had over 6,000 members. However, its numbers dwindled over the years due to its lack of political opportunities and a unification strategy that led to members joining other organizations, including Les Verts and the LCR. By 1998, membership had fallen to around 300.

To avoid political extinction and to create space for a left-leaning ecological party, AREV and a splinter group from the Convention pour une alternative progressiste (CAP) formed Les Alternatifs on 29.

=== Youth Movement and Legacy ===
AREV's youth wing participated in the creation of Chiche! in 1996. This youth organization included members from Les Verts, Convergences Écologie Solidarité (CES), and CAP. The goal was to unite young ecologists under a single organization, potentially leading to a new political entity.

This strategy failed as Les Alternatifs and Les Verts did not merge, and in 2001, the Young Greens split to form an official youth wing of Les Verts.
