= 1988 French presidential election =

- 24 April 1988 (first round); 8 May 1988 (second round)
- Turnout: 81.38% (first round); 84.06% (second round)
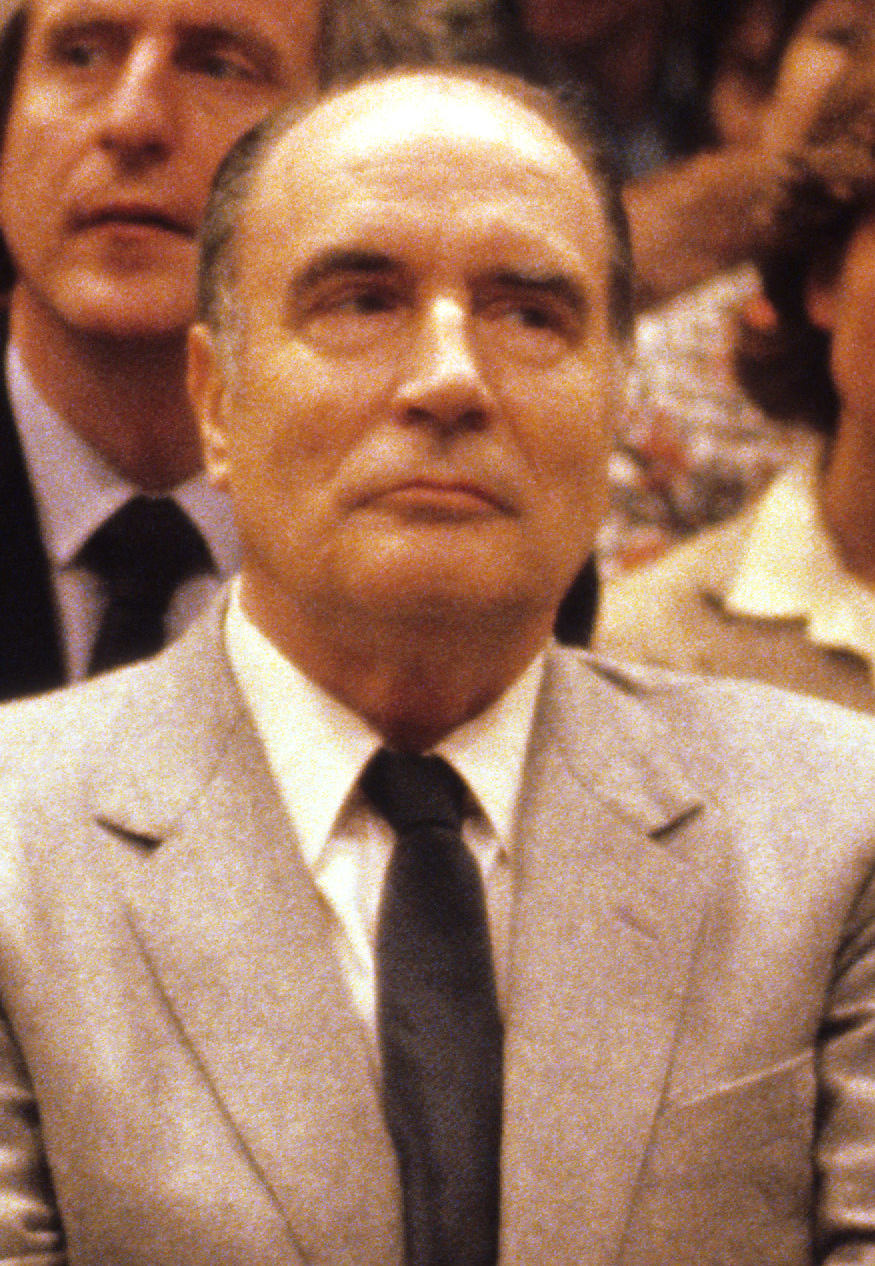

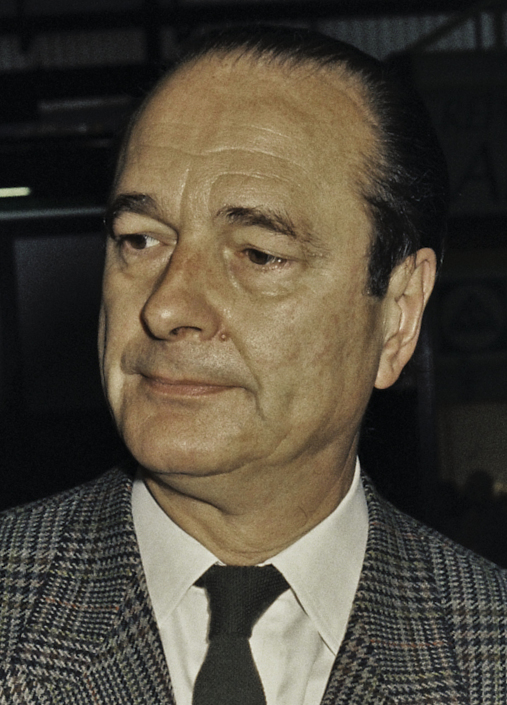
Candidate	François Mitterrand	Jacques Chirac
Party	PS	RPR
Popular vote	16,704,279	14,218,970
Percentage	54.02%	45.98%
President before election
François Mitterrand
PS
Elected President
François Mitterrand
PS

Presidential elections were held in France on 24 April and 8 May 1988.

In 1981, the Socialist Party leader, François Mitterrand, was elected President of France and the Left won the legislative election. However, in 1986, the right regained a parliamentary majority. President Mitterrand was forced to "cohabit" with a conservative cabinet led by the RPR leader Jacques Chirac. Chirac took responsibility for domestic policy while the President focused on his "reserved domain" – foreign affairs and defense policy. Moreover, several other prominent candidates opposed the two heads of the executive.

Chirac's cabinet advocated liberal-conservative policies, in abolishing the solidarity tax on wealth and selling some public companies. It was faced with opposition from social movements, supported by President Mitterrand.

Meanwhile, the leadership of Chirac over the right was challenged by the former UDF Prime Minister Raymond Barre. Barre gained some popularity by condemning the principle of the "cohabitation", claiming that it is incompatible with the "spirit of the Fifth Republic". He appeared as an alternative to the executive duo. In January 1988, when he announced his candidacy, Chirac was credited with 19.5% in the first round by SOFRES polls institute, against 23% for Barre. But, from the start of February, Chirac benefited from the internal divisions in the UDF, and took the lead among the right-wing candidates. Meanwhile, the National Front leader, Jean-Marie Le Pen, tried to confirm the FN's good result in the previous legislative election.

On the left, the identity of the Socialist candidate was uncertain. Mitterrand said he was not sure he would run, and meanwhile, his internal rival Michel Rocard campaigned for the nomination. The favourite to win the election according to the polls, the incumbent president announced his candidacy at the end of March. He wrote an open letter to the French, where he proposed a moderate programme ("neither nationalisations, nor privatizations") and advocated a "united France" against "the appropriation of the state by a clan", targeting Chirac and the RPR.

He benefited from the decline of the French Communist Party, represented by André Lajoinie. Lajoinie was faced with competition for the far-left vote by a "reforming Communist", Pierre Juquin and a Trotskyist, Arlette Laguiller. Meanwhile, the Ecologist Antoine Waechter refused to ally the Greens with either the left or the right.

The French economy shrugging off the early 1980s recession with 4% growth that year put the economy off the minds of voters as well as popular social programs being implemented, both of which gave Mitterrand the economic argument to achieve a second term despite the fallback in the last legislative election that caused cohabitation.

== Results ==
The second round consisted of a competition between the two heads of the executive power, but the first was marked by the unexpectedly high vote for the National Front, and a poor result for the Communist Party. Barre endorsed Chirac.

The TV debate between the two finalists, and protagonists of the "cohabitation", was very tense. Mitterrand wanted to show his ascendancy in naming his challenger "Mr Prime Minister". Chirac answered: "Here, you are not President, and I am not Prime Minister. We are two equal candidates. You will allow that I call you Mr Mitterrand". Mitterrand replied: "You are absolutely right, Mr Prime Minister". Besides, the two candidates clashed about their attitude to the September 1986 terrorist attacks.

François Mitterrand was re-elected President of France. Jacques Chirac resigned from the head of the cabinet. Michel Rocard succeeded him, then the Socialist Party obtained a relative parliamentary majority, President Mitterrand having dissolved the National Assembly. Chirac became president after winning the 1995 elections upon Mitterand's retirement.

Candidate	Party	First round		Second round	
Candidate	Party	Votes	%	Votes	%
François Mitterrand (incumbent)	Socialist Party	10,367,220	34.10	16,704,279	54.02
Jacques Chirac	Rally for the Republic	6,063,514	19.94	14,218,970	45.98
Raymond Barre	Union for French Democracy	5,031,849	16.55		
Jean-Marie Le Pen	National Front	4,375,894	14.39		
André Lajoinie	French Communist Party	2,055,995	6.76		
Antoine Waechter	The Greens	1,149,642	3.78		
Pierre Juquin	Independent communist	639,084	2.10		
Arlette Laguiller	Workers' Struggle	606,017	1.99		
Pierre Boussel	Movement for a Workers' Party	116,823	0.38		
Total		30,406,038	100.00	30,923,249	100.00
Valid votes		30,406,038	98.00	30,923,249	96.38
Invalid/blank votes		621,934	2.00	1,161,822	3.62
Total votes		31,027,972	100.00	32,085,071	100.00
Registered voters/turnout		38,128,507	81.38	38,168,869	84.06
Source: Constitutional Court

== See also ==
- President of France
- Politics of France
- French presidential elections under the Fifth Republic
