= Gilbert Marquis =

Swiss racewalker (1923–1983)

Personal information
- Nationality: Swiss
- Born: 28 July 1923
- Died: January 1983

Sport
- Sport: Athletics
- Event: Racewalking

Gilbert Marquis (28 July 1923 – January 1983) was a Swiss racewalker. He competed in the men's 50 kilometres walk at the 1952 Summer Olympics.
