= José Bidegain =

French entrepreneur

- Born: 16 May 1925; Buenos Aires, Argentina
- Died: 4 October 1999 (aged 74); Pau, France
- Occupation(s): Businessman, trade unionist
- Known for: Founder of Pau FC, President of Action contre la Faim

José Bidegain (16 May 1925 – 4 October 1999) was a French businessman and employer trade unionist. He is best known as the founder of Pau FC and for his involvement in the exploration of gouffre de la Pierre Saint-Martin cave system and humanitarian work with Action contre la Faim.

A prominent left-leaning industrialist and a figure in Christian socialism, Bidegain was deputy CEO of the family shoe company Beverly in Pau. He served as municipal councillor of Pau under mayor Louis Sallenave from 1953 to 1971.

He held influential positions in French employers’ associations, presiding over the Conseil national du patronat français (CNPF) from 1961 to 1964, and later became deputy CEO of Danone and Saint-Gobain in the 1970s. Bidegain co-founded the business club Entreprise et Progrès with François Dalle and served as adviser to the Ministry of Industry under Roger Fauroux during the Michel Rocard government. From 1991 until his death, he was president of the humanitarian NGO Action contre la Faim.

== Early life and family ==
Of Souletin origin, José Bidegain was born in Buenos Aires on 16 May 1925. His father, Georges Bidegain, had emigrated from Pau to South America before returning to Béarn in 1937 to establish the Beverly shoe factory.

He was the father of screenwriter and director Thomas Bidegain. Georges Bidegain had founded Bidegain SA and the brand Babybotte.

== Career ==
=== Business leadership ===
José Bidegain expanded the family business in the early 1950s, growing it from 50 to 1,000 employees in fifteen years. Beverly became one of the most modern shoe factories in Europe after its inauguration in 1957. The company remained family-run and resisted working with large retail chains until its liquidation in 2019.

=== Trade union leadership ===
From 1966 to 1977, Bidegain served as General Delegate of the National Federation of the Shoe Industry in France, representing 600 companies and 75,000 employees. During the May 1968 events, he provided logistical support to action committees and intervened to resolve the 1973 Romans-sur-Isère labor conflict.

=== Corporate management ===
Between 1978 and 1989, Bidegain was deputy CEO of BSN-Gervais-Danone and then Saint-Gobain, overseeing social policy.

=== Employer unionism ===
Bidegain was president of the Centre des jeunes dirigeants d'entreprise (CJD) from 1961 to 1964. After conflicts with the CNPF, he co-founded the Centre national des dirigeants d’entreprises (CNDE) in 1968 and later Entreprise et Progrès with François Dalle and Antoine Riboud, representing the reformist wing of French employers.

== Political engagement ==
Bidegain was active in the political think tank "Échanges et projets" founded by Jacques Delors, and served as its president in 1981.

== Humanitarian work ==
He was president of Action contre la Faim from 1991 until his death and was appointed to the Commission nationale consultative des droits de l'homme in December 1996.

== Sports ==
=== Rugby ===
Bidegain played as a lock for ASOP and was its president from 1956 to 1963.

=== Pau FC ===
He founded the Pau FC on 19 May 1959. Beverly remained closely linked to the club, hosting many general assemblies at the factory.

=== La Pierre Saint-Martin expedition ===
Bidegain participated in the 14 August 1952 expedition with Haroun Tazieff during which Marcel Loubens fell 15 meters to his death in the cave.

== Founder of Pau FC ==
José Bidegain founded the Pau Football Club on 19 May 1959.

Before its liquidation in 2019, José Bidegain's company, Beverly, remained closely linked to Pau FC, with many of the club's general assemblies being held at the company's factory.

== Other roles ==
From 1977 to 1996, he presided over the Association of Basques in Paris. In 1956, he was captain of the 3rd squadron of the 10th Dragoon Regiment in North Africa.

== Death ==
Bidegain was involved in a car accident in mid-July 1999 and died of cardiac arrest on 4 October 1999 in Pau.

== Honors ==
- Commander of the Legion of Honour (1993)
- Knight of the National Order of Merit (1966)
