= Unified Socialist Party (France) =

Unified Socialist Party Parti socialiste unifié
- Abbreviation: PSU
- Founder: Édouard Depreux; Michel Rocard; Michel Mousel; Huguette Bouchardeau
- Founded: April 3, 1960
- Dissolved: April 7, 1990; 36 years ago
- Merger of: UGS; PSA
- Merged into: AREV
- Membership (1960): 20,000
- Ideology: Democratic socialism Social democracy Autogestion; New Left
- Political position: Left-wing
- Regional affiliation: PSOM (historical)

The Unified Socialist Party (French: Parti socialiste unifié [paʁti sɔsjalist ynifje], PSU) was a French socialist political party, founded on April 3, 1960. It was originally led by Édouard Depreux (from its creation to 1967).

== History ==
1981 presidential election poster for PSU candidate Huguette Bouchardeau.

PSU was born through the fusion of the Autonomous Socialist Party (PSA), the Socialist Left Union (UGS), and the group around the journal Tribune du Communisme. The latter was a splinter group of the French Communist Party (PCF), which had left after the 1956 inner conflict caused by the Soviet invasion of Hungary. The PSA and the UGS were splinter groups of the French Section of the Workers' International (SFIO) party, which had left due to the repressive policy of the SFIO Prime Minister Guy Mollet during the Algerian War of Independence and his support to General Charles de Gaulle's return and the advent of the Fifth Republic under the military pressure. The three groups were closely linked from 1958. In 1961, the newly formed party was joined by Pierre Mendès-France, after he had left the Radical Party, and by Alain Savary, a former SFIO member as opposed as Mendès-France was to Charles de Gaulle's return to power in the turmoil of the May 1958 crisis.

In 1965, the PSU aligned with the SFIO and the PCF in supporting the candidacy of François Mitterrand in the presidential election. In contrast with the established socialist parties, the PSU also supported the student uprising of May 1968; it subsequently moved away from cooperation with the Socialist Party (PS) which succeeded the SFIO after 1969, and developed its own program, based on autogestion (workers' self-management).

Michel Rocard was the PSU candidate for the 1969 presidential elections, obtaining 3.61% of the vote in the first round. The party again campaigned for Mitterrand in the 1974 presidential elections — a move which encountered the opposition of the PSU's own supporters at grassroots level; the PSU did not sign Mitterrand's Common programme of the Left (agreed with the Communists), and a sizeable section of the party activists, led by Michel Rocard and Robert Chapuis, left to join the renewed Socialist Party (believing that they could better function as a leftist tendency with the PS). The PSU supported the self-managed Lip factory.

PSU introduced Huguette Bouchardeau as its candidate for the 1981 presidential elections; she obtained 1.1% of the vote in the first round. In the 1988 presidential elections, the PSU supported the communist dissident candidate Pierre Juquin, who obtained 2.1% of the votes in the first round. In 1989, PSU merged with the New Left for Socialism, Ecology and Self-management (Juquin's movement), and formed the Red and Green Alternatives (nowadays integrated in the group Les Alternatifs).

== National Secretaries ==
- 1960–1967: Édouard Depreux
- 1967–1973: Michel Rocard
- 1973–1974: Robert Chapuis
- 1974–1979: Michel Mousel
- 1979–1981: Huguette Bouchardeau
- 1981–1983: Jacques Salvator
- 1983–1984: Serge Depaquit
- 1984–1989: Jean-Claude Le Scornet

== Electoral performance ==
=== National Assembly ===
Year	Leader	First round		Second round		Seats in the National Assembly
Year	Leader	Number of votes	Percentage of votes	Number of votes	Percentage of votes	Seats in the National Assembly
1962	Édouard Depreux	427,467	2.33	138,131	0.90	2 / 465
1967	Édouard Depreux	495,412	2.21	173,466	0.93	4 / 487
1968	Michel Rocard	1,037,063	4.29	144,361	0.99	0 / 487
1973	Michel Rocard	778,195	3.27	114,540	0.49	1 / 488

=== Presidential candidates ===
Year	Nominee	First round		Second round		Notes
Year	Nominee	Number of votes	Percentage of votes	Number of votes	Percentage of votes	Notes
1965	François Mitterrand (FGDS)	7,694,005	31.72	10,619,735	44.80	PSU supported the candidate of the united left.
1969	Michel Rocard	816,470	3.61	eliminated		
1974	François Mitterrand (PS)	11,044,373	43.25	12,971,604	49.19	PSU supported the candidate of the united left.
1981	Huguette Bouchardeau	321,353	1.11	eliminated		
1988	Pierre Juquin (dissident Communist)	639,084	2.10	eliminated		

== Notable members ==
- Alain Badiou
- François Furet
- Jean Maitron
- Pierre Vidal-Naquet

== See also ==
- Lip factory
- New Left
- Pacifist Socialist Party
- Popular socialism (Nordic countries)
