= Les Alternatifs =

The Alternatives Les Alternatifs
- Founded: March 29, 1998
- Dissolved: March 15, 2015
- Merger of: AREV; CAP (minority)
- Merged into: Ensemble!
- Headquarters: 40 Rue de Malte; 75011 Paris
- Membership: 700
- Ideology: Autogestionary socialism Green politics Alter-globalization; Feminism; Communism
- Political position: Far-left
- European affiliation: European Alliance of EU Critical Movements
- Colors: Red and Green

Website
- alternatifs.org

The Alternatives (French: Les Alternatifs) was a former French political party aligned with the far left. Founded in 1998 from the merger of the Alternative rouge et verte and a minority faction of the Convention pour une alternative progressiste, it dissolved in 2015, with its majority merging into Ensemble!. The party identified with alter-globalization, with core principles emphasizing solidarity, ecology, feminism, and self-management (autogestion).

The movement combined several political tendencies:

- Self-management-oriented and alternative left;
- Anti-bureaucratic currents within the communist movement;
- Socially grounded ecological activism.

Following its dissolution, a minority formed Alternatives et autogestion, later participating in founding Pour une écologie populaire et sociale.

== Ideology and Activities ==
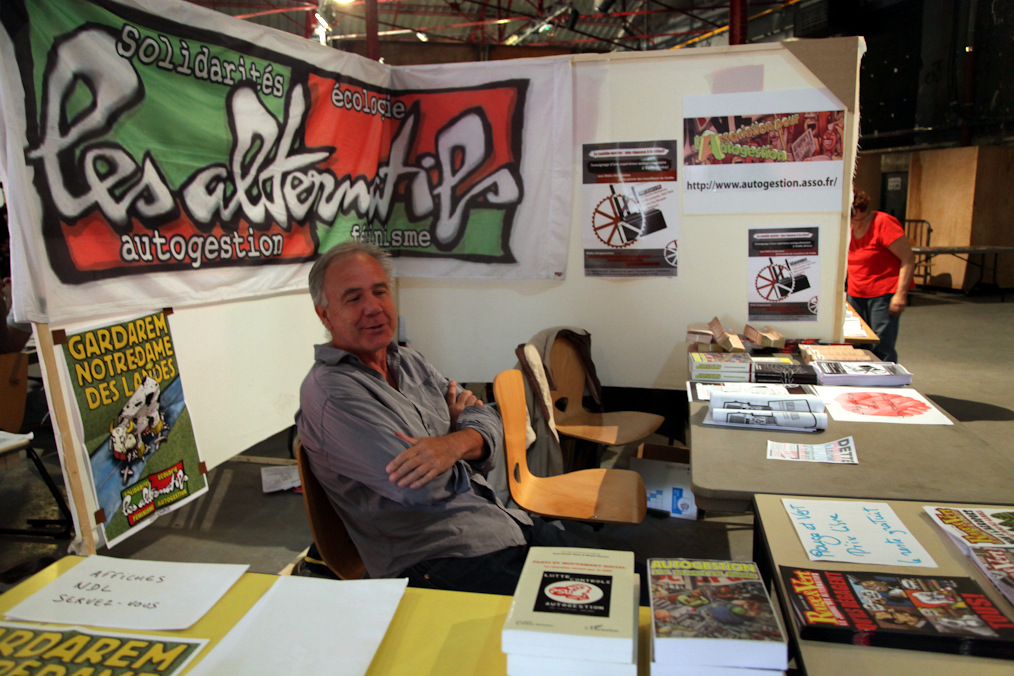
Stand of The Alternatives at the 2013 Self-Management Fair.

The Alternatives advocated for a union of the anti-liberal left and participated in the "May 29 collectives" that drafted the Anti-liberal charter. For the 2007 French presidential election, they supported a unified candidacy from the left opposing the European Constitution and anti-liberalism. On 2006, party members approved a motion to support José Bové’s candidacy with 82.6% in favor.

During the 2010 French regional elections, the party collaborated nationally with the Left Front. Following internal debates in 2011, they chose to leave the Federation for a Social and Ecological Alternative and supported Jean-Luc Mélenchon in the 2012 French presidential election.

== Internal Structure ==
The Alternatives operated without a president or secretary-general, opting instead for a pair of spokespeople. Decisions were made through the General Coordination of regional federations and local groups. The executive body handled technical matters and met in "enlarged" formats with thematic commissions and regional representatives.

== Youth Organization ==
The Alternatives' youth wing initially collaborated with the Greens under the group Chiche!. After the Greens' youth organization split in 2001, Chiche! became independent, while The Alternatives' youth formed local groups under the "Youth Network."

== Dissolution ==
On 2015, the party voted to dissolve and integrate into Ensemble!, with 65.42% in favor. A minority formed "Alternatives et autogestion" (AA), which joined Pour une écologie populaire et sociale in 2019.

== See also ==
- Alternative rouge et verte
- Convention pour une alternative progressiste
- Front de gauche
