= History of the French Communist Party =

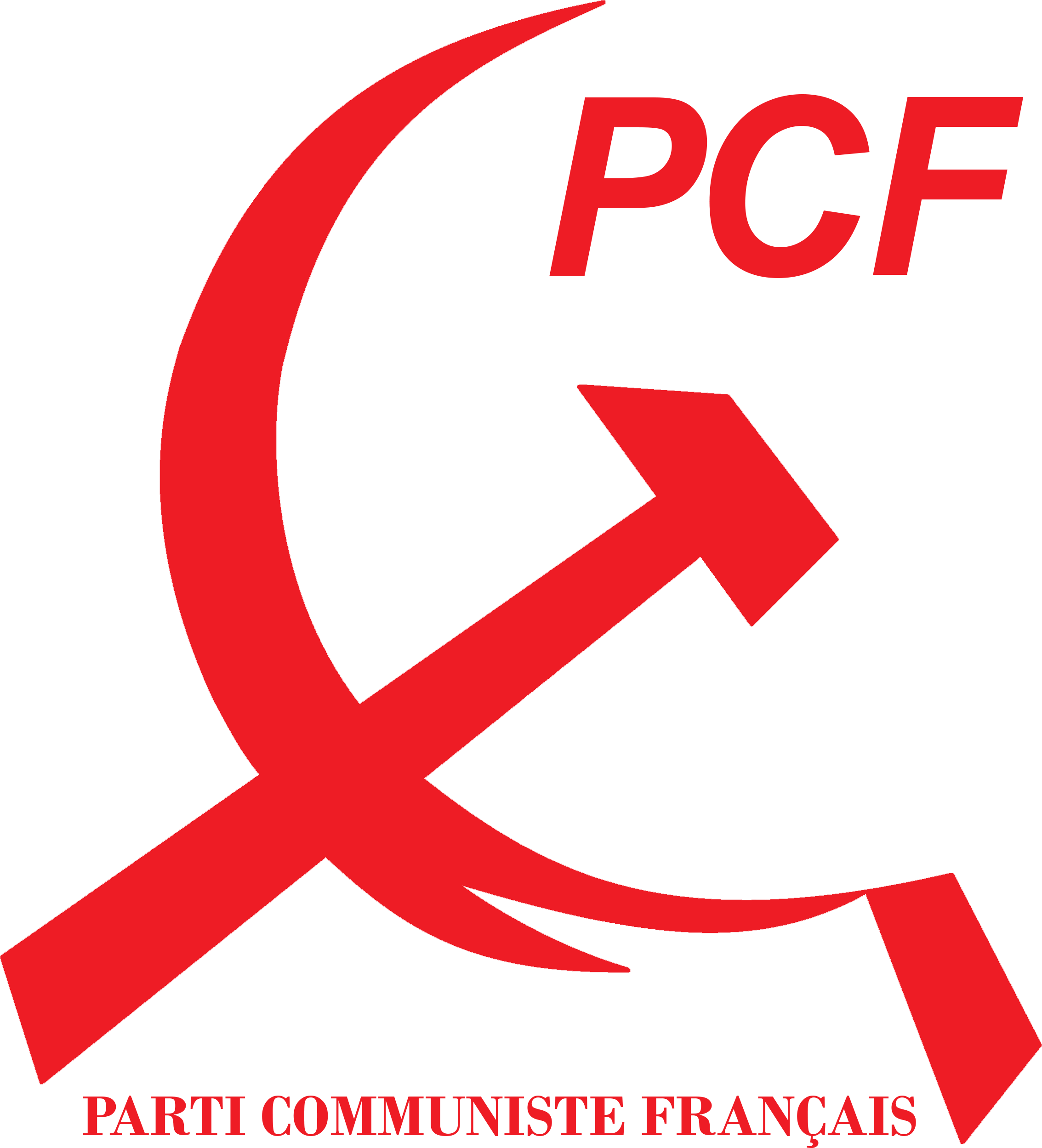
Former logo (1978)

The French Communist Party (French: Parti Communiste Français; abbreviated PCF) has been a part of the political scene in France since 1920, peaking in strength around the end of World War II. It originated when a majority of members resigned from the socialist French Section of the Workers' International (SFIO) party to set up the French Section of the Communist International (SFIC). The SFIO had been divided over support for French participation in World War I and over whether to join the Communist International (Comintern). The new SFIC defined itself as revolutionary and democratic centralist. Ludovic-Oscar Frossard was its first secretary-general, and Ho Chi Minh was also among the founders. Frossard himself resigned in 1923, and the 1920s saw a number of splits within the party over relations with other left-wing parties and over adherence to the Communist International's dictates. The party gained representation in the French parliament in successive elections, but also promoted strike action and opposed colonialism. Pierre Semard, leader from 1924 to 1928, sought party unity and alliances with other parties; but leaders including Maurice Thorez (party leader from 1930 to 1964) imposed a Stalinist line from the late 1920s, leading to loss of membership through splits and expulsions, and reduced electoral success. With the rise of Fascism this policy shifted after 1934, and the PCF supported the Popular Front, which came to power under Léon Blum in 1936. The party helped to secure French support for the Second Spanish Republic during the Spanish Civil War and opposed the 1938 Munich Agreement with Hitler. During this period the PCF adopted a more patriotic image, and favoured an equal but distinct role for women in the communist movement.

The party was banned in 1939 on the outbreak of World War II. Under Comintern direction the PCF opposed the war and may have sabotaged arms production. The leadership, threatened with execution, fled abroad. After the German invasion of 1940 the party failed to persuade the occupiers to legalise its activities, and while denouncing the war as a struggle between imperialists, began to organise opposition to the occupation. When Germany invaded the Soviet Union the next year, the Comintern declared Germany to be an enemy, and the PCF expanded its anti-German activities, forming the National Front movement within the broader Resistance and organising direct action and political assassinations through the armed Francs-Tireurs et Partisans (FTP) group. At the same time the PCF began to work with de Gaulle's "Free France", the London-based government in exile, and later took part in the National Council of the Resistance (CNR).

By the time the German occupation ended in 1944, the party had become a powerful force in many parts of France. It was among the leading parties in elections in 1945 and 1946, and entered into the governing Tripartite alliance with the socialist SFIO and the Christian democratic MRP. The Tripartite governments pursued social reforms and statism. However, amid concerns within France and abroad over the extent of communist influence, the PCF was excluded from government in May 1947. Under pressure from Moscow, the PCF thereafter distanced itself from other parties and focused on agitation within its trade union base. For the rest of the Fourth Republic period the PCF, led by Thorez and Jacques Duclos, remained politically isolated, still taking a Stalinist line, though retaining substantial electoral support.

Although the PCF opposed de Gaulle's formation of the Fifth Republic in 1958, the following years saw a rapprochement with other left-wing forces and an increased strength in parliament. With Waldeck Rochet as its new secretary-general, the party supported François Mitterrand's unsuccessful presidential bid in 1965 and started to move apart to a limited extent from the Soviet Union. During the student riots and strikes of May 68, the party supported the strikes while denouncing the revolutionary student movements. After heavy losses in the ensuing parliamentary elections, the party adopted Georges Marchais as leader and in 1973 entered into a "Common Programme" alliance with Mitterrand's reconstituted Socialist Party (PS). Under the Common Programme, however, the PCF steadily lost ground to the PS, a process that continued after Mitterrand's victory in 1981.

Initially allotted a minor share in Mitterrand's government, the PCF resigned in 1984 as the government turned towards fiscal orthodoxy. Under Marchais the party continued loyal to the Soviet Union up to its fall in 1991, and made little move towards "Eurocommunism". Extensive reform of the party's structure and policies had to wait until 1994, when Robert Hue became leader. The party's renunciation of much traditional communist dogma after this did little to stem its declining popularity, although it entered government again in 1997 as part of the Plural Left coalition. Elections in 2002 gave worse results than ever for the PCF, now led by Marie-George Buffet. Under Buffet, the PCF turned away from parliamentary strategy and sought broader social alliances. It condemned the Nicolas Sarkozy government's response to riots in 2005 and adopted a more militant stance towards the European Union. Buffet's attempt to stand in the 2007 presidential election as a common candidate of the "anti-liberal left" had little success. To maintain a presence in parliament after 2007 the party's few remaining deputies had to group together with those from The Greens and others to create the Democratic and Republican Left group (GDR). Subsequently, a broader electoral coalition, the Left Front (FG), was formed including the PCF, Jean-Luc Mélenchon's Left Party (PG), Unitary Left, and others. The FG has continued up to the present and has brought the French communists somewhat better electoral results, at the price of some tension within the party and with other parties in the FG. With Pierre Laurent as leader since 2010, in a symbolic move the party no longer includes the hammer and sickle logo on its membership cards.

== Foundation ==
The French Communist Party was founded in December 1920 by a split in the socialist French Section of the Workers' International (SFIO), led by the majority of party members who supported membership in the Communist International (or "Comintern") founded in 1919 by Lenin after the Bolshevik Revolution in Russia.

The outbreak of World War I in 1914 sparked tensions within the SFIO, when a majority of the SFIO took what left-wing socialists called a "social-chauvinist" line in support of the French war effort. Gradually, anti-war factions gained in influence in the party and Ludovic-Oscar Frossard was elected general secretary in October 1918. Additionally, the success of the Bolshevik Revolution in Russia aroused hope for a similar communist revolution in France among some SFIO members.

After the war, the issue of membership in the new Communist International became a major issue for the SFIO. In the spring of 1920, Frossard and Marcel Cachin, director of the party newspaper L'Humanité, were commissioned to meet with Bolshevik leaders in Russia. They observed the second congress of the Communist International, during the course of which Vladimir Lenin set out the 21 conditions for membership. When they returned, Frossard and Cachin recommended that the party join the Communist International.

At the SFIO's Tours Congress in December 1920, this opinion was supported by the left-wing faction (Boris Souvarine, Fernand Loriot) and the 'centrist' faction (Ludovic-Oscar Frossard, Marcel Cachin), but opposed by the right-wing faction (Léon Blum). This majority option won three quarters of the votes from party members at the congress. The pro-Comintern majority founded a new party, known as the French Section of the Communist International (Section française de l'Internationale communiste, SFIC), which accepted the strict conditions for membership.

A majority of socialist parliamentarians and local officeholders were opposed to membership, particularly because of the Communist International's strict democratic centralism and its denunciation of parliamentarianism. These members went on to form a rump SFIO, which had a much smaller membership than the SFIC but which could count on a strong base of officeholders and parliamentarians.

The founders of the SFIC took with them the party paper L'Humanité, founded by Jean Jaurès in 1904, which remained tied to the party until the 1990s. In the General Confederation of Labour (CGT) trade unions, the Communist minority split away to form the United General Confederation of Labour (CGTU) in 1922.

The new communist party defined itself as a revolutionary party, which used legal as well as clandestine or illegal means. The party organization was run under strict democratic centralist precepts, until the 1990s: the minority factions were compelled to follow the majority faction, any organized factions or contrary opinions were forbidden, while membership was tightly controlled and dissidents often purged from the party.

Ho Chi Minh, who would create the Việt Minh in 1941 and then declare the independence of Vietnam, was one of its founding members.

== Marginalization (1922–1934) ==
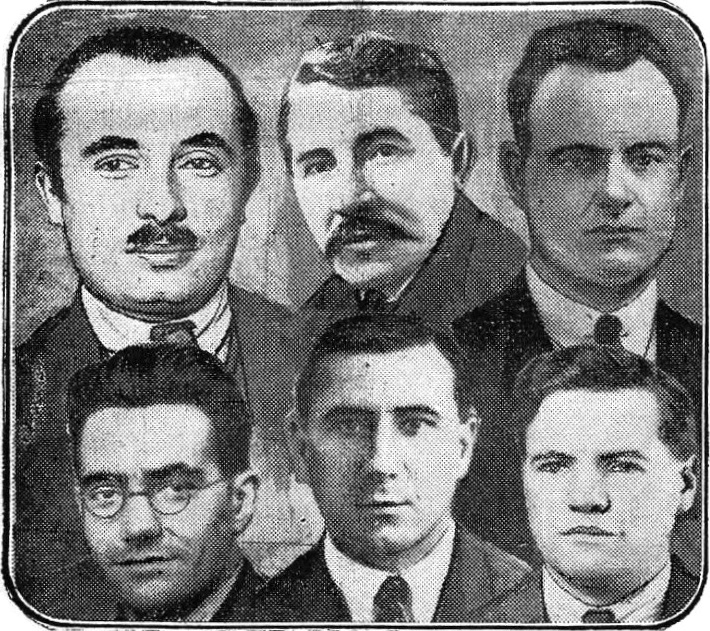
Six communist candidates running for the 1928 legislative elections

In its early years, as the communists fought the SFIO for control of the French left, the new party was weakened and marginalized by a series of splits and expulsions.

The "bolshevization" or stalinization imposed by the Communist International, as well as Zinoviev's power over the Communist International, led to internal crises. "Bolshevization" implied not only the adoption of the political strategy of the Communist International but a reorganization of party's structure on the model of the Bolsheviks (discipline, local organization under the shape of "cells", ascent of a young political staff which came from the working-class).

The first secretary-general of the PCF, Ludovic-Oscar Frossard, was often reluctant to obey the directives of the Communist International. Indeed, the party leadership was opposed to the strategy of the "proletarian unique front". Furthermore, one of Frossard's internal opponents, Boris Souvarine, was a member of the secretariat of the Communist International. Frossard resigned and left the PCF in 1923 to found a dissident United Communist Party which later became the Communist Socialist Party (but Frossard himself rejoined the SFIO). The general secretariat of the Party was shared by Louis Sellier (center faction) and Albert Treint (left-wing faction). At the same time, Boris Souvarine was expelled from the Communist International and the PCF due to his sympathy for Leon Trotsky.

In the 1924 legislative election, the PCF won 9.8% of the vote and 26 seats, considerably weaker than the SFIO. But under the leadership of the left-wing faction, priority was given to general strikes and revolutionary actions rather than elections. In the French Parliament, the PCF's first elected deputies were opposed to the Cartel des Gauches coalition formed by the SFIO and the Radical Party, which governed between 1924 and 1926.

In order to reconcile the various factions of the party, Pierre Sémard, railroad worker and union activist, was chosen as the new secretary-general. He wanted to put an end to sectarianism, which was criticized by communist officeholders and leaders of the CGTU. Most notably, he proposed alliances with other left-wing parties (including the SFIO) in order to combat fascism. This strategy was criticized by the board of the Communist International as "parliamentarist". At the same time, the party campaigned against French colonialism in Morocco (the Rif War), leading to the detention of some PCF members, including Sémard. On his release from prison, he became more and more controversial. Only 11 PCF candidates were elected in the Chamber of Deputies in the 1928 election, although the PCF increased its support to 11%.

In 1927, in the Soviet Union, Josef Stalin sidelined his opponents (Zinoviev, Kamenev and Leon Trotsky) and imposed a strict "class against class" line on the Communist International. In France, a Stalinist committee took control of the PCF . Its most influential figures came from the Communist Youth, notably Henri Barbé and Pierre Célor. They applied the "class against class" political line of the Communist International, denouncing social democracy and the SFIO as akin to bourgeois parties. Simultaneously, the new leadership purged dissidents, like Louis Sellier, former secretary-general, who created the Worker and Peasant Party, which merged with the Communist Socialist Party to form the Party of Proletarian Unity (PUP). By the end of the 1920s, the party contained fewer than 30,000 members.

The collegial leadership of the party was divided between young leaders and more experienced politicians. The secretary for organization, Maurice Thorez, was chosen as the new secretary-general in 1930. In 1931, Barbé and Celor were accused of responsibility for excesses in the "class against class" strategy. Nonetheless, the strategy was continued.

Indeed, the Wall Street Crash of 1929 and the Great Depression, which affected France beginning in 1931, caused much anxiety and disturbance, as in other countries. As economic liberalism failed, many were eagerly looking for new solutions. Technocratic ideas were born during this time (Groupe X-Crise), as well as autarky and corporatism in the fascist movement, which advocated union of workers and employers. Some members were attracted to these new ideas, most notably Jacques Doriot. A member of the presidium of the executive committee of the Comintern from 1922 onwards, and from 1923 onwards the secretary of the French Federation of Young Communists, later elected to the French Chamber of Deputies from Saint-Denis, he came to advocate an alliance between the Communists and SFIO. Doriot was then expelled in 1934, and with his followers. Afterwards he moved sharply to the right and formed the French Popular Party, which would be one of the most collaborationist parties during the Vichy regime.

The PCF was the main organizer of a counter-exhibition to the 1931 Colonial Exhibition in Paris, called "The Truth about the Colonies". In the first section, it recalled Albert Londres and André Gide's critics of forced labour in the colonies and other crimes of the New Imperialism period; in the second section, it contrasted imperialist colonialism to "the Soviets' policy on nationalities". In 1934 the Tunisian Federation of the PCF became the Tunisian Communist Party.

The PCF suffered substantial losses in the 1932 election, winning only 8% of the vote and 10 seats. The 1932 election saw the victory of another Cartel des gauches. This time, although the PCF did not participate in the coalition, it supported the government from the outside (soutien sans participation), similar to how the Socialists, prior to the First World War, had supported republican and Radical governments without participating.

The Communist Party attracted various intellectuals and artists in the 1920s, including André Breton, the leader of the Surrealist movement, Henri Lefebvre (who would be expelled in 1958), Paul Éluard, Louis Aragon, and others.

In the early 1930s, its Comintern-appointed coordinator became Ana Pauker, who will later become the Foreign Minister of Romania, being the first woman to hold this position.

== The Popular Front (1934–1939) ==
This second Cartel coalition fell following the far-right 6 February 1934 riots, which forced Radical Prime Minister Édouard Daladier to cede power to the conservative Gaston Doumergue. Following this crisis, the PCF, like the whole of the socialist movement, feared that France was on the verge of fascist takeover. Adolf Hitler's rise to power in 1933 and the destruction of the Communist Party of Germany following the 27 February 1933 Reichstag fire led Moscow and Stalin to change course, and adopt the popular front strategy whereby communists were to form anti-fascist coalitions with their erstwhile socialist and bourgeois enemies. Maurice Thorez spearheaded the formation of an alliance with the SFIO, and later the Popular Front in 1936.

During the Popular Front era (after 1934) the PCF rapidly grew in size and influence, its growth fueled by the popularity of the Comintern's Popular Front strategy, which allowed an anti-fascist alliance with the SFIO and the Radical Party. The PCF made substantial gains in the 1934 cantonal elections and established themselves as the dominant political force in working-class municipalities surrounding Paris (the Red Belt) in the 1935 municipal elections.

The Popular Front won the 1936 elections; the PCF itself made major gains – taking 15.3% and 72 seats. SFIO leader Léon Blum formed a Socialist-Radical government, supported from the outside by the PCF. However, the Popular Front government soon collapsed under the strains of domestic financial problems (including inflation) and foreign policy issues (the radicals opposed intervention in the Spanish Civil War while the socialists and communists were in favour), and was replaced by a moderate government led by Édouard Daladier.

As the only major communist party in western Europe that was still legal, the PCF played a major role in supporting the Spanish Second Republic during the Spanish Civil War, alongside the Soviet Union. Blum's government officially maintained a neutral policy of non-intervention, but in practice his government ensured the safe passage of aid and Soviet weapons to the besieged Spanish republicans. The PCF often played a major role in such actions, and it sent a number of French volunteers to fight for the republicans in the International Brigades. At the end of the conflict, the PCF organized humanitarian aid for Spanish refugees.

The PCF's 72 deputies (along with only three others) opposed the ratification of the Munich Accords, signed by Daladier and Neville Chamberlain. The PCF believed that the accords would allow Hitler to turn his attention eastwards, towards the Soviet Union.

On 12 August 1936, a party organization was formed in Madagascar, the Communist Party (French Section of the Communist International) of the Region of Madagascar.

=== New social positions ===
The cross-class coalition of the Popular Front forced the Communists to accept some bourgeois cultural norms they had long ridiculed. These included patriotism, the veterans' sacrifice, the honor of being an army officer, the prestige of the bourgeois, and the leadership of the Socialist Party and the parliamentary Republic. Above all the Communists portrayed themselves as French nationalists. Young Communists dressed in costumes from the revolutionary period and the scholars glorified the Jacobins as heroic predecessors.

The Communists in the 1920s saw the need to mobilize young women, but saw them as auxiliaries to male organizations. In the 1930s there was a new model, of a separate but equal role for women. The Party set up the Union des Jeunes Filles de France (UJFF) to appeal to young working women through publications and activities geared to their interests. The Party discarded its original notions of Communist femininity and female political activism as a gender-neutral revolutionary. It issued a new model more attuned to the mood of the late 1930s and one more acceptable to the middle class elements of the Popular Front. It now portrayed the ideal Young Communist as a paragon of moral probity with her commitment to marriage and motherhood, and gender-specific public activism.

== World War II (1939–1945) ==
=== Before Operation Barbarossa (1939 – June 1941) ===
Germany and the Soviet Union signed the Molotov–Ribbentrop Pact in August 1939, forming neutrality between both ideological rivals. The non-aggression pact between the Nazis and Moscow dismayed many French communists, a number of whom rejected the pact. A fifth of the PCF's caucus left the party, forming a dissident parliamentary group.

Shortly after France entered World War II in September 1939, the PCF was declared a proscribed organisation by Édouard Daladier's government. At first the PCF reaffirmed its commitment to national defense, but after the Comintern addressed French Communists by declaring the war to be 'imperialist', the party changed its stance. PCF parliamentarians signed a letter calling for peace and viewed Hitler's forthcoming peace proposals favourably. The Comintern ordered the PCF leadership to flee to Belgium, while Maurice Thorez, on Georgi Dimitrov's orders, deserted the army and fled to Moscow in order to escape prosecution. The PCF became a clandestine organization, at first rather disorganized. In France, the government dissolved all Communist-led local administrations, cracked down on communist trade unionists and targeted the L'Humanité newspaper. The government decreed that any communist propaganda, assimilated to Nazi propaganda, would be punished by the death penalty. After Communist Party was dissolved by the government, the Communist group in the Chamber was replaced by the French Workers' and Peasants' Group, whose president was Arthur Ramette and whose general secretary was Florimond Bonte.

Domestically, the PCF led anti-war actions, but although the party published pacifist propaganda for soldiers they stopped short of inciting desertion. The role of the PCF in alleged sabotage operations, against armaments plants, has been a point of debate among historians. In 1951, A. Rossi listed a number of sabotage operations initiated by the PCF against armaments factories throughout France, but later historians have downplayed the PCF's role in any such actions, stating that they were isolated cases.

After the German invasion of France in 1940 and the ensuing Nazi occupation of France, the relationship between the Communists and the German occupiers fluctuated. The domestic leadership, led by Maurice Tréand with the knowledge of Jacques Duclos, petitioned the Germans to allow the republication of L'Humanité, which would take a neutral stance on the occupation. But these negotiations were a disaster for the party, as Hitler disavowed Otto Abetz and Vichy was successfully able to oppose the legalization of the PCF. Nevertheless, the PCF limited openly anti-German or anti-occupation actions and instead adopted virulently anti-British, anti-imperialist, anti-socialist and anti-Vichy/Pétain rhetoric which shied away from directly attacking the Nazi occupiers. In return, Otto Abetz would have allowed for the liberation of over 300 communist prisoners. Moscow later denounced the attempts of the PCF to lobby the Germans for the party's legalization. In August 1940, a new policy categorically forbade any expressions of solidarity with the occupiers and limited interactions between the PCF and the occupiers.

Simultaneously, however, many communists and PCF cells reorganized clandestinely and began organizing opposition to the Germans and Philippe Pétain's regime in Vichy. One of the major actions organized by the PCF against the occupation forces was a demonstration of thousands of students and workers, staged in Paris on 11 November 1940. In May 1941, the PCF helped to organize more than 100,000 miners in the Nord and Pas-de-Calais departments in a strike. On 26 April 1941, the PCF called for a National Front for the independence of France with the Gaullists. The Vichy French police, and later the Germans, began to arrest and intern large number of communists.

=== Armed resistance (June 1941 – 1945) ===
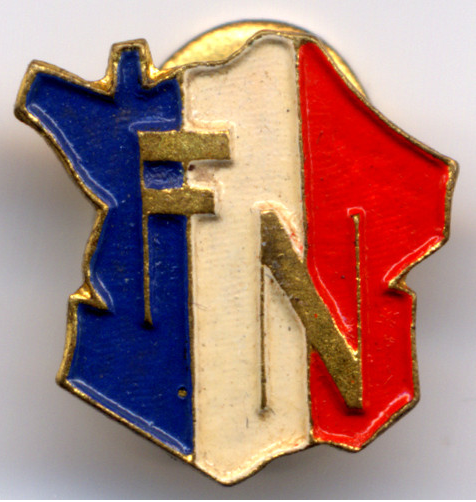
National Front logo, 1945

When Germany invaded the Soviet Union in June 1941, Stalin ordered all communists to engage in the armed struggle against the new Nazi enemy. The PCF expanded Resistance efforts within France, notably advocating the use of direct action and political assassinations. In August 1941, Pierre Georges (Colonel Fabien) shot and killed a German naval officer in the Paris métro. In October, the Germans stepped up reprisal actions, ordering the execution of 22 interned communists at Châteaubriant including the 17-year-old Guy Môquet, later honoured as a hero of the resistance.

By late 1941 and early 1942, the PCF set up the Francs-Tireurs et Partisans (FTP), the armed faction of the communist-led National Front. At the same time, with Moscow's blessing, the PCF engaged in talks with Charles de Gaulle, the leader of Free France in London. The communists began cooperating with the Free French, while maintaining their distance from other resistance organizations in the north and the south—remaining independent of the Unified Movements of the Resistance (MUR), the structure organized by Jean Moulin which organized the southern resistance. The National Front, PCF and CGT participated in the creation of the National Council of the Resistance (CNR) in May 1943.

During this time period, the PCF was led by Jacques Duclos and Benoît Frachon, operating out of the Hurepoix region in the Essonne department south of Paris. Under their leadership, the PCF maintained strong internal cohesion under centralized authority, which greatly boosted their power and influence within the resistance movement. In the regions, local communists played significant roles in spearheading the resistance. Most famously, PCF activist Georges Guingouin organized and led the maquis in the Haute-Vienne (Limousin). Immigrant workers linked to the PCF partook in resistance operations through the FTP-MOI (Francs-tireurs et partisans – main-d'œuvre immigrée).

By 1944 the PCF had reached the height of its influence, and was powerful in large areas of the country through the Resistance units under its command. Some in the PCF wanted to launch a revolution as the Germans withdrew from the country, but the leadership, acting on Stalin's instructions, opposed this and adopted a policy of co-operating with the Allied powers and advocating a new Popular Front government. Many well-known figures joined the party during the war, including Pablo Picasso, who joined the PCF in 1944.

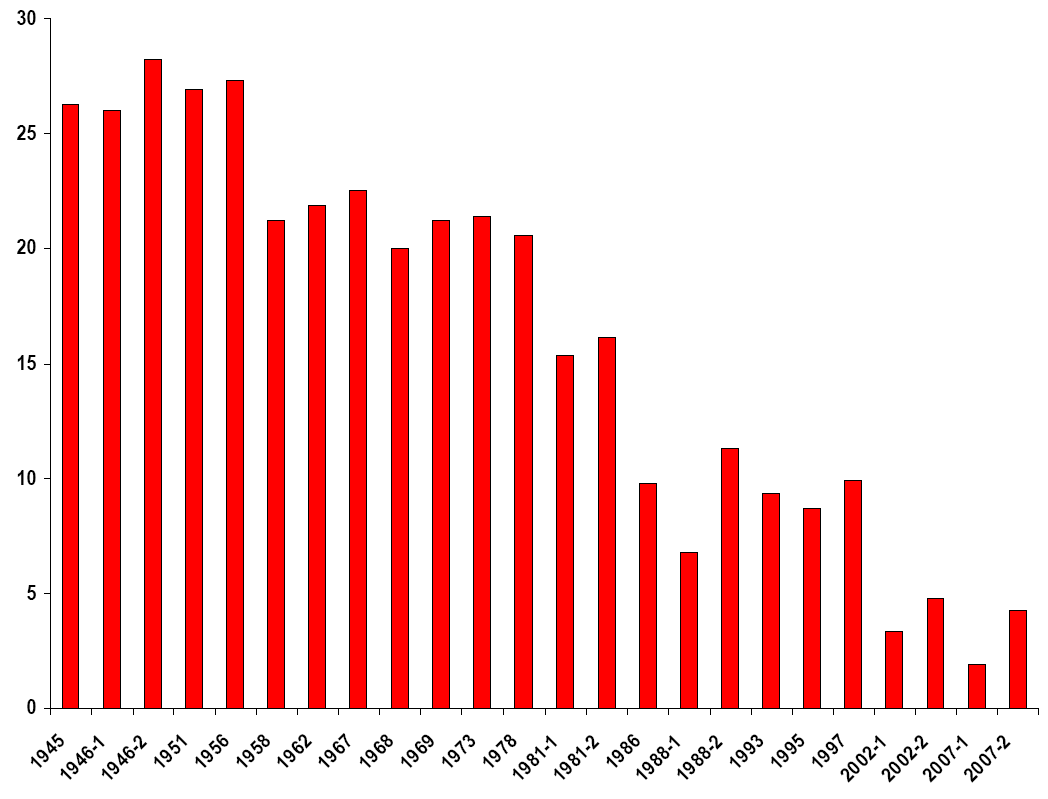
Share of vote at elections, 1945–2007

== Provisional Government and the Fourth Republic (1945–1958) ==
=== The PCF at its peak and the Tripartite governments (1945–1947) ===
The Communists came out extraordinarily strengthened from the Resistance, in terms of both organisation and prestige. With the liberation of France in 1944, the PCF, along with other resistance groups, entered the government of Charles de Gaulle. As in post-war Italy, the communists were very popular and formed one of the major political forces in the country. The PCF was nicknamed the "party of the 75,000 executed people" (le parti des 75 000 fusillés) because of its important role during the Resistance.

By the close of 1945 party membership stood at half a million, an enormous increase from its pre-Popular Front figure of less than thirty thousand. In the first post-war elections for the unicameral interim Constituent National Assembly in October 1945, the PCF became the single largest party in France with 26.2% of the vote and 159 seats. In the June 1946 elections for another constituent assembly, the PCF placed second but remained strong with 26% and 153 seats. In the November 1946 elections, which elected the first legislature of the new French Fourth Republic, the PCF obtained its best result in its history – 28.3% and 182 seats.

Between 1944 and May 1947, the PCF participated in governing coalitions. Maurice Thorez served in cabinet between November 1945 and May 1947, including a period as vice-president of the council of ministers between January 1946 and May 1947. The PCF was a core component of the Tripartite alliance with the French Section of the Workers' International (SFIO) and the Christian democratic Popular Republican Movement (MRP) throughout this period. The tripartite governments under the provisional government (GPRF) and, after October 1946, the Fourth Republic, introduced a program of social reforms which laid the foundations of the French welfare state. This included the nationalization of strategic economic sectors (electricity (EDF) in 1946, the AGF insurance firm, the Crédit Lyonnais bank in 1945 and the Société Générale bank in 1946, as well as the nationalization of the car maker Renault). Trade union independence was guaranteed by the 1946 Charter of Amiens, a minimum wage established in 1947. This program comprised a substantial part of the so-called acquis sociaux (social rights) established in France during the second half of the twentieth century. Although the PCF were the largest party in most tripartite governments formed between 1945 and 1947, they never obtained the presidency of the council of ministers and only rarely held strategic cabinet portfolios such as finance, defense or the interior. PCF cabinet ministers usually held the public health, armaments, reconstruction, industrial production and labour portfolios. (Ambroise Croizat was minister of labour between 1945 and 1947.

The PCF and socialists played a major role in drafting the proposed April 1946 constitution, but it was rejected by voters in a referendum in May 1946, with 53% against.

The party's strong electoral showing and surge in membership led some observers, including American under-secretary of state Dean Acheson, to believe that a Communist takeover of France was imminent. A number of factors came to precipitate the expulsion of all PCF ministers from Paul Ramadier's government in May 1947. Abroad, the PCF refused to vote war credits for the First Indochina War and the violent repression of the Madagascar insurrection by the SFIO government created strains with its coalition partners. The United States were worried of communist power in France and Italy, and conditioned Marshall Plan aid to the expulsion of communists from governments in both countries. Domestically, large-scale strikes broke out at Renault factories in April 1947. The PCF was finally expelled from government in May 1947, the same time as the Italian Communist Party (PCI) were expelled from the Italian government. The PCF responded with a series of strikes and sabotages.

=== Political isolation (1947–1956) ===
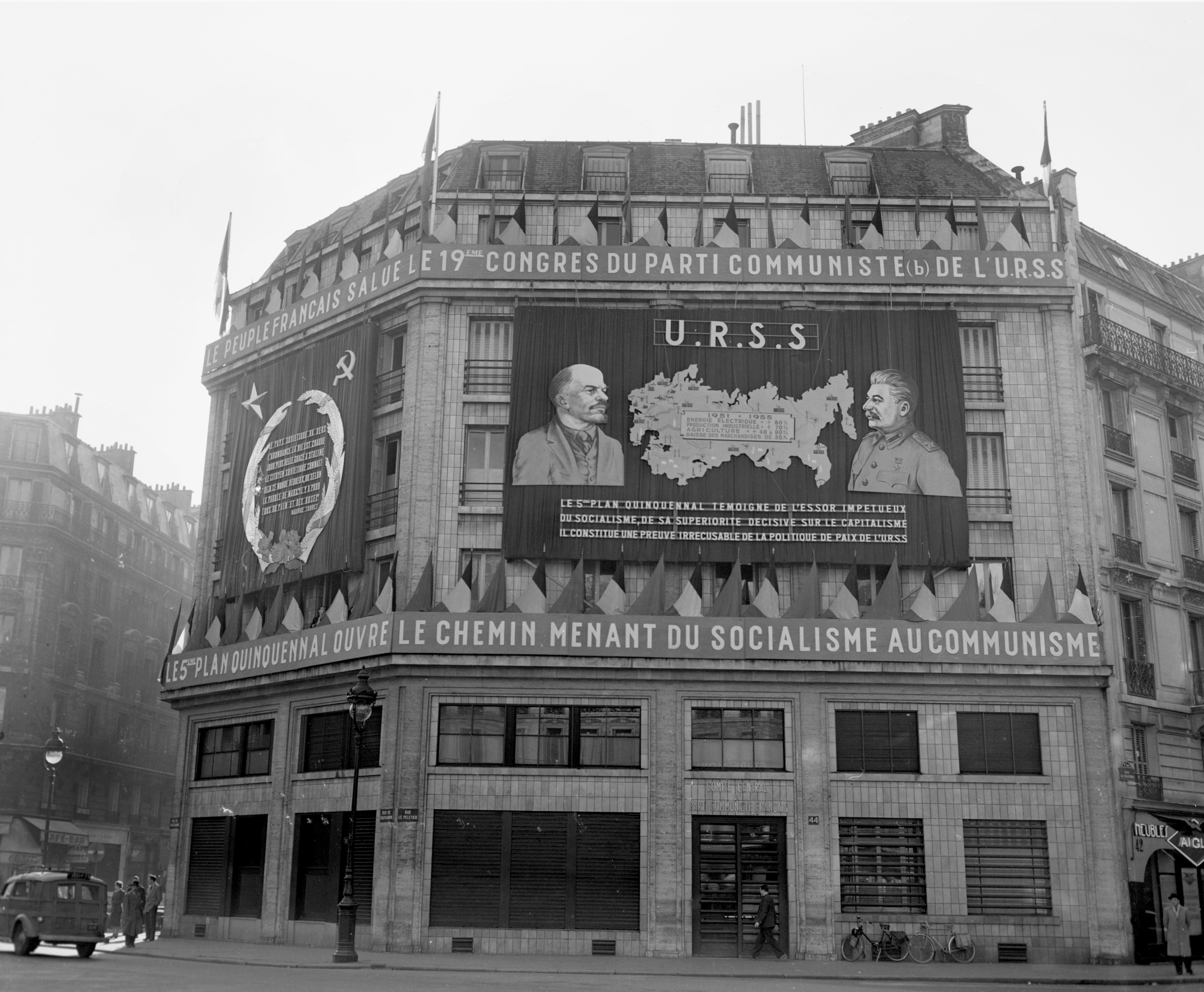
Headquarters of the French Communist Party in Paris. Photo taken in 1952.

The PCF remained isolated thereafter until François Mitterrand's electoral victory in 1981. It thus began to pursue a more militant policy, alienating it SFIO and prompting divisions and tensions on the French left. The PCF fell back on its union activities, at a time when the PCF tightly controlled the General Confederation of Labour (CGT), one of the largest and most militant unions in France.

The PCF, no longer restrained by the responsibilities of office, was free after 1947 to channel the widespread discontent among the working class with the poor economic performance of the new Fourth Republic. Furthermore, the PCF was under orders from Moscow to take a more radical course, reminiscent of the Third Period policy once pursued by the Comintern. In September 1947 several European Communist parties met in Szklarska Poręba in Poland, where a new international agency, the Cominform, was set up. During this meeting Andrei Zhdanov, standing in for Joseph Stalin, denounced the 'moderation' of the French Communists and their excessive participation in 'bourgeois' parliamentary governments, even though this policy had been previously approved by Moscow.

The PCF denounced the administration as the tool of American capitalism. Following the arrest of some steel workers in Marseille in November 1947, the CGT called a strike, as PCF activists attacked the town hall and other 'bourgeois' targets in the city. When the protests spread to Paris, and as many as 3 million workers joined the strike, Ramadier resigned.

This development was prevented by the determination of Robert Schuman, the new Prime Minister, and Jules Moch, his Minister of the Interior. It was also prevented by a growing sense of disquiet among sections of the labour movement with PCF tactics, which included the derailment in early December 1947 of the Paris-Tourcoing Express, which left twenty-one people dead. Sensing a change of mood, the CGT leadership backed down and called off the strikes. From this point forward the PCF moved into permanent opposition and political isolation, a large but impotent presence in French politics.

The party remained tightly controlled by Thorez, Duclos and Frachon (although the latter focused his activities on the CGT). Thorez remained secretary-general and uncontested leader of the PCF until his death in 1964, but he suffered hemiplegia in 1950 and was often in Moscow for treatment. Duclos, in his absence, became the de facto leader of the PCF. Under Duclos' leadership, potential rivals (André Marty and Charles Tillon) were sidelined and Auguste Lecœur, a rising star, was purged from the party in 1954.

The PCF remained a loyally Stalinist party throughout the period, and the PCF opposed the de-stalinization process begun by Moscow and other communist parties after Stalin's death in 1953. The PCF strongly supported the Soviet invasion of Hungary in 1956. A split occurred as Maoists left during the late 1950s. Some moderate communist intellectuals, such as historian Emmanuel Le Roy Ladurie, disillusioned with the policies of the Soviet Union, left the party after the violent suppression of Hungarian Revolution of 1956.

The PCF suffered losses in the 1951 election, winning 26.3% of the vote and 103 seats – a loss of 79 seats. The PCF and the Gaullist Rally of the French People (RPF) were sidelined and marginalized by the new governing coalition, the Third Force (a SFIO-Radical-MRP alliance). The Third Force's changes to the electoral law before the 1951 election were designed to weaken the PCF and RPF. Hence, the PCF lost 79 seats and won fewer seats than the SFIO (107) although it had 26.3% of the vote against only 15.4% for the SFIO. The PCF won 25.4% and 150 seats in the 1956 election. The PCF remained in opposition throughout this period, but as a major parliamentary force they contributed to the governmental instability of the Fourth Republic.

Jean-Paul Sartre, a "comrade" of the Communist party, actively supported the National Liberation Front (FLN) (the porteurs de valises networks, in which Henri Curiel took part). Long debates took place on the role of conscription. While this stance by the PCF may have helped it retain widespread popularity in metropolitan France, it lost it credibility on the radical left. Nevertheless, during his scholarship to study radio engineering in Paris (from 1949 to 1953), Pol Pot, like many other colonials educated in France (e.g. Ho Chi Minh in 1920), joined the French Communist Party.

In 1959 the PCF federation in Réunion was separated from the party, and became the Communist Party of Réunion.

== Fifth Republic (1958–present) ==
=== The Gaullist Fifth Republic (1958–1972) ===
In 1958, the PCF was the only major party which was homogeneous in its opposition to Charles de Gaulle's return to power and the foundation of the French Fifth Republic. The PCF regarded de Gaulle as a right-wing autocrat with fascist tendencies, and it had been the sworn enemy of Gaullism since 1946. However, given the widespread support for de Gaulle's return to power and the Fifth Republic, the PCF was more marginalized and isolated than ever. The NO vote in the referendum on the new constitution in September 1958 obtained only 20%. In the 1958 legislative election, the first under the new constitution, the PCF won only 18.9% and 10 seats. It was badly penalized by the new two-round system in single-member constituencies, which makes it hard for parties without any electoral alliances or deals with other parties to win many seats.

During the Algerian War, the PCF refused to support the movements that struggled for Algerian independence or to condemn French aggression against Algeria. It even voted for military budgets and military emergency powers in Algeria. This position was linked to nationalist sentiments inside the party as well as a desire not to be seen as too "radical" by the French electorate. However, this had the opposite effect as it resulted in a weakening of the PCF. Many students and other militants found themselves alienated from the party and started joining movements outside of it. This formation of a considerable left-wing movement outside the party ranks could be seen as a harbinger of May 68.

The party also faced internal dissent. Maoism became popular with some members of the party (which became especially problematic with the advent of the Sino-Soviet Split), leading to their exclusion from the PCF and the foundation of a small Maoist party in 1963. In the early 1960s, the authority of Maurice Thorez was challenged by some members of the Politburo. Laurent Casanova and Marcel Servin pleaded for a critique of Stalinism in the light of the 1956 secret speech by Khrushchev, and they considered the political positions of the Gaullists to be distinct from the atlantist line of the government of the French Fourth Republic. They were expelled from the Politburo.

Electorally, however, the PCF began to escape its political isolation and it was joined in opposition by centre-left and centrist parties. Furthermore, as political debate shifted away from the Algerian War towards socioeconomic issues, the PCF was able to recover lost supporters. In the 1962 legislative elections, the PCF obtained 21.8% of the vote and 41 seats, a substantial recovery aided by mutual withdrawal deals with the SFIO and other left-wing parties in the runoffs (which had not been the case in 1958).

In the mid-1960s the U.S. State Department estimated the party membership to be approximately 260,000 (0.9% of the working age population of France).

Some months before his death, in 1964, Thorez handed over the leadership of the PCF to Waldeck Rochet. The new secretary-general advocated a left-wing coalition against Charles de Gaulle, a reform of the party doctrine (the thesis of the unique party was abandoned). During this time, Georges Marchais gained prominence within the party, after his election to the Politburo in 1961.

In the 1965 presidential election, on the belief that a PCF candidate would not be able to do well, the PCF supported the left-wing candidacy of François Mitterrand, a former minister of the French Fourth Republic who was opposed to De Gaulle's regime since 1958. Mitterrand had never been a member of the SFIO (he was the leader of the small Convention of Republican Institutions, CIR) and he enjoyed good relations with all left-wing parties including the PCF and the SFIO. The PCF also signed an electoral agreement with the Federation of the Democratic and Socialist Left (FGDS) prior to the 1967 legislative election. Mitterrand obtained 44.8% in the runoff. The PCF won 22.5% and 73 seats.

During these years, the internal rifts over such issues as Maoism, the Algerian War and the Italian Communist Party continued to worsen. Its student movement Union des Etudiants Communistes (UEC) was in fact controlled by a "melange of young Marxist dissidents" between 1963 and 1965. The party expelled one thousand of them after the UEC's Eighth Congress (1965).

In May 68 widespread student riots and strikes broke out in France. The PCF initially supported the general strike but opposed the revolutionary student movement, which was dominated by Trotskyists, Maoists and anarchists, and the so-called "new social movements" (including environmentalists, gay movements, prisoners' movement). Georges Marchais, in L'Humanité on May 3, virulently denounced the leaders of the movement in an article entitled "False revolutionaries who must be exposed". He referred to student leader Daniel Cohn-Bendit as the "German anarchist". Although the PCF and the CGT were compelled by their base to join the movement as it expanded to take the form of a general strike, the PCF feared that it would be overwhelmed by events – especially as some on the left, led by Mitterrand were attempting to use Charles de Gaulle's initial vacillations to create a political alternative to the Gaullist regime. It welcomed Prime Minister Georges Pompidou's willingness to dialogue and it supported the Grenelle agreements. When de Gaulle regained the initiative over the situation on 30 May, by announcing the dissolution of the National Assembly and snap elections, the PCF quickly embraced the President's decision.

However, the PCF—and the left as a whole—suffered very heavy losses in the 1968 legislative elections which saw a Gaullist landslide. The PCF won 20% of the vote and lost over half its seat, holding only 34 in the new legislature.

In terms of foreign policy, under Waldeck Rochet's leadership, the PCF slowly and incompletely distanced itself from the Soviet Union. During the Prague Spring, it pleaded for conciliation, then it expressed its surprise and disapproval about the Soviet intervention—but it never firmly condemned it. Nevertheless, the PCF publicly criticized a Soviet action for the first time in its history. This event caused frictions in the Politburo: Jeannette Vermersch, Thorez's widow, resigned.

Following Charles de Gaulle's resignation after he lost a referendum on constitutional reforms, an early presidential election was held in June 1969. Because of Waldeck Rochet's ill health, senator and party elder Jacques Duclos was the party's candidate. The collapse of the FGDS after 1968 and Mitterrand's temporary fall from grace after his actions in May 1968 broke up the PCF's alliance with the left. Indeed, it was impossible for the PCF to support the SFIO's candidate, Marseille mayor Gaston Defferre, an anti-communist who governed his city in coalition with the centrists. As Defferre's candidacy rapidly foundered, Duclos, buoyed by his amiability and personal popularity, rose in the polls. Duclos won 21.3%, placing third but completely eclipsing Defferre (5%), the PSU's Michel Rocard (3.6%) and Trotskyist leader Alain Krivine (1.1%). Eliminated by the first round, the PCF refused to endorse either Gaullist candidate Georges Pompidou and the centrist caretaker President Alain Poher in the runoff, considering that they were two sides of the same coin (blanc bonnet ou bonnet blanc). Pompidou won easily, with 58.2%, but most PCF voters did not vote: abstention increased from 22.4% in the first round to 31.2% in the second round.

In 1970, Roger Garaudy, a member of the Central Committee of the PCF from 1945 on, was expelled from the party for his revisionist tendencies, being criticized for his attempt to reconcile Marxism with Roman Catholicism. From 1982 onwards, Garaudy emerged as a major Holocaust denier and was officially convicted in 1998.

=== The Common Programme, the union of the left and decline (1972–1981) ===
In 1972 Waldeck Rochet was succeeded as secretary-general by Georges Marchais, who had effectively controlled the party since 1970. Marchais began a moderate liberalization of the party's policies and internal life, although dissident members, particularly intellectuals, continued to be expelled. The PCF formed an alliance with Mitterrand's new Socialist Party (PS). They signed a Common Programme before the 1973 legislative election. The Common Programme marked the PCF's acceptance of democratic principles and civil liberties, and included major institutional, economic and social reforms. The PCF believed, like in 1936, that it would gain the upper hand over the PS and quickly decimate their socialist rivals. On the contrary, however, the PCF was weakened by the alliance with the PS. In the 1973 elections, the PCF increased its support—winning 21.4% and 73 seats—but the distance separating it from the PS was reduced, with Mitterrand's PS winning 19.2%.

Nominally the French communists supported Mitterrand's Common Programme candidacy in 1974 presidential election, but the Soviet ambassador in Paris and the director of L'Humanité did not hide their satisfaction with Mitterrand's narrow defeat at the hands of centre-right candidate Valéry Giscard d'Estaing. According to Jean Lacouture, Raymond Aron and François Mitterrand himself, the Soviet government and the French communist leaders had done everything in order to prevent Mitterrand from being elected: they regarded him as too anti-communist and too skillful in his strategy of re-balancing the Left.

As Giscard became increasingly unpopular, the left swept midterm local elections—the 1976 cantonal elections and the 1977 municipal elections, which allowed the PCF to strengthen its base in local government. But these elections also confirmed the PCF's slow decline: in the 1976 cantonal elections, the PS (26.6%) obtained more votes than the PCF (22.8%) for the first time since 1936.

Internally, the PCF sought to respond to the growing international denunciation of Soviet communism, which followed the Prague uprising (1968) and the publication of Aleksandr Solzhenitsyn's book The Gulag Archipelago in 1973. In 1976, the PCF dropped references to the dictatorship of the proletariat, affirmed its independence vis-a-vis Moscow and endorsed democratic liberties—although it did not drop revolutionary rhetoric. In L'Humanité in January 1976, for example, the party spoke of a "democratic and revolutionary way [...] to socialism" and "taking into account conditions of our time in favour of the forces of progress, liberty and peace". The PCF's goal was the "transformation of the capitalist society into a socialist society, a fraternal society without exploiters or exploited". The PCF began to follow a line closer to that of the Italian Communist Party's eurocommunism. However, this was only a relative change of direction, as the PCF remained largely loyal to Moscow, and in 1979, Georges Marchais supported the Soviet invasion of Afghanistan. Its assessment of the Soviet and Eastern European communist governments was "positive overall".

During Mitterrand's term as PS first secretary, the PS re-emerged as the dominant party of the left. Worried about these trends, Marchais demanded updates to the Common Programme, but the negotiations failed, ending the union of the left. The PS accused Marchais of being responsible for the division of the left and of its defeat at the 1978 legislative election. In the 1978 election, for the first time in a legislative election since 1936, the PCF was surpassed by the PS as the largest party on the left (20.6% for the PCF, 22.6% for the PS). Nonetheless, the PCF won 86 seats.

Marchais was the party's candidate in the 1981 presidential election, facing off against, among others, Giscard and Mitterrand. The PCF envisioned the 1981 election as the opportunity for it to regain its leadership of the left, and it was encouraged by Marchais' rising poll numbers (from 15% to 19%). He ran a populist campaign, which attacked the PS—in particular its alleged shift to the right—as much as the incumbent right-wing President. Marchais' attacks on Mitterrand were often so harsh that many Socialists felt that Marchais was playing into Giscard's hands by attacking Mitterrand. To counter such accusations, Marchais proclaimed himself as the "anti-Giscard candidate" and, late into his campaign, attacked the incumbent as the "president of injustice".

The election was a massive disaster for the PCF. Marchais won only 15.4% in the first round, in fourth place. Reluctantly, Marchais endorsed Mitterrand in the runoff, facilitating Mitterrand's narrow victory with 51.8% on 10 May 1981.

=== Ephemeral governmental experience and decline (1981–1994) ===
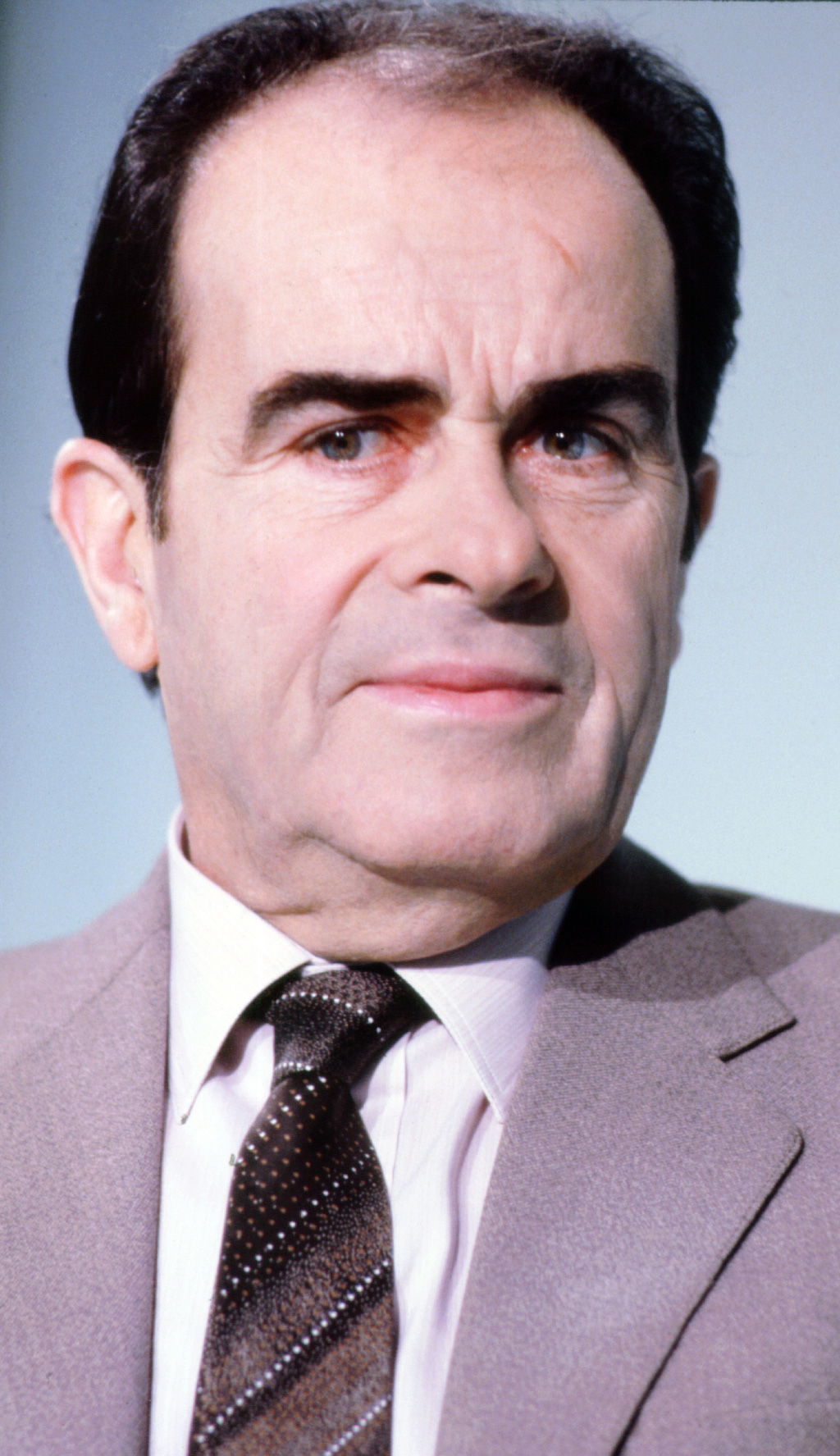
Georges Marchais, leader 1972–1994

The snap legislative election in June 1981 was another major setback for the PCF, which marked the end of the PCF's dreams of regaining leadership of the left. A number of PCF supporters had already defected to the PS and Mitterrand by the first round of the presidential election, and the party was unable to stop the bleeding. In the legislative elections, the PCF won only 16.2% of the vote and 44 seats, a far cry from the PS' 285 seats.

After the legislative elections, the PCF obtained cabinet positions in Pierre Mauroy's new government, their first cabinet participation since 1947. The four Communist ministers were Charles Fiterman (transportation), Anicet Le Pors (Public sector), Jack Ralite (health) and Marcel Rigout (professional development). Although some on the right worried about the PCF's participation in government and decried the PS' alliance with the PCF, Mitterrand outmaneuvered the PCF at every turn. As the government's initial leftist Keynesian economic policies proved unsuccessful, with rising unemployment and deindustrialization. Between 1982 and 1983, PS finance minister Jacques Delors changed course in favour of orthodox fiscal and economic policies and austerity measures (rigueur économique).

In the 1982 cantonal elections, the PCF won only 15.9% and lost 45 general councillors. It suffered more losses in the 1983 municipal elections. The party suffered another major defeat in the 1984 European elections, in which Georges Marchais' PCF list won only 11.2%, closely followed by the far-right National Front (FN) which broke through to win 11%. In July 1984, with Laurent Fabius replacing Mauroy as Prime Minister, the PCF resigned from the government. The PCF joined the ranks of the opposition, largely abstaining in the National Assembly.

The PCF fell under another symbolic threshold in the 1986 legislative election, winning only 9.8% and 35 seats. But Marchais refused to budge, and the PCF remained loyal to Moscow until the end.

The PCF leadership imposed André Lajoinie's candidacy in the 1988 presidential election, despite the opposition of the moderate "renewers" led by Pierre Juquin who advocated in favour of eurocommunism and eco-socialism. Juquin ran as a dissident against the PCF's official candidate, receiving support from small far-left (Trotskyist), red green/eco socialist and New Left movements. Lajoinie, a poor candidate, obtained only 6.8% while Juquin took 2.1%. The PCF, however, had a brief respite in the subsequent 1988 legislative election, in which it managed 11.3% but lost more seats, winning only 27. Between 1988 and 1993, the PCF did not participate in PS governments, but offered piecemeal case-by-case parliamentary support to the PS. The 1989 European elections marked another low for the PCF, whose list won only 7.7% and elected 7 MEPs.

The Communists were unable to benefit from President Mitterrand and the PS' unpopularity after 1991–1992. In the 1993 legislative elections, marked by a monumental defeat of the PS, the PCF won only 9.3% and 24 seats.

The fall of the Soviet Union in 1991 led to a crisis in the PCF, but it did not follow the example of some other European communist parties by dissolving itself or changing its name. At the XXVIII^{th} Congress in 1994, Marchais stepped down as secretary-general in favour of Robert Hue.

=== Renewal, recovery and collapse (1994–2002) ===
Robert Hue sought to transform and renew the party. In his book Communisme : la mutation, he condemned the Soviet Union, in particular its rejection of individualism, human rights and liberal democracy. Under Hue the party embarked on a process called la mutation. La mutation included the thorough reorganization of party structure and move away from Marxist-Leninist dogma. Democratic centralism was abandoned, the leadership structures revamped and renamed and public criticism of the party line was allowed with the formation of party factions. This move was intended to revitalize the PCF and attract non-affiliated leftists to the party. However, it largely failed to stop the party's decline.

In the 1995 presidential election, Hue managed an acceptable 8.6%, a result superior to Lajoinie's 1988 result but inferior to Lajoinie and Juquin's combined support in 1988.

Under Hue's leadership, the PCF also renewed its alliance with other left-wing forces, primarily the PS, as part of the Plural Left (Gauche plurielle) coalition. In the 1997 legislative election, the PCF enjoyed a brief recovery, winning 9.9% and 35 seats. Under Lionel Jospin's left-wing government between 1997 and 2002, the PCF returned to government with Jean-Claude Gayssot as Minister of Transportation; Marie-George Buffet as Minister of Youth and Sports; Michelle Demessine (later Jacques Brunhes) as secretary of state for tourism; and, after 2000, Michel Duffour as secretary of state for heritage and cultural decentralization.

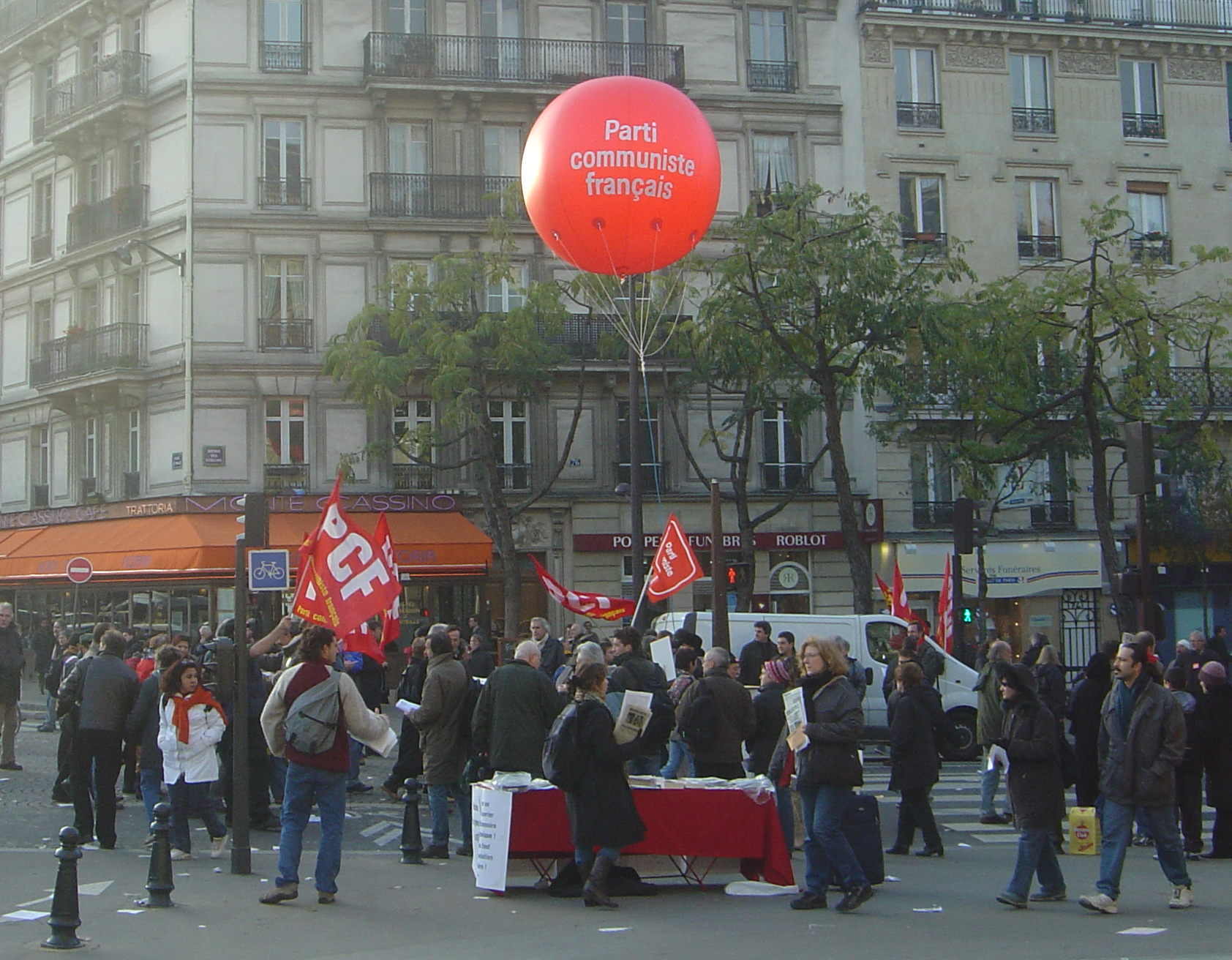
During a street protest in 2005 in Paris

The PCF's brief recovery proved short lived. The party became riddled with internal conflict, as many sectors – notably the "orthodox" faction – opposed la mutation and the policy of co-governing with the Socialists. In the 1999 European election, the PCF list, despite its attempt to open to social movements and non-communist activists, won only 6.8% and 6 MEPs. 1999 was followed by the 2002 presidential elections, in which Hue won only 3.4% in the first round. For the first time, the PCF candidate obtained fewer votes than the Trotskyist candidates (Arlette Laguiller and Olivier Besancenot), and by virtue of falling under 5% its campaign expenses were not reimbursed by the state.

In the 2002 legislative elections, the PCF won only 4.8% of the vote and 21 seats. Hue himself lost his seat in Argenteuil.

Hue had already resigned the party's leadership in October 2001 to Marie-George Buffet and was completely sidelined from the party after the 2002 rout.

=== Attempts to stop the decline (2002–2008) ===
Under Buffet's leadership after 2003, the PCF shifted away from the PS and Hue's mutation. Instead, it attempted to actively reach out to and embrace social movements, trade unions and non-communist activists as a strategy to counter the PCF's decline. The party sought to create a broader alliance including 'anti-liberal' and anti-capitalist actors from civil society or trade unions.

One of the shifts in the PCF's strategy after 2003 came in the form of a more militant Euroscepticism (in 2001, the PCF had only abstained rather than voted against the Treaty of Nice while they were in government). As such, in 2005, the PCF played a leading role in the left-wing NO campaign in the referendum on the Treaty establishing a Constitution for Europe (TCE). The victory of the NO vote, along with a campaign against the Bolkestein directive, earned the party some positive publicity.

In 2005, a labour conflict at the SNCM in Marseille, followed by a 4 October 2005 demonstration against the New Employment Contract (CNE) marked the opposition to Dominique de Villepin's right-wing government; Villepin shared his authority with Nicolas Sarkozy, who, as Minister of the Interior and leader of the right-wing Union for a Popular Movement (UMP) was a favourite for the upcoming presidential election. Marie-George Buffet also criticized the government's response to the fall 2005 riots, speaking of a deliberate "strategy of tension" employed by Sarkozy, who had called the youth from the housing projects "scum" (racaille) which needed to be cleaned up with a Kärcher high pressure hose. While most of the Socialist deputies voted for the declaration of a state of emergency during the riots, which lasted until January 2006, the PCF, along with the Greens, opposed it.

In 2006, the PCF and other left-wing groups supported protests against the First Employment Contract, which finally forced president Chirac to scrap plans for the bill, aimed at creating a more flexible labour law.

Nevertheless, the PCF's new strategy did not bring about a major electoral recovery. In the 2004 regional elections, the PCF ran some independent lists in the first round – some of them expanded to civil society actors, like Marie-George Buffet's list in Île-de-France. The results were rather positive for the party, which won nearly 11% in Nord-Pas-de-Calais and Picardy, 9% in Auvergne and 7.2% in Île-de-France. In the 2004 cantonal elections, the PCF won 7.8% nationally and 108 seats; a decent performance, although it was below the party's result in previous cantonal elections in 2001 (9.8%) and 1998 (10%). The PCF did poorly in the 2004 European elections, winning only 5.88% and only 2 out of 78 seats.

The new strategy, likewise, also faced internal resistance on two fronts: on the one hand from the party's traditionalist and Marxist-Leninist "orthodox" faction and from the refondateurs/rénovateurs ("refounders" or "rebuilders") who wanted to create a united front with parties and movements on the left of the PS.

Buoyed by the success of the left-wing NO campaign in 2005, the PCF and other left-wing nonistes from 2005 attempted to create "anti-liberal collectives" which could run a common 'anti-liberal left' candidate in the 2007 presidential election. Buffet, backed by the PCF (except for the réfondateurs), proposed her candidacy and emerged as the winner in most preparatory votes organized by these collective structures. However, the entire effort soon fell into disarray before collapsing completely. The far-left – represented by Oliver Besancenot (Revolutionary Communist League) and Arlette Laguiller (Workers' Struggle) was unwilling to participate in the efforts to begin with, preferring their own independent candidacies. José Bové, initially a supporter of the anti-liberal collectives, later withdrew from the process and announced his independent candidacy. The PCF's leadership and members voted in favour of maintaining Buffet's candidacy, despite the failure of the anti-liberal collectives and called on other left-wing forces to support her candidacy. This support was not forthcoming, and after a low-key campaign she won only 1.93%, even lower than Robert Hue's 3.4% in the previous presidential election. Once again, the low result meant that the PCF did not meet the 5% threshold for reimbursement of its campaign expenses.

The presidential rout was followed by an equally poor performance in the subsequent legislative elections, in which it won only 4.3% of the vote and 15 seats. Having fallen the 20-seat threshold to form its own group in the National Assembly, the PCF was compelled to ally itself with The Greens and other left-wing MPs to form a parliamentary group, called Democratic and Republican Left group (GDR). The PCF's poor showing in 2007 weighed a lot on its budget.

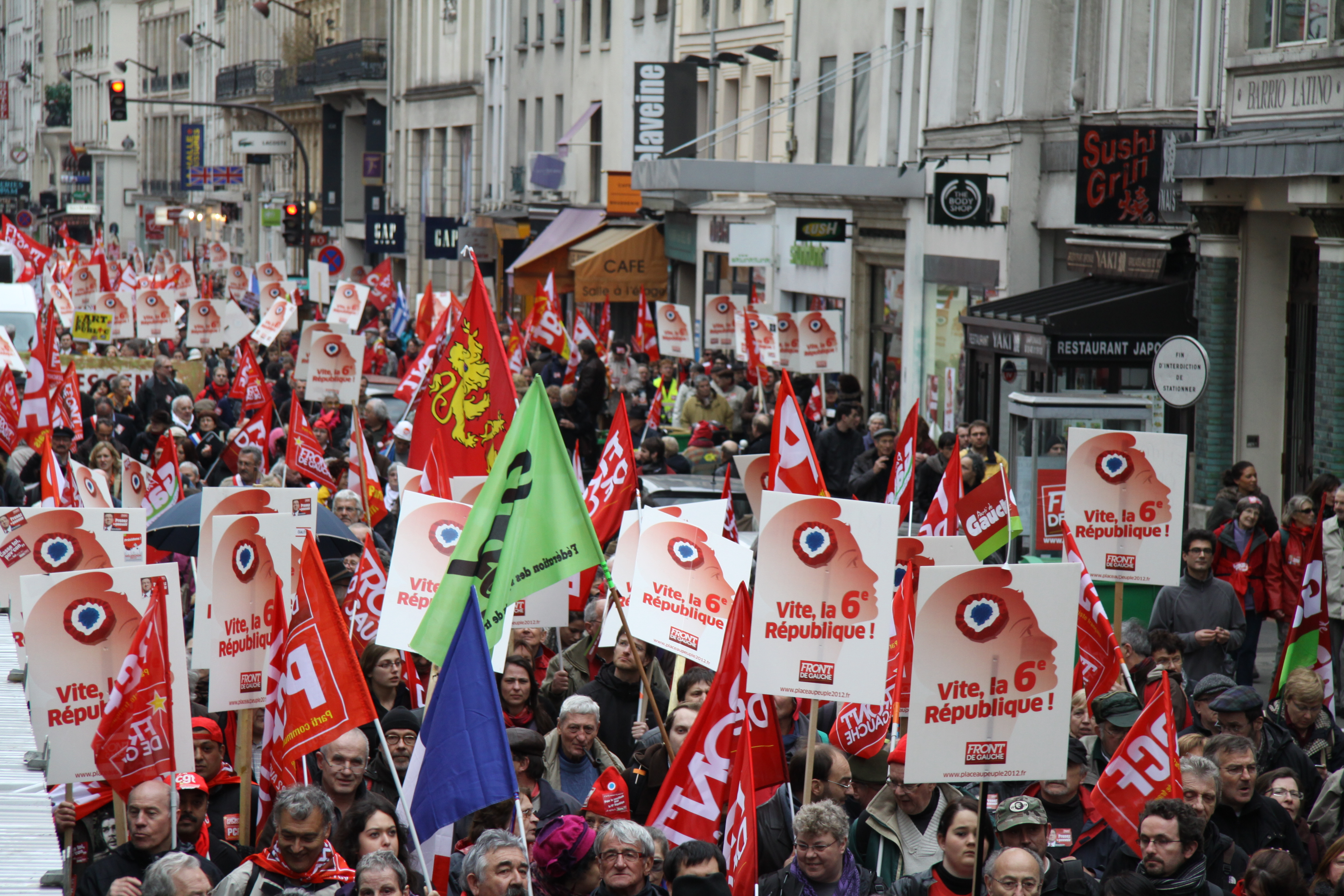
French Communist Party in Paris 2012

In the 2008 municipal elections, the PCF fared better than expected but nevertheless had contrasted results overall. It gained Dieppe, Saint Claude, Firminy and Vierzon as well as other smaller towns and kept most of its large towns, such as Arles, Bagneux, Bobigny, Champigny-sur-Marne, Echirolles, Fontenay-sous-Bois, Gardanne, Gennevilliers, Givors, Malakoff, Martigues, Nanterre, Stains and Vénissieux. However, the PCF lost some key communes in the second round, such as Montreuil, Aubervilliers and particularly Calais, where an UMP candidate ousted the PCF after 37 years. In the cantonal elections on the same day, the PCF won 8.8% and 117 seats, a small increase on the 2004 results.

=== Left Front (2009–2016) ===
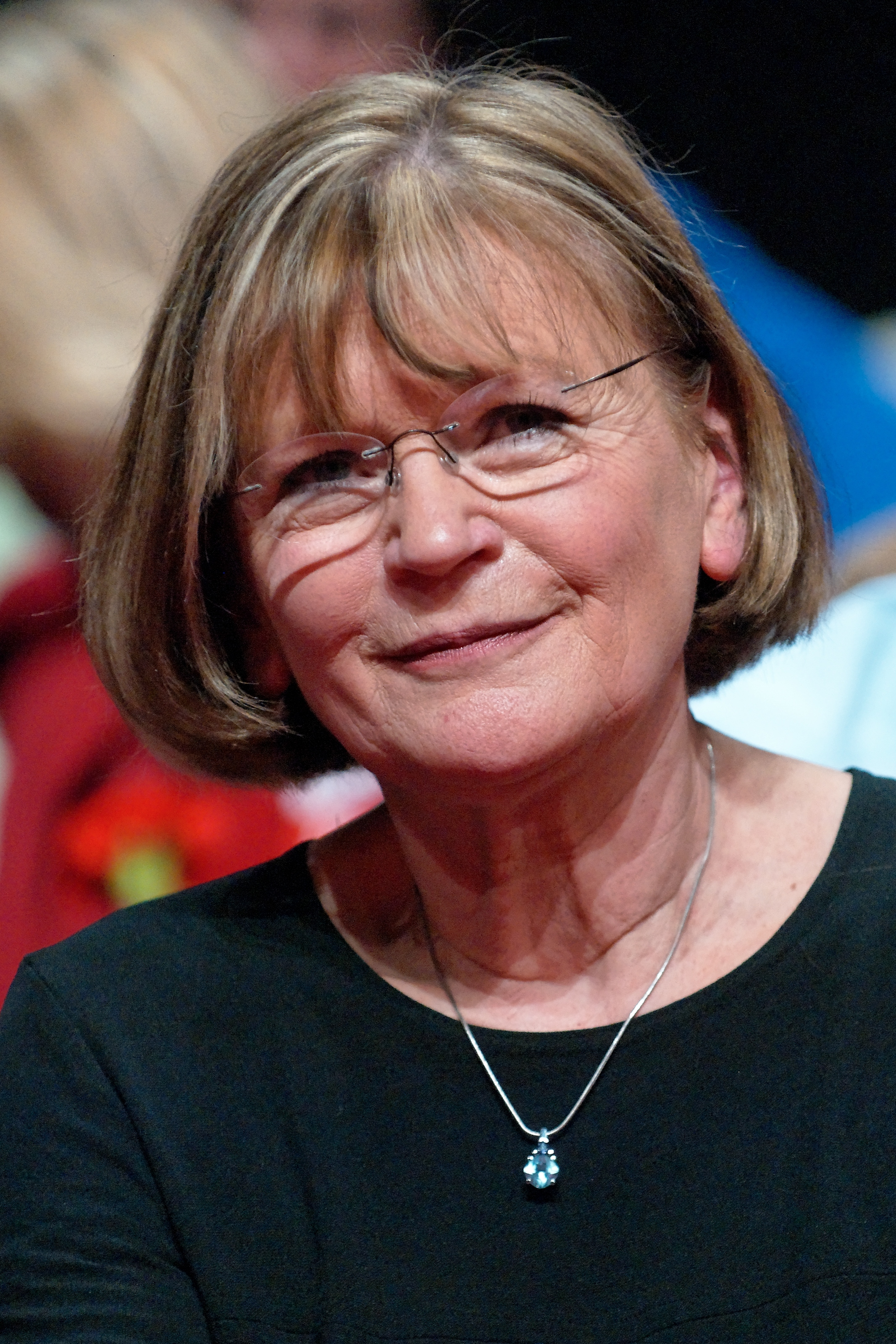
Marie-George Buffet at the launch of the FG, 2009

The PCF, to counter its slow decline, sought to build a broader electoral coalition with other (smaller) left-wing or far-left parties. In October 2008, and again at the PCF's XXXIV Congress in December 2008, the PCF issued a call for the creation of a "civic and progressive front". The Left Party (PG), led by PS dissident Jean-Luc Mélenchon, and other small parties including the Unitary Left responded positively to the call, forming the Left Front (Front de gauche, FG), at first for the 2009 European Parliament election. The FG has since turned into a permanent electoral coalition, extended for the 2010 regional elections, 2011 cantonal elections, 2012 presidential election 2012 legislative election and the 2014 European Parliament election.

The FG allowed the PCF to halt its decline, but perhaps with a price. The FG won 6.5% in the 2009 European elections, 5.8% in the 2010 regional elections and 8.9% in the 2011 cantonal elections. However, paying the price of its greater electoral and political independence vis-a-vis the PS, it fell from 185 to 95 regional councillors after the 2010 elections.

Nevertheless, the FG strategy caused further tension and even dissent within PCF ranks. Up to the higher echelons of the PCF leadership, some were uneasy with Mélenchon's potential candidacy in the 2012 presidential election and the PCF disagreed with Mélenchon's PG on issues such as participation in PS-led regional executives. In 2010, a number of leading réfondateurs within the PCF (Patrick Braouezec, Jacqueline Fraysse, François Asensi, Roger Martelli...) left the party to join the small Federation for a Social and Ecological Alternative (FASE).

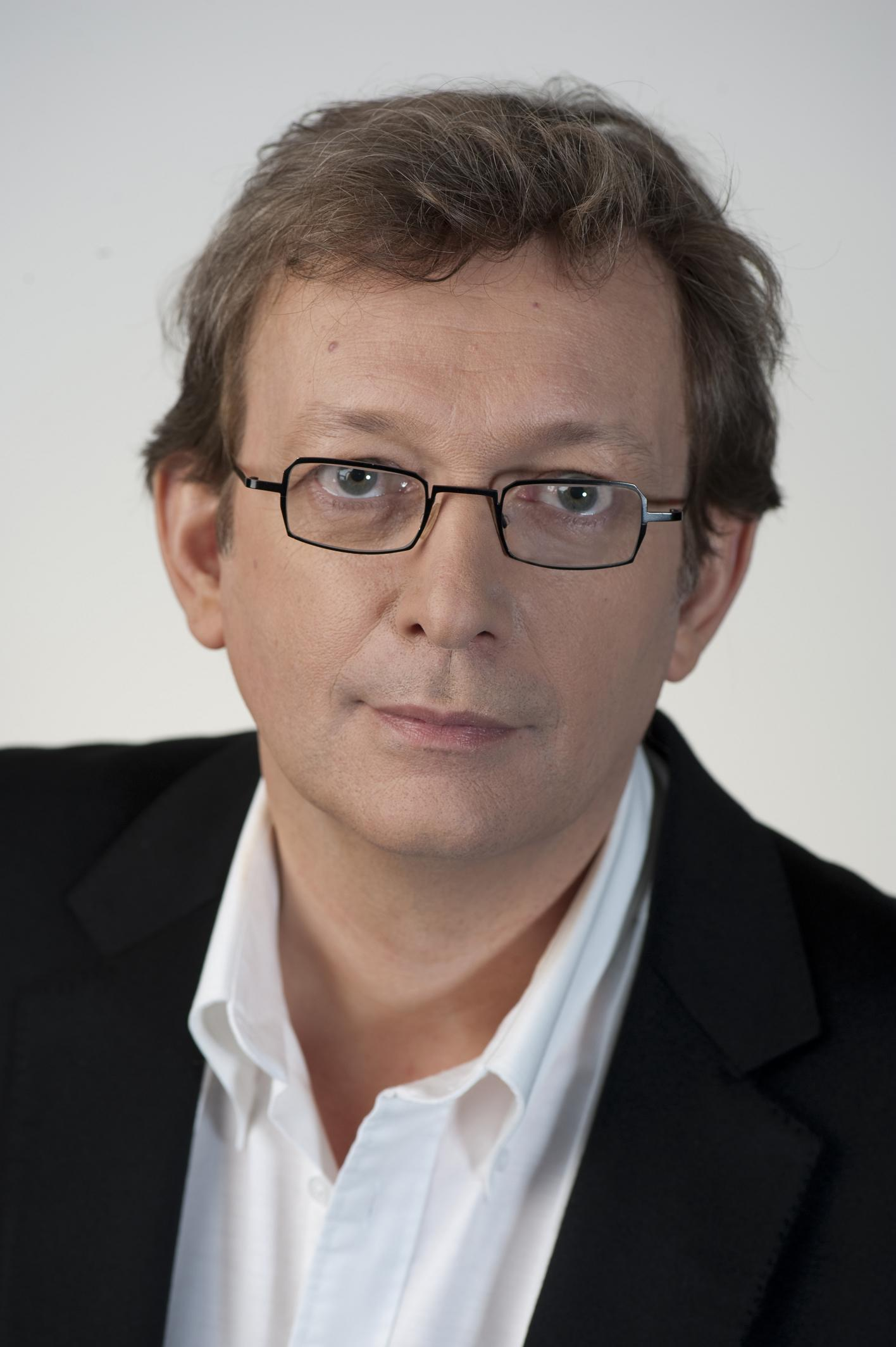
Pierre Laurent, party leader until 2018

At the PCF's XXXV Congress in 2010, Buffet stepped down in favour of Pierre Laurent, a former journalist.

In 2010, the PCF played a leading role in the protests against Éric Woerth's pension reform, which raised the retirement age by two years.

On 5 June 2011, the PCF's national delegates approved, with 63.6% against, a resolution which included an endorsement of Mélenchon's candidacy as the FG's candidate in the 2012 presidential election. A few days later, on 16–18 June, an internal primary open to all PCF members was held, ratifying Mélenchon's candidacy. Mélenchon's candidacy for the FG, the position endorsed by the PCF leadership, won 59%. PCF deputy André Chassaigne took 36.8% and Emmanuel Dang Tran, an "orthodox" Communist, won only 4.1%. Mélenchon won 11.1% in the first round of the presidential election on 22 April 2012.

The 2012 legislative election in June saw the FG win 6.9%, a result below Mélenchon's first round result but significantly higher than the PCF's result in 2007. Nevertheless, the PCF – which made up the bulk of FG incumbents and candidates – faced a strong challenge from the PS in its strongholds in the first round, and, unexpectedly, found a number of its incumbents place behind the PS candidate in the first round. Applying the traditional rule of "mutual withdrawal", FG/PCF candidates who won fewer votes than another left-wing candidates withdrew from the runoff. As a result, the FG was left with only 10 seats – 7 of those for the PCF. It was the PCF's worst seat count in its entire history.

Despite this defeat, the PCF leadership remains supportive of the FG strategy. Pierre Laurent was reelected unopposed at the XXXVI Congress in February 2013. On the same occasion, the hammer and sickle were removed from party membership cards. Pierre Laurent stated that "It is an established and revered symbol that continues to be used in all of our demonstrations, but it doesn't illustrate the reality of who we are today. It isn't so relevant to a new generation of communists."

In 2014 European Parliament election, the Left Front managed to retain same number of votes and to lose two seats. Both of them were held by the PCF candidates.

In 2015 regional election, the Left Front and the PCF combined won just over 4 per cent of the vote, what was the low point of coalition.

In 2016, just year ahead of 2017 presidential election, the Left Front's (and the Left Party's) member Jean-Luc Mélenchon announced creation of the new party, the La France Insoumise. This left to the rift between the parties and de facto coalition disintegrated.

=== Independent performance and renewed cooperation with the Socialists (since 2017) ===
Since 2017, the party decided to run independent campaigns on national level. It came with abysmal results. For example, in 2019 European Parliament election the PCF won just over half of million votes (by itself this result was the worst since 1920s). On regional level the party again run joint lists with the Socialist Party, which became weaker after 2017 presidential election.

In the 2022 French presidential election, the PCF's presidential candidate Fabien Roussel won just 2.28% of the vote, narrowly beating the French Socialist Party's candidate Anne Hidalgo. In the run up to the 2022 French legislative election, the party joined the NUPES electoral alliance alongside other left-leaning parties. The party won 12 seats, up two compared to the previous election.
