= André Frossard =

French journalist and essayist (1915–1995)

- Born: 14 January 1915; Saint-Maurice-Colombier, France
- Died: 2 February 1995 (aged 80); Versailles, France
- Occupations: Essayist, student

Signature
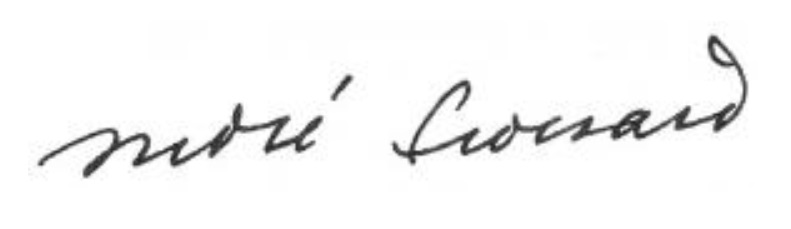

André Frossard (French pronunciation: [ɑ̃dʁe fʁɔsaʁ]; 14 January 1915 – 2 February 1995) was a French journalist and essayist.

== Early life ==
André Frossard was born on 14 January 1915 in Saint-Maurice-Colombier, Doubs, France. His father, Louis-Oscar Frossard, was one of the founders of the French Communist Party and served as its first Secretary-General. Later he held a series of ministerial positions in the Government of the Popular Front. Frossard's paternal grandmother was Jewish, and his home village in Foussemagne, France was the only village in France with a synagogue but no church. After attending the École nationale supérieure des arts décoratifs to complete his education, Frossard began a career in journalism as a cartoonist and columnist.

== Conversion to Roman Catholicism ==
Raised as an atheist, at the age of 20 Frossard converted to Catholicism and was baptized in the chapel of the Sisters of Adoration on 8 July 1935. He explained his conversion in the title of his 1969 bestseller Dieu existe, je l'ai rencontré (God Exists, I Met Him).

== French Resistance ==
Frossard joined the French Navy in September 1936 and entered into the French Resistance upon demobilization. He was arrested by the Gestapo in Lyon on 10 December 1943. He was interned in the "Jew Shed" of Montluc prison and was one of seven survivors of a massacre in Bron on 2 August 1944, in which 72 were killed. He was awarded the Legion of Honor and promoted to the rank of officer by General Charles de Gaulle.

== After World War II ==
After the war, Frossard worked at L'Aurore before joining Figaro and Le Monde. He attended many conferences in France and abroad, mainly in Italy, where the city of Ravenna elected him an honorary citizen in 1986. Frossard presented televisions shows like Voyage sans passeport.

Frossard was elected to the Académie française Seat 2 to the chair of the René de La Croix de Castries on 18 June 1987, and was received into the institution on 10 March 1988 by Catholic Father Ambroise-Marie Carré.

By 1990, Frossard had written about 15,000 newspaper articles and several books, mostly regarding religion. In 1990, Pope John Paul II awarded him the Grand Cross of the Equestrian Order of the Holy Sepulchre.

== Death ==
Frossard died in Versailles on 2 February 1995 and is buried in the cemetery of Caluire-et-Cuire.

== Honours and awards ==
- Officier of the Order of Legion of Honour
- Croix de Guerre 1939-1945
- Resistance Medal
- Grand-Croix of the Order of Pope Pius IX

== Bibliography ==
- La Maison des otages (1946)
- Histoire paradoxale de la IVe République (1954)
- Le Sel de la terre (1956)
- Voyage au pays de Jésus (1958)
- Les Greniers du Vatican (1960)
- Votre humble serviteur, Vincent de Paul (1960)
- Dieu existe, je l'ai rencontré (1969)
- La France en général (1975)
- Il y a un autre monde (1976)
- Les trente-six preuves de l'existence du diable (1978)
- L'art de croire (1979)
- N'ayez pas peur, dialogue avec Jean-Paul II (1982)
- La Baleine et le Ricin (1982)
- L'Évangile selon Ravenne (1984)
- Le Chemin de croix, au Colisée avec Jean-Paul II (1986)
- N'oubliez pas l'amour, la Passion de Maximilien Kolbe (1987)
- Le Crime contre l'humanité (1988)
- Portrait de Jean-Paul II (1988)
- Le Cavalier du Quai Conti (1988)
- Dieu en questions (1990)
- Le Monde de Jean-Paul II (1991)
- Les grands bergers (1992)
- Excusez-moi d'être français (1992)
- Défense du Pape (1993)
- L'Evangile inachevé (1995)

== Honours and awards ==
- Officier de la Légion d'honneur
- Croix de guerre 1939-1945
- Médaille de la Résistance
