= Arthur Ramette =

French politician (1897–1988)

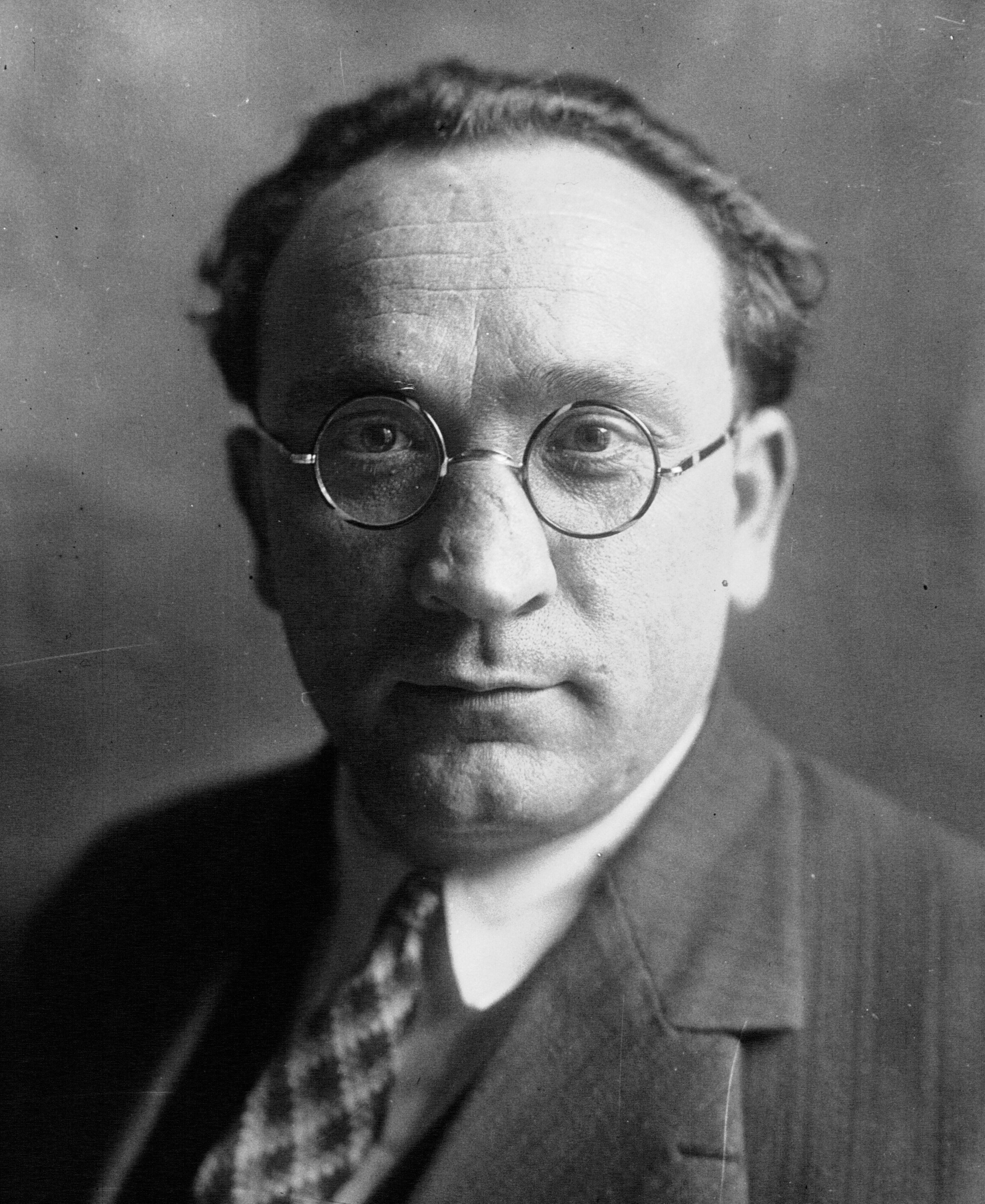
- Ramette in 1932
- Born: Arthur Jean Baptiste Ramette; 12 October 1897; Caudry, Nord, France
- Died: 15 December 1988 (aged 91); Seclin, Nord, France
- Occupations: Magazine editor, politician
- Political party: French Communist Party

Arthur Jean Baptiste Ramette (12 October 1897 – 15 December 1988) was a French mechanic and communist politician. He was a leading representative of the French Communist Party in the National Assembly both before and after World War II (1939–45).

== Life ==
=== Early years (1897–1919) ===
Arthur Ramette was born in Caudry, Nord, on 12 October 1897. His father was a plasterer. Arthur Ramette obtained an elementary education certificate, then in 1909 was apprenticed as a mechanic at the age of 12. He was a militant socialist, and was appointed secretary of the metalworkers union of Cambrai. He joined the Caudry branch of the French Section of the Workers' International (Section Française de l'Internationale Ouvrière, SFIO) in 1919, and became a member of the Third International Committee.

=== Inter-war period (1919–1939) ===
When the SFIO split at the Tours Congress in December 1920 Ramette joined the French Communist Party (Parti communiste français, PCF). He was made secretary of the Caudry branch of the PCF from 1922 to 1924. He ran in the national elections of 1924 as deputy for the Nord department, but was narrowly defeated. He was PCF secretary of the Caudry radius from 1924 to 1926, when he became PCF secretary for the Nord region. He became the editor of the weekly L'Enchaîné, holding this position until 1939.

Ramette ran as PCF candidate in the Lens municipal elections in 1928. Due to his activity among the textile, mining and agricultural workers he drew the attention of the authorities. He was imprisoned for a month after a demonstration on 1 May 1929. In 1931 he was sentenced to two years in prison and a 500 franc fine for his actions during a strike of the Roubaix textile workers. He joined the Central Committee of the PCF in 1931, and was made the director of the Nord region. He was appointed to the Politburo in 1932, where he remained until 1950.

While in prison, Ramette ran in the 1932 general elections as candidate for the 2nd district of Douai, and was elected on the communist platform. The validity of his election was challenged, and he was not confirmed in his seat until a year later. He ran unsuccessfully for a Senate seat in Nord in October 1932. He was again elected deputy for Nord on the communist platform in 1936. Ramette visited Moscow that year, arriving at the end of May 1936. He met with Georgi Dimitrov, Dmitry Manuilsky, Boris Stepanov, Palmiro Togliatti, André Marty and Raymond Guyot, and discussed the importance of the peace movement in France.

Throughout the second legislature Ramette was secretary of the Chamber. He introduced fifteen bills and more than twenty reports, and made frequent interventions. Ramette was an internationalist, and spoke out for the rights of foreign workers. In November 1936 he condemned the "odious ... xenophobic campaigns" against them, but also said, "we do not deny the necessity of protecting French workers from the competition of foreign workers." He said that the relatively large numbers of foreign workers in some industries was due to their lack of rights, arguing, "If you do not want foreign labor to compete with French labor, you must accept the principle of equal treatment between French and foreign workers. ... Then management would no longer have a preference."

Ramette became a member of the general council of Douai in 1937. At the start of 1938 Camille Chautemps stated in the Chamber, "M. Ramette demands his freedom; he has a perfect right to ask for it. As for me, I give it to him." This was interpreted as an attack on the Popular Front. In response, the Socialists withdrew their ministers from the government, which was forced to resign.

=== World War II (1939–45) ===
World War II broke out in September 1939 a few days after the Molotov–Ribbentrop Pact between the Soviet Union and Germany. On 26 September 1939 the government dissolved the PCF. After the Communist Party was dissolved by the government, the Communist group in the Chamber was replaced by the French Workers' and Peasants' Group, whose president was Ramette and general secretary was Florimond Bonte. On 4 October 1939 the PCF leader Maurice Thorez, who had been mobilized, deserted the army. Ramette drove the car that took Thorez to Belgium, from where both men made their way to Moscow. The communist deputies and senators lost their parliamentary immunity on 30 November 1939, and by the law of 20 January 1940 they were expelled from parliament as of 20 February 1940. On 4 April 1940 Ramette was found guilt of contempt of the decree that dissolved the PCF and sentenced in absentia to five years in prison and a 5,000 franc fine.

Ramette returned to France in November 1944. He resumed leadership of the Fédération du Nord until 1949. He provided political direction to the communist daily Liberté, published in Lille, then became general director of the newspaper until 1956.

=== Postwar period (1945–88) ===
Ramette was a member of the General Councils of Douai and the Nord department from 1945 to 1955. He was a member of the Provisional Consultative Assembly, and in October 1945 was elected to the first Constituent Assembly. He became secretary of the communist group chaired by Jacques Duclos. He was elected secretary of the Constituent Assembly. In June 1946 he was reelected to the second Constituent Assembly. In November 1946 he was elected a deputy in the National Assembly. He was also elected municipal councilor of Lille in 1947, holding this position until 1965. He was secretary of the National Assembly from 1949 to 1950. In 1950 he was replaced in the PCF Politburo by Jeannette Vermeersch, but remained a member of the PCF Central Committee until 1967. Ramette failed to be reelected to the National Assembly in July 1951.

Ramette was elected Senator for the Nord department on 18 May 1952. He held office until 1 March 1956, when he resigned on being elected a deputy. He was a deputy for Nord from 1956 to 1958. He was defeated in the 1958 elections. He was again elected to the National Assembly on 25 November 1962, holding office until the legislature was dissolved on 2 April 1967. He was reelected on 12 March 1967, holding office until the legislature was dissolved on 30 April 1968. He was reelected on 30 June 1968, holding office until the end of the legislature on 1 April 1973. He was made a Chevalier of the Legion of Honour in 1983. He died in Seclin, Nord, on 15 December 1988, aged 91.

== Publications ==
- Arthur Ramette (1934). A la porte, les étrangers ? programme absurde, solution inhumaine (in French). Paris: Impr. d'art Voltaire. p. 20.
- Arthur Ramette; Maurice Thorez (1934). Les communistes contre la guerre (in French). Paris: Publications révolutionnaires. p. 32.
- Arthur Ramette (1935). La crise à la campagne, la situation tragique des ouvriers agricoles (in French). Paris: Publications révolutionnaires. p. 20.
- Arthur Ramette (1936). Pour la liberté. Comité populaire de propagande. p. 82.
- Ambroise Croizat; Jacques Duclos; Gabriel Péri; Arthur Ramette; Waldeck Rochet (4 November 1937). Le Peuple attend (in French). Paris: Impr. centrale du Croissant; 120, rue Lafayette. p. 32.

== Sources ==
- "Arthur Ramette" (in French). BnF.
- Jolly, Jean (1977). "Arthur RAMETTE". Dictionnaire des parlementaires français de 1889 à 1940 (in French).
- "RAMETTE (Arthur, Jean, Baptiste)". Biographie de la IVe République. Assemblée Nationale.
- Larmour, Peter J. (1964). The French Radical Party in the 1930s. Stanford University Press. ISBN 978-0-8047-0206-5.
- Lewis, Mary Dewhurst (2007). The Boundaries of the Republic: Migrant Rights and the Limits of Universalism in France, 1918-1940. Stanford University Press. p. 147. ISBN 978-0-8047-5722-5.
- "M. Arthur Ramette". Assemblée Nationale.
- "M. Arthur Ramette". Assemblée Nationale.
- "M. Arthur Ramette". Assemblée Nationale.
- "RAMETTE Arthur" (in French). French Senate.
- Santamaria, Yves (1993). "Le Parti, la France at la guerre...". Les Archives du communisme. L'AGE D'HOMME. ISBN 978-2-8251-0428-6.
