= Ludovic-Oscar Frossard =

French socialist and communist politician (1889-1946)

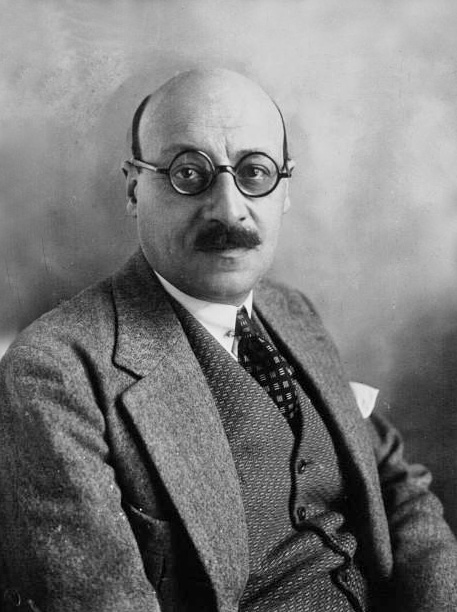
- Frossard c. 1929

Minister of Public Works and Information
- In office 16 June – 10 July 1940
- President: Albert Lebrun
- Prime Minister: Philippe Pétain
- Preceded by: Position established
- Succeeded by: Position abolished

Minister of Public Works
- In office 5 June – 16 June 1940
- President: Albert Lebrun
- Prime Minister: Paul Reynaud
- Preceded by: Anatole de Monzie
- Succeeded by: Maurice Schwartz
- In office 10 April – 23 August 1938
- President: Albert Lebrun
- Prime Minister: Édouard Daladier
- Preceded by: Jules Moch
- Succeeded by: Anatole de Monzie

Minister of Information (Note: Also named Minister for Propaganda.)
- In office 21 March – 5 June 1940
- President: Albert Lebrun
- Prime Minister: Paul Reynaud; Philippe Pétain
- Preceded by: Jean Giraudoux
- Succeeded by: Jean Prouvost
- In office 13 March – 8 April 1938
- President: Albert Lebrun
- Prime Minister: Léon Blum
- Preceded by: Position established
- Succeeded by: Position vacated

Minister of State
- In office 18 January – 10 March 1938 Serving with Georges Bonnet
- President: Albert Lebrun
- Prime Minister: Camille Chautemps
- Preceded by: Albert Sarraut; Maurice Viollette; Paul Faure
- Succeeded by: Théodore Steeg; Maurice Viollette; Paul Faure

Minister of Labour
- In office 1 June 1935 – 4 June 1936
- President: Albert Lebrun
- Prime Minister: Fernand Bouisson; Pierre Laval; Albert Sarraut
- Preceded by: Paul Jacquier
- Succeeded by: Paul Ramadier

Member of the Chamber of Deputies
- In office c. April 1928 – c. May 1936

Secretary-General of the French Communist Party (Note: Originally founded as the French Section of the Communist International (Section française de l'Internationale communiste, SFIC).)
- In office 1920–1922
- Preceded by: Position established
- Succeeded by: Pierre Semard

Secretary-General of the SFIO
- In office October 1918 – 1920
- Preceded by: Louis Dubreuilh
- Succeeded by: Paul Faure

Personal details
- Born: Foussemagne, Territoire de Belfort, France
- Died: 11 February 1946 (aged 56) Paris, France
- Party: Communist Party (1920–1923); SFIO (1905–1920; 1923–1936)
- Children: André

Ludovic-Oscar Frossard (French pronunciation: [lydɔvik ɔskaʁ fʁɔsaʁ]; 5 March 1889 – 11 February 1946), also known as L.-O. Frossard or Oscar Frossard, was a French socialist and communist politician. He was a founding member in 1905 and Secretary-General of the French Socialist Party (SFIO) from 1918 to 1920, as well as a founding member and Secretary-General of the French Communist Party (PCF) from 1920 to 1922.

On 1 January 1923 Frossard resigned his positions and left the Communist movement over political differences. Frossard briefly attempted to establish an independent Communist political organization before returning to the ranks of the SFIO, gaining election to parliament under that party's banner in 1928, 1932, and 1936.

From 1935 until 1940 Frossard held a series of ministerial positions in successive governments of Pierre Laval, Albert Sarraut, Camille Chautemps, Léon Blum, Édouard Daladier, Paul Reynaud, and the first government of Philippe Pétain. Following the armistice between France and Nazi Germany, Frossard declined to participate in the Vichy French government headed by Pétain, but continued to work as a journalist. His position led to his investigation, trial, and acquittal over accusations of collaborationism following the fall of the Pétain regime.

== Early years ==
He was born 5 March 1889 in Foussemagne, Territoire de Belfort, France. His father was a saddlemaker who was dedicated to his son's education and success in life.

Following completion of his schooling, Frossard became a schoolteacher, also working as a journalist. He also became involved in Socialist politics, joining the Section française de l'Internationale ouvrière (SFIO), at the time of its formation in 1905.

== Early political career ==
During World War I, Frossard supported the pacifist minority faction of the SFIO. As the bloody conflict ground on without remit, Frossard's antiwar perspective became the majority view in the SFIO, leading to his election as Secretary-General of the party in 1918. He would remain in that capacity until the SFIO split into socialist and communist wings at the December 1920 Congress at Tours.

In the summer of 1920 Frossard travelled to the Russian Soviet Federative Socialist Republic along with his party comrade, Marcel Cachin; the two participated in the 2nd World Congress of the Communist International.

Frossard was active upon his return to France in advocating for the affiliation of the SFIO to the Comintern, and he departed with the left wing at the Tours Congress to form the Communist Party of France (PCF); he was its Secretary-General. Frossard was twice re-elected as the head of the PhD and was endorsed both at its 2nd Congress at Marseille in December 1921 and its 3rd Congress at Paris in October 1922.

As the Comintern developed, Frossard came into disagreement with several of its policies, which brought him into conflict. He traveled again to Moscow in June 1922 to serve as a delegate to the 2nd Enlarged Plenum of the Executive Committee of the Communist International (ECCI), a journey that marked his second and final trip to Soviet Russia. Although he did not attend the 4th World Congress of the Comintern in November 1922, he was still elected a member of ECCI at that gathering, his last high position in the French Communist movement.

== Return to SFIO ==
Frossard's dissatisfaction with the Comintern remained, however, and on 1 January 1923, he wrote a letter resigning from the Communist Party. He initially attempted to form a dissident Communist group but ultimately failed in this task and returned to participation in the SFIO, now headed by Léon Blum.

Elected to the Chamber of Deputies, the lower chamber of the French Third Republic, platform with the 1928 and the 1932 Cartel des gauches.

== Later career ==
He quit the SFIO group after the 1936 elections. His departure did not prevent him from becoming Minister of Propaganda (and the first one ever in this capacity) in Blum's Second Popular Front Ministry (March–April 1938).

From 1935, Frossard had been a member of the governments of Pierre Laval and Albert Sarraut (as Labor Minister) as well as that of Camille Chautemps (as Minister of State of the Services of the Presidency of the council). Afterwards, he served as Minister of Public Works under Radical Édouard Daladier and again as Minister of Propaganda under conservative Paul Reynaud.

Frossard was made Minister of Public Works and Transmissions in the First Government of Philippe Pétain after the Battle of France and the beginning of Nazi Germany's occupation of France. After the signing of the armistice between France and Germany, Frossard declined to be part of any Vichy France executive, but he still worked as a journalist under the new regime. On 23 January 1941, Frossard was made a member of the National Council of Vichy France. Suspicion of collaboration with the enemy led to an enquiry into his activities at the end of World War II, but he was soon cleared.

== Death and legacy ==
Frossard died 11 February 1946 in Paris.

Frossard's son, André Frossard, was a journalist and writer who converted to Catholicism in 1935.

== Footnotes ==
Notes

Citations

Political offices
Preceded by Ministry established	Minister of Propaganda; 1938	Succeeded by Office left vacant
Preceded by Jean Giraudoux	Minister of Propaganda; 1940	Succeeded by Jean Prouvost
Party political offices
Preceded by New position	General Secretary of the French Communist Party; 1920–1922	Succeeded by Louis Sellier
