= Jeannette Vermeersch =

French politician (1910–2001)

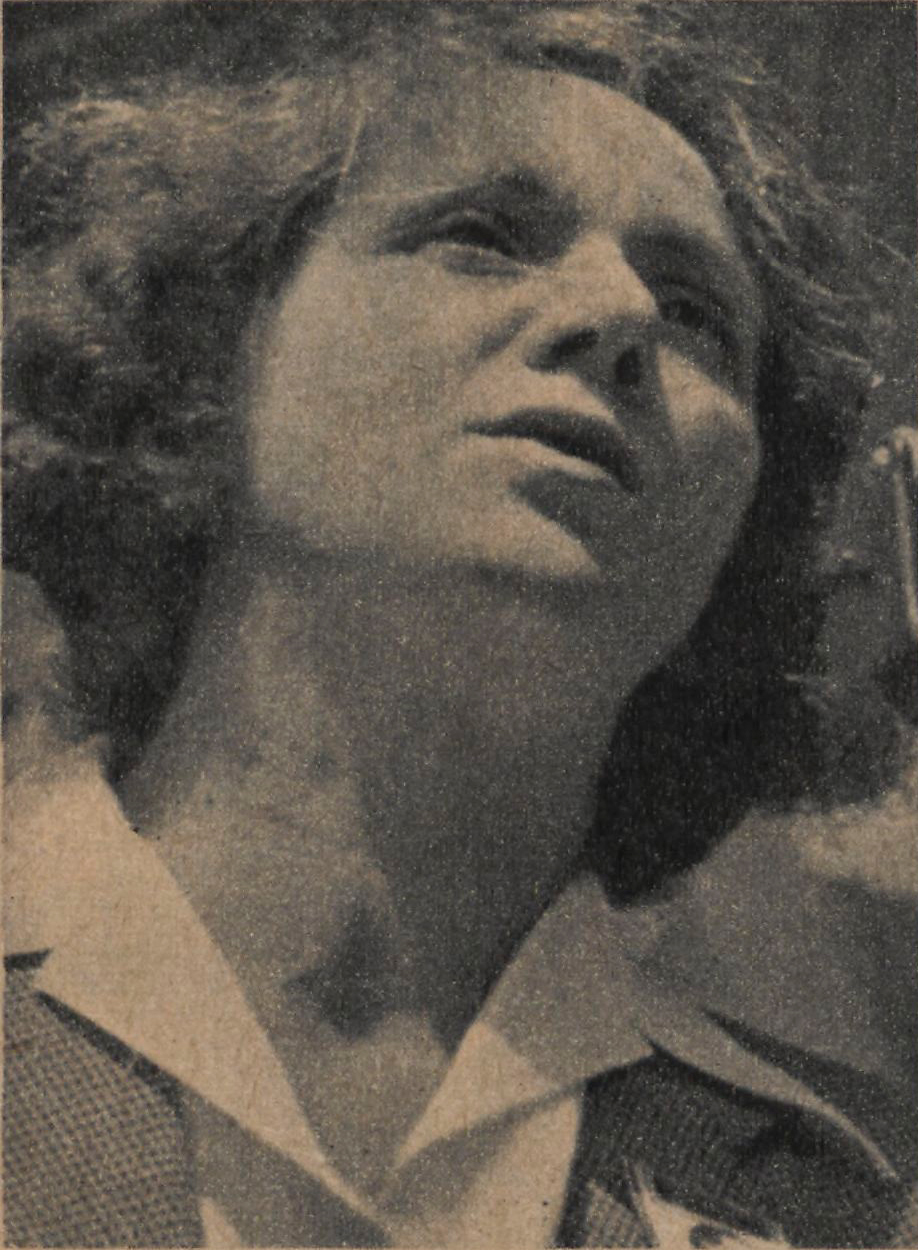
Jeannette Vermeersch

Jeannette Vermeersch (born Julie Marie Vermeersch; 26 November 1910 – 5 November 2001) was a French politician.

She is principally known for having been the companion (1932–1947) and then the wife (1947–1964) of Maurice Thorez, general secretary of the French Communist Party (PCF), with whom she had three children, born before their union was made official.

== Biography ==
Born in La Madeleine, Nord as the seventh of nine children in a family of workers, Jeannette Vermeersch joined the workforce at the age of ten, despite the fact that at the time, children under the age of 13 were legally prohibited from working. Her first job was as a servant at a wine merchant's, then in a bourgeois family, before she entered a textile factory as a worker in 1921, all the while continuing to do chores after her hours of work at the factory.

Vermeersch began activity as a union activist in 1927. Through connections she formed in the union, she came to discover communism, whose growth as a movement was then in full swing in France, several years after the Tours Congress, and she founded a section of Young Communists. Her communist activity led her, in 1929, to be designated to take part in a delegation of textile workers who travelled to explore the Soviet Union. While her comrades returned to France, Jeannette Vermeersch chose to prolong her stay, remaining in Moscow for several months and working "for the cause". It is on this occasion that she would have heard the name of Maurice Thorez spoken for the first time in her presence, a little while before meeting him at the 16th Congress of the Communist Party of the Soviet Union in 1930.

Their relationship only became intimate in 1932. During the following seven years, Jeannette Vermeersch focused on Party missions; as an agent, she was zealous but a little withdrawn. For example, under the guidance of Jacques Duclos, she organised an extraordinary congress of Communist Youth in 1933, retaking control of a movement suspected of drifting in an "avant-gardist" direction. She was also one of the pivotal members of a new organisation that the Party had asked to be formed, the Union of Young French Women. After the Spanish Civil War began in 1936, she also focused very clearly on getting together a network of people in solidarity with the Second Spanish Republic, in addition to her other responsibilities. She headed the operation that sent food and various materials to the Republicans and organised the welcome of political refugees on French soil by the Communist networks present in small French towns.

On 2 October 1939, shortly after World War II began, she accompanied Mounette Dutilleul, who had come to Chauny to bring Maurice Thorez orders to desert, issued by the Third International. Escorted by Alphonse Pelayo, they left together toward the Nord département, but crossed the Belgian border separately. Jeannette Vermeersch and her two young sons joined Maurice Thorez in Moscow. They remained in the USSR until November 1944. Jeannette gave birth to a third son in a clinic near Moscow.

In 1945, after her return to France, Jeannette Vermeersch was elected a deputy to the constituent assembly that met from 21 October 1945 to 5 May 1946, until the first proposal for a new French constitution was rejected by referendum. She was then elected, without interruption, to every sitting of the National Assembly until 1958, then moving up to the Senate, where she sat until 1968.

On 17 September 1947, Maurice Thorez and Jeannette Vermeersch made their union official at the city hall of Choisy-le-Roi (today in Val-de-Marne département). In 1950, when Maurice Thorez was stricken with hemiplegia and left to seek treatment in the USSR, Jeannette Vermeersch entered the Politburo of the French Communist Party, of which she was a member until 1968.

In 1956, Jeannette Vermeersch, speaking as vice president of the Union of French Women, took a stance against birth control: "Birth control, voluntary motherhood, is a bait for the great masses, but it is a weapon in the hands of the bourgeoisie against social laws". This position went against that of numerous activists, notably in the medical field. Thorez took Jeannette's side in condemning neo-Malthusian conjectures.

After Thorez died in 1964, she was often very critical of the new direction taken by general secretary Waldeck Rochet, and decided to resign from the Politburo in 1968 after Rochet expressed disapproval for the intervention of Warsaw Pact troops in Czechoslovakia to put an end to the Prague Spring. On the same occasion she ended her political career, nevertheless remaining an activist of the base, renewing her Communist Party membership until her death.

After her death and cremation, her ashes were transferred to Paris, to the Père Lachaise Cemetery, into the tomb of Maurice Thorez.

On the occasion of her death, the heads of the party, Robert Hue (party president) and Marie-George Buffet (national secretary and Minister of Youth Affairs and Sports) underlined that, although they disagreed with the deceased on a number of points, they still saluted the unflappability of her convictions and the permanence of her involvement.

After 1950, Jeannette Vermeersch also used the name Jeannette Thorez-Vermeersch, but she is usually known by her historical pseudonym, notably within the Communist Party. She never used the name Jeannette Thorez.

She died in Callian, Var.

== Union and party functions ==
- 1930–1931: member of the secretariat of Young Communists of the Nord
- 1931–1932: member of the national committee of young union members of the Unitary General Confederation of Labour
- 1932–1934: member of the national bureau of Young Communists
- 1934–1935: co-director of the Union of Young French Women
- 1945–1974: vice president of the Union of French Women
- 1950–1968: member of the Politburo of the French Communist Party

== Elected political positions ==
- 1945–1946: deputy for Seine (first constituent assembly)
- 1946–1947: deputy for Seine (second constituent assembly)
- 1947–1951: deputy for Seine
- 1951–1956: deputy for Seine
- 1956–1958: deputy for Seine
- 1959–1964: senator for Seine
- 1964–1968: senator for Val-de-Marne

== Works ==
- Jeannette Thorez-Vermeersch, Vers quels lendemains ? : de l'internationalisme à l'eurocommunisme (Toward What Futures? From Internationalism to Eurocommunism), Hachette, « Hachette-Essais » collection, Paris, 1979. 204 p. ISBN 2-01-006694-4.
- Jeannette Thorez-Vermeersch, la Vie en rouge : mémoires (My Life in Red: Memoirs), Belfond, Paris, February 1998. 242 p. ISBN 2-7144-3515-7.
