= Florimond Bonte =

French politician

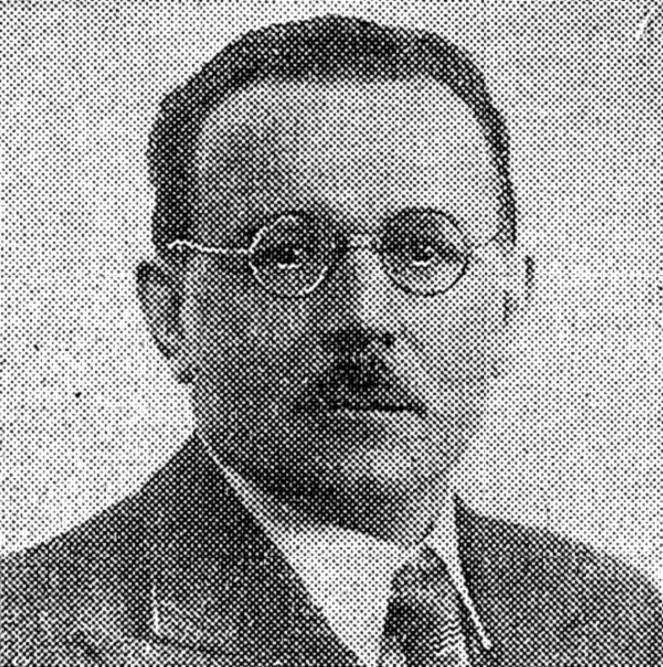
- Born: 22 January 1890; Tourcoing, France
- Died: 19 November 1977 (aged 87); Fleury-Mérogis, Paris, France
- Occupations: Newspaper editor, journalist, politician
- Political party: French Communist Party

Florimond Bonte (22 January 1890 – 19 November 1977) was a French communist politician and journalist.

== Biography ==
Florimond Bonte was born in to modest Catholic family. While working as a teacher, he was active in his youth within the Christian-democratic movement Le Sillon led by Marc Sangnier. In 1914, as an opponent of socialism, he debated the socialist leader Jules Guesde, who had a great influence on him.

During the First World War, he was wounded in September 1914 at the Battle of the Marne. Taken prisoner in 1916, he read Das Kapital and other Marxist works while he was in contact with Russian prisoners, which led to his conversion to socialism. He took part in 1918 in the German Revolution as a participant in certain deliberations of the Workers' and Soldiers' Council in the Giessen region. After returning to France, he participated in the creation of the Northern Federation of the Republican Association of Veterans (ARAC), chaired by Henri Barbusse. A member of the Northern Federation of the French Section of the Workers' International, he participated, after the Tours Congress in 1920 and became a founding member of the French Communist Party. He became secretary of the PCF Federation of the North, then in 1924, he was appointed with Maurice Thorez as secretary of the communist region of the North and Pas-de-Calais. From 1929 to 1934, Bonte served as editor-in-chief of L'Humanité. In the 1936 legislative elections, he was elected deputy in the 2nd constituency of the 11th arrondissement of Paris. He joined the Universal Suffrage Commission and the Foreign Affairs Commission. He spoke in favour of collective security and general disarmament, and denounced the consequences of the Munich Agreement.

As co-signatory with Arthur Ramette of a letter written on behalf of the French Workers' and Peasants' Group, he requested the Chamber examine peace offers from the USSR. Bonte was arrested by the police, imprisoned, stripped of his mandate and then sentenced on April 3, 1940 by a military tribunal of Paris to 5 years in prison, a 5,000 franc fine and 5 years of deprivation of his civil and political rights.

Imprisoned in several prisons in France, and then transferred with 26 of his colleagues to the Maison-Carrée penitentiary in Algeria, where he was later released after the Allied landings in North Africa in 1943. In November of the same year, he was appointed by the French Committee of National Liberation as a delegate to the Provisional Consultative Assembly, where he was one of the representatives of the communist group in the Chamber of Deputies.

In 1945, he was elected to the 1st National Constituent Assembly, in the 3rd constituency of the Seine, then re-elected in 1946 to the 2nd National Constituent Assembly. He sat again in the National Assembly in November 1946, and was re-elected in 1951 and 1956. He returned to the Foreign Affairs Committee.
