= Georges Marchais =

French politician (1920–1997)

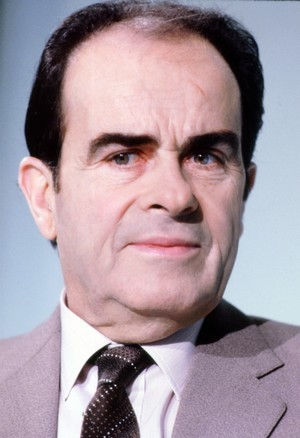
- Georges Marchais in 1981

General Secretary of the French Communist Party
- In office 17 December 1972 – 29 January 1994
- Preceded by: Waldeck Rochet
- Succeeded by: Robert Hue

Personal details
- Born: 7 June 1920 La Hoguette, Calvados, France
- Died: 16 November 1997 (aged 77) Paris, France
- Party: French Communist Party
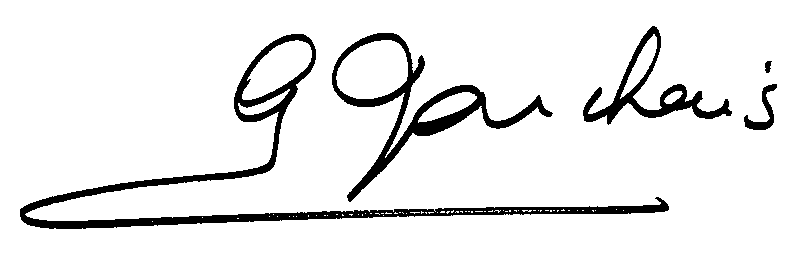
- Signature

Georges René Louis Marchais (French pronunciation: [ʒɔʁʒ(ə) ʁəne lwi maʁʃɛ]; 7 June 1920 – 16 November 1997) was the head of the French Communist Party (PCF) from 1972 to 1994, and a candidate in the 1981 French presidential election.

== Early life ==
Born on 7 June 1920 in La Hoguette into a Roman Catholic family, he became a mechanic, just before the beginning of World War II, with the Société Nationale d'Étude et de Construction de Moteurs d'Aviation. After the fall of France, he went to Nazi Germany to work in the Messerschmitt aircraft manufacturing plant. He returned to France in May 1943 with forged documents.

In 1946, he became secretary of the metalworkers' trade union in Issy-les-Moulineaux, and advanced in the Confédération générale du travail in his commune from 1951, becoming secretary of the Seine Metallurgical Workers' Union Federation from 1953 to 1956.

== Political career ==
Marchais joined the French Communist Party in 1947. In 1956, he was appointed a member of the extended Central Committee and led the South-Seine PCF local federation, in the bastion of Maurice Thorez, the historical leader of the Party. Three years later, he became a full member of the Central Committee and of the Politburo. His lightning promotion was explained by his professional origins and his devotion to Thorez. Indeed, he was part of the young guard of the General Secretary which participated to the strengthening of Maurice Thorez's leadership, which was covertly disputed by some members of the Politburo (Laurent Casanova and Marcel Servin). In 1961, after the ousting of these, he was nominated secretary for organization. Then, he supported the new General Secretary Waldeck Rochet and in his policy of conciliation with the other left-wing parties. In reaction to the events of May 68, in a controversial article published in the party's newspaper L'Humanité, Marchais condemned student protest leader Daniel Cohn-Bendit as a "German anarchist" and accused some students of being bourgeois "false revolutionaries". From then on, he was one of the personalities intervening in the media in the name of the PCF.

When Rochet fell ill, in 1970, he was promoted junior General Secretary. In fact, he was at this moment the real leader of the PCF. In this, he co-signed the Programme commun joint platform with the Socialist Party (PS) and the Movement of Left Radicals (MRG) in June 1972. From 1973 to 1997, he served as a deputy representing the Val-de-Marne department.

In December 1972, he became officially General Secretary, following Waldeck Rochet's retirement. At first, he pursued the policy of his predecessor in favour of the "Union of the Left". In this, the PCF sided with François Mitterrand's (PS) candidacy in the 1974 presidential election. At the beginning of his mandate of General Secretary, the PCF scored around 20% in the elections. But in mid-1970s, it lost its place of "first left-wing party" to François Mitterrand's Socialist Party. At the beginning, he supported reforms in the PCF, which formed part of the trend of Eurocommunism along with the Italian Communist Party of Enrico Berlinguer and the Spanish Communist Party of Santiago Carrillo, and renounced the notion of a dictatorship of the proletariat at the party's 22nd congress in 1976. Faced with the reproaches of Soviet leaders and the growth of the PS at the expense of his party, he imposed a re-alignment with the Soviet Union at the end of the 1970s. The left-wing parties failed to update the Programme commun and lost the 1978 legislative election, even though they were leading in the polls. Outside and inside the party, he was accused of being responsible for this defeat. The next year, he supported the Soviet invasion of Afghanistan, judged the governments of the Eastern Bloc as "fairly positive", and criticized the "right-wing drift" of the Socialist Party. In the 1981 presidential election, he came fourth in the first round, with 15% of votes; he endorsed Mitterrand in the second round. After Mitterrand's victory, he negotiated the entry of four PCF politicians into the cabinet of Socialist Prime Minister Pierre Mauroy.

In 1984, after Mitterrand renounced the Programme commun and the PCF won only 11% of votes in the European Parliament election, the PCF's ministers resigned from the cabinet. An electoral decline ensued and Marchais faced internal dissent from figures such as Pierre Juquin, Claude Poperen and former ministers as Charles Fiterman. Indeed, some party members, notably among the locally elected, accused him of leading a suicidal strategy. He accused them of plotting with Mitterrand in order to dissolve the PCF in Social Democracy. He let André Lajoinie, leader of the Communist group in the National Assembly, represent the party in the 1988 presidential election. He was reserved about perestroika. Unlike the Italian Communists, he refused to change the name of the French party after the collapse of the Soviet bloc.

In 1994, at the 28th Congress of the PCF, he ceded his place as General Secretary to Robert Hue, although he maintained his titular role as a member of the Politburo, which was now significantly renamed the National Office. The same year, he became President of the PCF Comité pour la défense des libertés et droits de l'homme en France et dans le monde ("Committee for the defense of human liberties and rights in France and throughout the world"). He criticized the renovation of the party under his successor. He died in 1997.

== Attitudes ==
Georges Marchais was a notable personality because of his mannerisms (Çt'un scandaaaale — "This is a scandal!") and brusque demeanor, often lambasted by comic Thierry Le Luron. He is particularly remembered for an outburst to journalist Jean-Pierre Elkabbach, Taisez-vous Elkabbach ("Shut up, Elkabbach!"), which was not actually ever said by Marchais (it was said by Pierre Douglas while imitating Marchais to Thierry Le Luron, who was himself imitating Raymond Barre).

During his TV performances, which stayed in the memory of French audiences, his tone with journalists and opponents was aggressive and humorous. For instance, questioned by Elkabbach and Alain Duhamel about his economic propositions, he answered: "you are privileged, you hold many jobs and make good salaries (in TV, radio, papers...), probably you are concerned by my proposition for a wealth tax, I understand why you don't want the change!"

== Works ==
- Les Communistes et les Paysans – "The Communists and Peasantry" (1972)
- Le défi démocratique – "The Challenge of Democracy" (1973)
- La politique du PCF – "PCF Policies" (1974)
- Communistes et/ou chrétiens – "Communists and/or Christians" (1977)
- Parlons franchement – "Let's Be Frank" (1977)
- Réponses – "Answers" (1977)
- L'espoir au présent – "Hope in the Present" (1980)
- Démocratie – "Democracy" (1990)

== Bibliography ==
- Brown, Bernard (1974). Protest in Paris: Anatomy of a Revolt. Morristown, NJ: General Learning Press.
- Brown, Bernard (1982). Socialism of a Different Kind: Reshaping the Left in France. New York: Greenwood Press.
- Lane, A Thomas (1995). Biographical Dictionary of European Labor Leaders. Two volumes. Westport: Greenwood Press.
- Penniman, Howard (1988). France at the Polls, 1981 and 1986. Durham: Duke University Press.
- Wilsford, David (1995). Political Leaders of Contemporary Western Europe. Westport: Greenwood Press. pp 301–6.

Party political offices
Preceded by Waldeck Rochet	General Secretary of the French Communist Party; 1972–1994	Succeeded by Robert Hue
