= Foussemagne =

- Commune
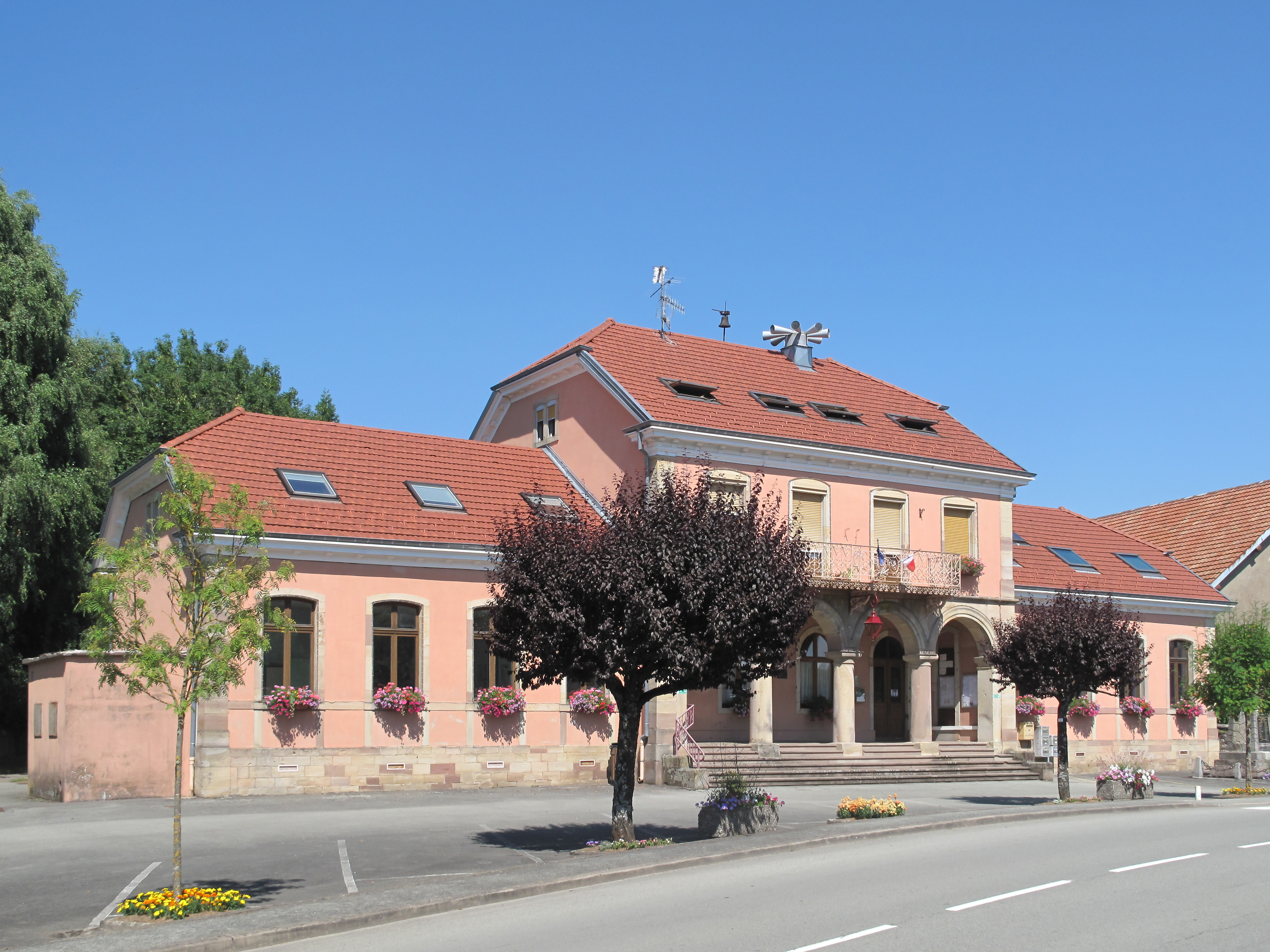
- Foussemagne, town hall

- Coat of arms
- Location of Foussemagne
- Location within France Location within Bourgogne-Franche-Comté
- Coordinates: 47°38′06″N 7°00′24″E
- Country: France
- Region: Bourgogne-Franche-Comté
- Department: Territoire de Belfort
- Arrondissement: Belfort
- Canton: Grandvillars
- Intercommunality: Grand Belfort

Government
  - Mayor (2020–2026): Arnaud Miotte
- Area^{1}: 5.10 km^{2} (1.97 sq mi)
- Highest elevation: 376 m (1,234 ft)
- Lowest elevation: 338 m (1,109 ft)
- Population (2023): 869
  - Density: 170/km^{2} (441/sq mi)
- Time zone: UTC+01:00 (CET)
  - Summer (DST): UTC+02:00 (CEST)
- INSEE/Postal code: 90049 /90150
- ^{1} French Land Register data, which excludes lakes, ponds, glaciers > 1 km^{2} (0.386 sq mi or 247 acres) and river estuaries.

Foussemagne (French pronunciation: [fusmaɲ]) is a commune in the Territoire de Belfort department in Bourgogne-Franche-Comté in northeastern France.

== See also ==
- Communes of the Territoire de Belfort department
