= Waldeck Rochet =

French politician

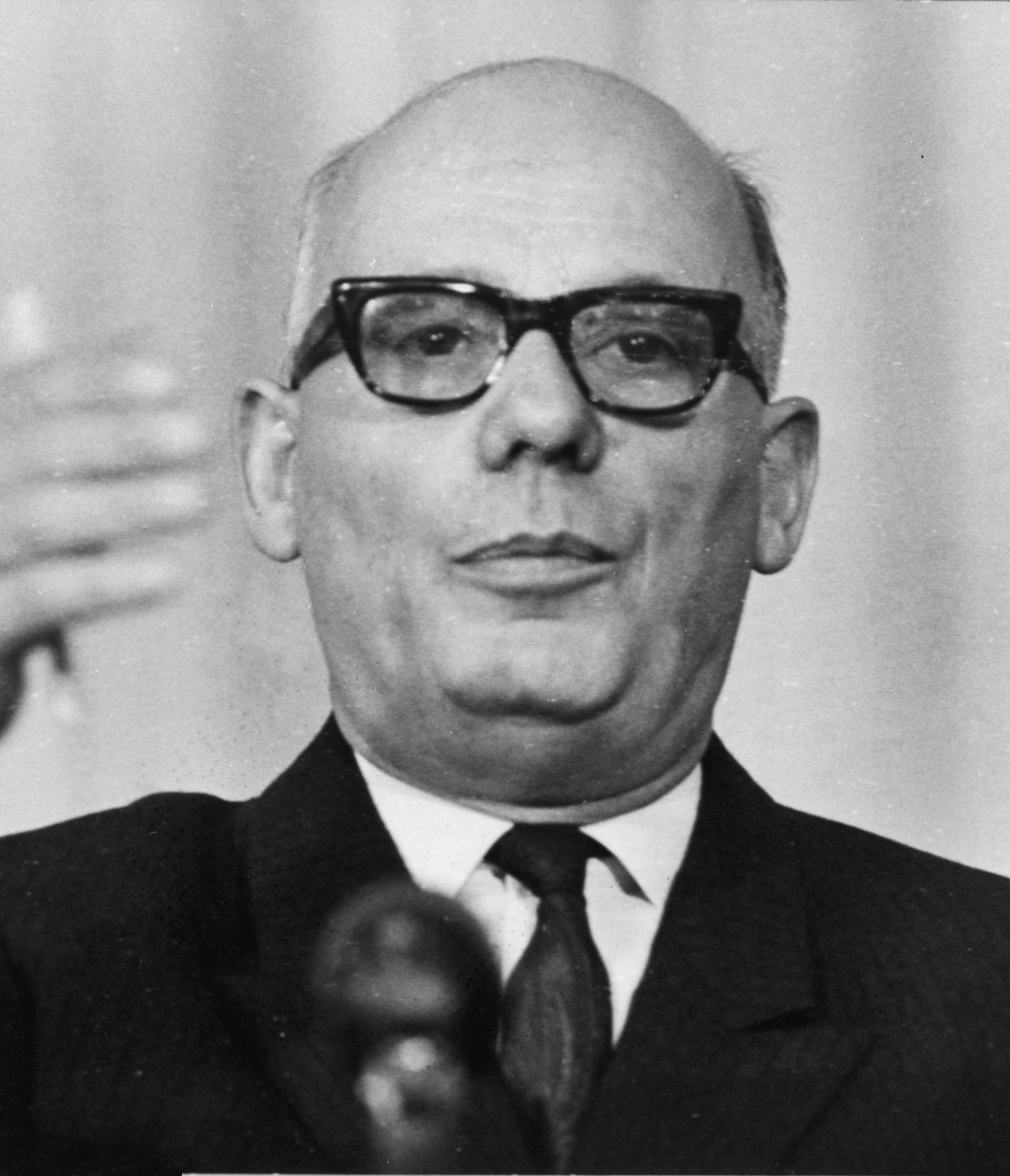
- Waldeck Rochet in 1968

Deputy of the National Assembly
- In office October 21, 1945 – April 1, 1973
- In office May 3, 1936 – January 21, 1940

General Secretary of the Communist Party of France
- In office May 17, 1964 – December 17, 1972
- Preceded by: Maurice Thorez
- Succeeded by: Georges Marchais

Personal details
- Born: April 5, 1905 Sainte-Croix, France
- Died: February 17, 1983 (aged 77) Nanterre, Paris, France
- Resting place: Père Lachaise Cemetery, Paris
- Party: Communist Party of France (1923–)

Military service
- Allegiance: Free France; France
- Branch/service: Free French Forces; French Army
- Years of service: 1943–1945 (Free France); 1926–1927 (France)
- Battles/wars: World War Two; French Resistance

Waldeck Rochet (French: [waldɛk ʁɔʃɛ]; 5 April 1905 – 17 February 1983) was a French communist politician. He was General Secretary of the French Communist Party (PCF) from 1964 to 1972.

== Early life and career ==
The son of a cobbler, Rochet was named in honor of politician Pierre Waldeck-Rousseau. After completing his service in the army, he worked in market gardening. In 1923, he joined the youth wing of the French Communist Party (PCF), and the following year the Party itself. He was sent over to the Soviet Union, in order to receive political training at Moscow's International Lenin School. Rochet was local Party secretary in Lyon, then joined the central leadership in Paris; from 1936 to 1940, he was a communist representative in the lower chamber (the Third Republic equivalent of today's French National Assembly), elected in Colombes-Nanterre. During those years, Waldeck Rochet founded and edited the periodical La Terre.

Charged by Party leader Maurice Thorez with agricultural matters and reporting to the Politburo, he took steps to ensure that divisions between peasants and urban dwellers were not to be encouraged within the Party structure. In 1939, he refused to condemn the Molotov–Ribbentrop Pact (as did the entire Party leadership), placing himself outside French law. He was detained in the French colony of Algeria, passing into the custody of Vichy France after the German invasion of France (1940), being set free by the Allies on the wake of the North African Campaign.

In 1943, after joining the Free French Forces, he represented the communists in London and was elected to the provisional legislative body in Algiers. In late 1944, after the Liberation of Paris, Waldeck Rochet regained the French capital, where he carried on as representative.

== After World War II ==
In 1945, he became a member of the Politburo, and was elected deputy for Saône-et-Loire in the two successive Constituent Assemblies; in 1946, he was a representative to the National Assembly – serving until 1958, the first year of the French Fifth Republic. From that moment on, Rochet was elected in other constituencies: Seine, then Seine-Saint-Denis (for Aubervilliers), until 1973. He was head of the Assembly's agriculture commission, as well as president of the communist parliamentary group.

During those years, Rochet rose to the third most important position within the Party, after Thorez and Jacques Duclos. A deputy general secretary in 1961, he became the PCF leader in 1964. Favorable to left-wing cooperation, Rochet directed the PCF votes towards François Mitterrand in the presidential elections of 1965. The problem he faced as general secretary was the balance between a needed rejuvenation of the PCF structure and maintaining an orthodox Marxist-Leninist ideology. In consequence, he publicly stated his disregard for the leftist movement of May 1968, while later in the same year he had to deal with the Soviet crushing of the Prague Spring (when he tended to be favorable to the latter). The considerable stress of dealing with the latter event took a great toll on Rochet's nervous health.

In 1970, as Rochet had become too ill to attend to his duties, Georges Marchais became the de facto Party leader, while Rochet remained National Secretary until 1972, then honorary president until 1979. During the last portion of his life, Waldeck Rochet turned towards Roman Catholicism, publicly displaying devotion for The Virgin, an attitude which led several of his comrades to consider that he had become insane. He died in Paris.

Party political offices
Preceded by Maurice Thorez	Secretary General of the French Communist Party; 1964–1972	Succeeded by Georges Marchais
