= Amélie Trayaud =

French politician

Mayor of Joinville-le-Pont
- In office March 1953 – May 1953
- Preceded by: Robert Deloche
- Succeeded by: Georges Defert

Municipal Councillor for Joinville-le-Pont
- In office 1945–1959

Personal details
- Born: Amélie Eugénie Duteyrat; 11 March 1883 Mansat-la-Courrière, France
- Died: 19 September 1963 (aged 80) Joinville-le-Pont, France
- Party: Union des femmes françaises; Communist Party
- Spouse: Louis Trayaud (m. 1908; died 1930)

Amélie Trayaud (11 March 1883 – 19 September 1963) was a French politician. She served in the French Resistance during World War II.

She was born Amélie Eugénie Duteyrat in Mansat-la-Courrière. She worked for the Société des transports en commun de la région parisienne. At the end of World War II, Trayaud was a member of the local liberation committee ("Comité local de Libération") under the National Front.

In 1945, she was elected a municipal councillor for Joinville-le-Pont, running as a member of the Union des femmes françaises. She was reelected in 1947 as a communist. After Robert Deloche was forced to resign as mayor, she served as mayor of Joinville-le-Pont from March to May 1953. Following the municipal election in May 1953, she served as municipal councillor until 1959.

In 1908, she married Louis Trayaud; he died in 1930.

She died in Joinville-le-Pont at the age of 80.
