= Solange Troisier =

French physician and feminist

- Born: 19 July 1919; Paris, France
- Died: 9 September 2008 (aged 89); Saint-Hymer, Calvados. France
- Occupation: Physician
- Known for: Inspector General of Prisons

Solange Troisier (19 July 1919 – 9 September 2008) was a French physician, Inspector General of Prisons, and deputy for the Val-d'Oise. She was a left-wing Gaullist, a feminist, and was active in many committees on social issues.

== Early life and education ==
Solange Louise Troisier was born in the 16th arrondissement of Paris on 19 July 1919. Her father was Jean Troisier (1881–1945), professor of pulmonary tuberculosis at Laennec Hospital, a member of the National Academy of Medicine and laboratory director at the Pasteur Institute. Her grandfather was Charles Émile Troisier (1844–1919), another eminent doctor. Her mother was born Geneviève Emile-Ollivier. On her mother's side she was granddaughter of Émile Ollivier (1825–1913), the last minister of Napoleon III during the more liberal final phase of the Second French Empire. He was the son of Démosthène Ollivier (1799–1884), a socialist in the July Monarchy and the French Second Republic who was imprisoned several times for his views.

Troisier studied at the Lycée Victor Hugo, Paris and the Faculty of Medicine of the University of Paris. She earned the certificat d'études physiques, chimiques et biologiques (PCB) and undertook her medical studies during World War II (1939–45). After the German occupation she joined the Eleuthère network of the French Resistance. In January 1945 she became a doctor-lieutenant in General Jean de Lattre de Tassigny's office of the French First Army.

She was then engaged as a doctor for the irregular Colonne Fabien led by Pierre Georges ("Fabien"), which was attached to the regular army. She participated in the campaign in France and Germany and performed her first amputation on the battlefield. She received the Croix de Guerre from General François de Linares (1897–1955), but refused the Legion of Honour because so many who deserved it more had died.

== Career ==
Troisier became an intern in 1948, then an assistant in 1955 in the Hôpitaux de Paris. She was clinical director at the Faculty of Medicine of Paris from 1952, and in 1955 became a gynecological surgeon in Paris. She served as an expert to the tribunals of the Court of Cassation. Troisier set up in private practice where she specialised in obstetrics and the care of newborns, and became involved in social aspects of medicine. She travelled widely, usually with Princess Marie Bonaparte (1882–1962), great-grand-niece of the emperor Napoleon and an advocate of Freudian psychoanalysis.

In 1962 Troisier began a career as a prison doctor, and set up a gynecological consultation at La Petite Roquette.

Troisier was a great admirer of General Charles de Gaulle, who had given women the vote, and adhered to the left wing of Gaullism. From 1968 to 1973 Troisier was deputy for Sarcelles in the Val-d'Oise department as a member of the Union of Democrats for the Republic. She was vice-president of the Committee on Cultural, Family and Social Affairs (1968–69). In the National Assembly she supported the education reforms of Edgar Faure, social spending, parental rights, equal pay for men and women, the fight against drugs and alcohol, reform of the 1920 Abortion Act and abolition of the monopoly of undertakers.

As a doctor treating women prisoners, Troisier became aware of the appalling conditions in which they were incarcerated, and began a crusade for prison reform. This led to her being appointed Medical Inspector General of the Prison Service in 1973. She was made a knight of the Legion of Honor in 1974.

Troisier set up psychological medical centers in each region and placed a psychiatrist in each prison. She was Medical Inspector General of Prisons until 1983. That year she was the star witness in a trial that revealed a profitable traffic in pardons for common criminals. She was relieved of her position but proved her innocence. She eventually became as Grand Officer of the Legion of Honor.

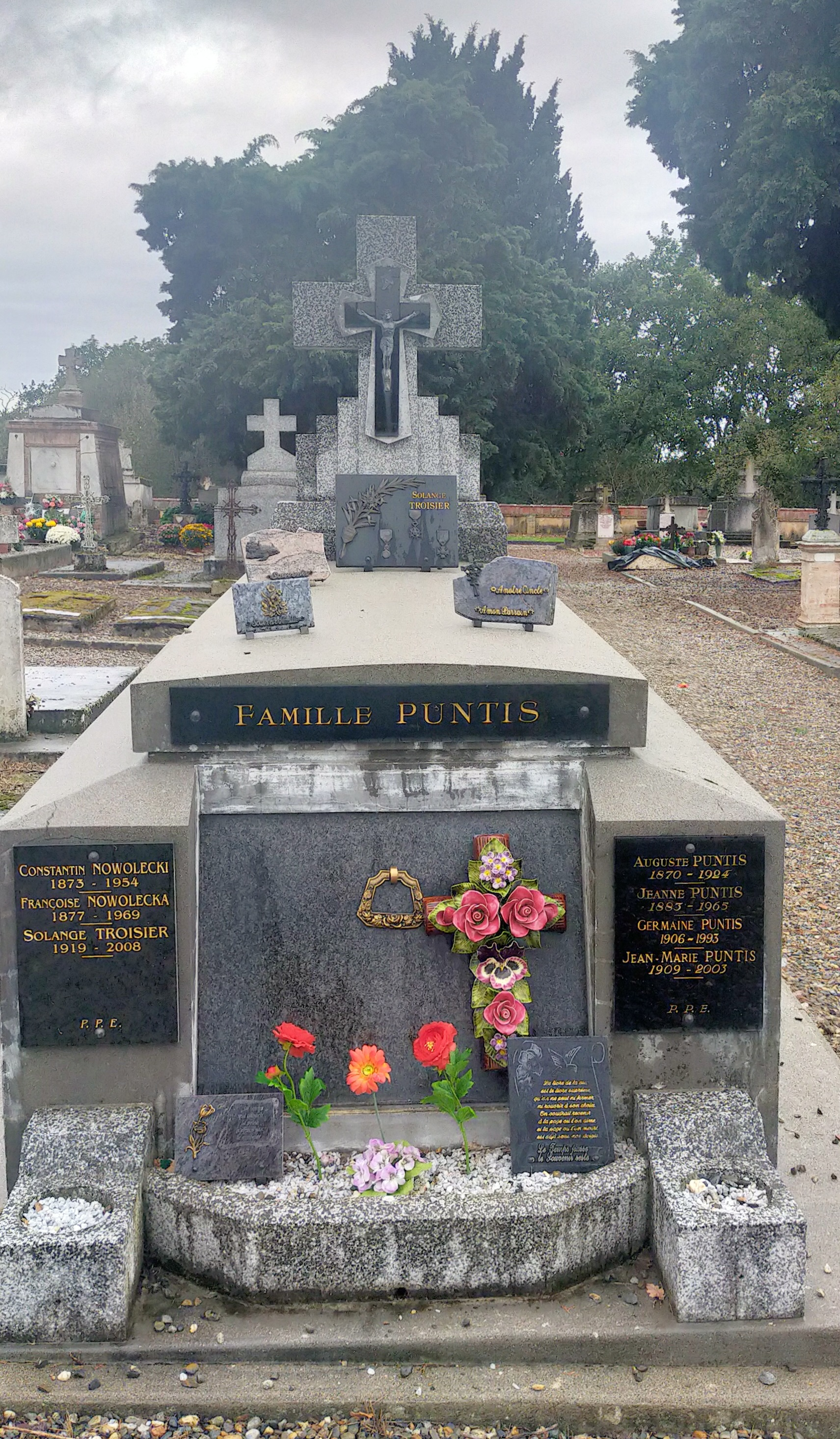
Solange Troisier's grave in Savenès (Tarn-et-Garonne).

Solange Troisier died in Saint-Hymer, Calvados on 9 September 2008, aged 89.

== Committees ==
Solange Troisier served on numerous committees and organisations. She was:

- Member of the Committee of study and information on alcoholism (1969–83)
- Honorary Professor of Forensic Medicine and Prison Medicine at Lariboisière Hospital (1977–86)
- President of the National Association of Midwives (1970–83)
- President of the National Council of French Women (CNFF: Conseil national des femmes françaises) (1976–91).
- Member of the Supreme Council of Sexual Information, Birth Control and Family Education (from 1974)
- Member of the national council of the Rally for the Republic (RPR: Rassemblement pour la République)
- President (1977–96) and honorary president of the International Council of Prison Medical Services
- Member of the Economic and Social Council
- Member of the National Consultative Ethics Committee for Life Sciences and Health (1996–2000)
- Member of the National Council of the Rhine and Danube [Conseil national de Rhin et Danube) (from 1982)

== Publications ==
- Solange Troisier (1985). J'étais médecin des prisons. L'affaire des grâces médicales (in French). La Table Ronde. ISBN 2710302586.
- Solange Troisier (2003). Une sacrée bonne femme (in French). Preface by Jean Bernard, postface by Jacques Chirac. Éditions Gallimard. ISBN 2710325446.

== Sources ==
- Demonpion, Denis (1996-10-19). "Le retour de Solange Troisier". Le Point.
- Guéraiche, William (1999-01-01). Les femmes et la République: essai sur la répartition du pouvoir de 1943 à 1979. Editions de l'Atelier. ISBN 978-2-7082-3468-0.
- "Historique" (in French). CNFF.
- "Solange Troissier (1919-2008)" (in French). AAIHP.
- "Solange Troisier (1919-2008)". BnF.
- "Solange Troisier". Who's Who in France (in French).
- "Une sacrée bonne femme" (in French). Éditions Gallimard.
