= Charles Émile Troisier =

French surgeon

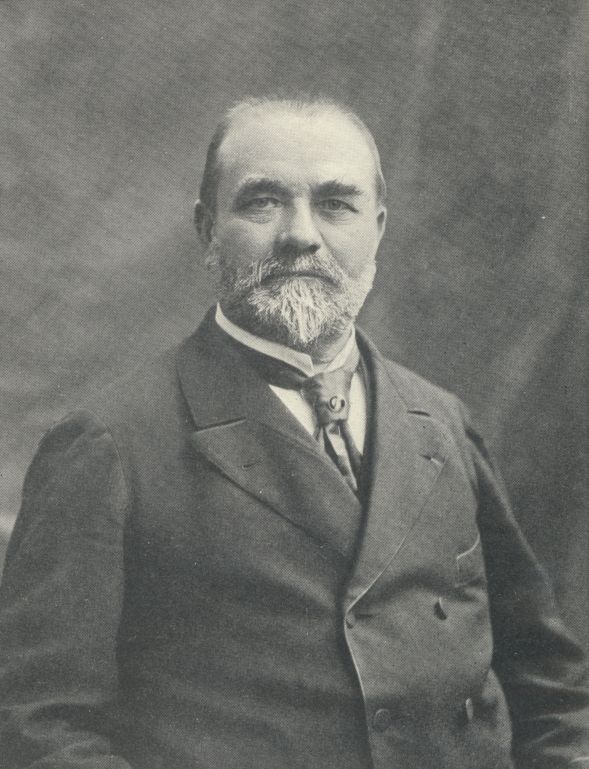
- Born: 6 April 1844; Sévigny-Waleppe, Ardennes, France
- Died: 11 December 1919 (aged 75); Paris, France
- Occupation: Surgeon

Charles Émile Troisier (6 April 1844 – 11 December 1919) was a French surgeon.

== Life ==
Charles Émile Troisier was born on 6 April 1844 in Sévigny-Waleppe, Ardennes. His mother was Marie-Louise Adeline Marache and his father Antoine Édouard Troisier, a health officer at Sévigny. He became a doctor of medicine in Paris in 1874, then a professor at the Faculty of Medicine of the University of Paris and a member of the Académie Nationale de Médecine.

He was made a knight of the Legion of Honour on 6 January 1890.

He had a close relationship with Princess Marie Bonaparte. His son, Jean Troisier (1881–1945), also became a doctor and biologist, and was head of the laboratory at the Pasteur Institute. His granddaughter, Solange Troisier (1919–2008) was a doctor and a leading feminist.

== Works ==
- Joseph Marie Jules Parrot (1886). Charles Emile Troisier (ed.). La Syphilis Hereditaire Et Le Rachitis (in French).

== Legacy ==
The following are named for him:

- Troisier's sign, a hard, enlarged, left supraclavicular lymph node
- Troisier-Hanot-Chauffard syndrome, a form of diabetes mellitus

== Sources ==
- "Anomalies du métabolisme du fer". Taurus. Université de Neuchâtel. Archived from the original on 2014-12-27.
- "Charles Emile Troisier". Whonamedit? A dictionary of medical eponyms. Archived from the original on August 15, 2002.
- "Jean Troisier (1881-1945)". Institut Pasteur. Archived from the original on 2015-09-24.
- "LH/2632/24 TROISIER Charles Emile". Leonore. Ministry of Culture.
- Moreau-Ricaud, Michelle (2011). "Eugénie Sokolnicka et Marie Bonaparte". Topique. 115 (2). L'esprit du Temps: 83. doi:10.3917/top.115.0083. ISBN 9782847952056.
- "Solange Troissier (1919-2008)" (in French). AAIHP.
