= Roger Belbéoch =

- Roger Belbéoch, third from left, with his colleagues at the Nogent police commissariat, 8 May 1945
- Born: 26 July 1921; Saint-Maurice, Val-de-Marne, France
- Died: 5 November 2010 (aged 89); Joinville-le-Pont, France
- Occupation: Policeman
- Known for: Righteous Among the Nations

Roger Belbéoch (26 July 1921 – 5 November 2010) was a French communist militant, member of the French Resistance during World War II (1939–45), a policeman and deputy mayor of Joinville-le-Pont. He was known for the assistance that he gave to Jews during the war, providing false papers so they could escape the Nazis and their collaborators. For this he was named Righteous Among the Nations by Yad Vashem.

== Early years ==
Roger Belbéoch was born on 26 July 1921 in Saint-Maurice, now in the Val-de-Marne. His family was from Brittany. His father was a Communist and taught him to resist all forms of oppression. After graduating from school he obtain a job with the PTT in 1938. He met and befriended the Communist propagandist Robert Deloche at the end of the 1930s.

== World War II (1939–45) ==
After the fall of France in June 1940 Belbéoch fell back on Clermont-Ferrand, then Lyon, with his comrades. They wanted to join General Charles de Gaulle, and wandered in Sète, Toulouse and Bordeaux in an effort to cross the border into Spain, but eventually returned to Paris. In 1941 he joined the Front-National pour la Liberté et l'Indépendance nationale. Albert Ouzoulias and Robert Deloche advised Belbéoch to infiltrate the Parisian police. Belbéoch joined the commissariat of the 12th arrondissement of Paris, in which position he could help members of the Resistance to gain false papers, and could help persecuted Jews. He was assigned to the Bel Air quarter. He made contact with the caretakers and office boys who worked for the Organisation Todt, and through them gained access to records of Jews who were subject to house arrest. His friends told him not to concern himself with the Jews, but he felt it was his duty. He also distributed Resistance leaflets and collected information.

On 16 July 1942, the day of the Vel' d'Hiv Roundup, French police arrested Belbéoch's Jewish fiancée Claudine Kaufmann and her family. He never saw her again. Madame Hermoza, Jewish wife of Joseph Mezan, a French Christian, was arrested because she was not wearing her star and taken to Belbéoch's police station, where Belbéoch at once set her free so she would not be delivered to the Gestapo. Her husband was arrested on the grounds that he was hiding a Jew, and was taken to the prefecture, where Belbéoch managed to get him released. Madame Hermoza escaped to the south with her two children using false papers supplied by Belbéoch. A colleague denounced Belbéoch.

On 6 September 1942 Belbéoch was arrested and taken to the Commissariat for Jewish Affairs. He expected to be accused of making false papers, but was confronted with a young Jewish member of the resistance whom he had given false papers and who had been terribly beaten. He began to insult the police and was himself beaten up. His tailbone and two ribs were broken. The prefect of Blois intervened. Belbéoch was taken to hospital in Saint Antoine, then to Brittany for two months to recover. On returning to Paris he demanded to resume his job. He was reinstated in the police and assigned to Nogent-sur-Marne. He continued to work for the Resistance and to help Jewish or Christian refugees until the liberation of France.

== Later career ==
After the war Belbéoch remained with the police, and became a Commandant of the National Police. He retired in 1975. He became a member of the board of the National Museum of the Resistance and adviser to the National Association of veterans of the Resistance. Belbéoch was deputy mayor of Joinville-le-Pont in the left-wing administration headed by Guy Gibout (1977–83). Belbéoch was given several awards for his Resistance work. On 19 December 1985 the Yad Vashem museum-memorial in Jerusalem awarded him the title of "Righteous Among the Nations". Roger Belbéoch died in Joinville-le-Pont on 5 November 2010 at the age of 89. He was buried in the Joinville cemetery beside his father, Joseph Belbéoch, who was killed in action on the Joinville bridge of the day of liberation.

== Publications ==
Belbéoch published an account of his wartime activities in 2007, "I only did my duty":

- Belbéoch, Roger; Brocvielle, Vincent (2007). Je n'ai fait que mon devoir: 1940-1944, un Juste dans les rangs de la police (in French). Robert Laffont. p. 149. ISBN 978-2-221-10844-4.

== Sources ==
- "Je n'ai fait que mon devoir : 1940-1944 : un Juste dans les rangs de la police". Au troisième oeil.
- Lallier, Rose; Logak, Elisabeth (2015). "Albert Ouzoulias (1915 – 1995)". Figures humaines. Archived from the original on 2015-06-03.
- Mullier, Nicole (December 2003). "Pour une histoire des Justes".
- "Robert Deloche". AJPN: Anonymes, Justes et Persécutés durant la période Nazie.
- Willot, Benoit (2007-02-16). "Roger Belbéoch, un Juste dans la police" (in French).
- Yad Vashem (2015). "Roger Belbéoch". AJPN: Anonymes, Justes et Persécutés durant la période Nazie dans les communes de France.
