= Démosthène Ollivier =

French businessman and politician

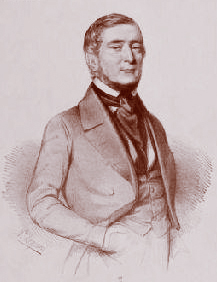
- Démosthène Ollivier c. 1848
- Born: 25 February 1799; Toulon, Var, France
- Died: 22 April 1884 (aged 85); Saint-Tropez, Var, France
- Occupations: Businessman, politician

Démosthène Ollivier (25 February 1799 – 22 April 1884) was a French businessman and politician. He was a staunch democrat and Republican, and was opposed to the Bourbon Restoration and the monarchy of Louis Philippe I. In the 1830s he was a friend of the Italian nationalist politician Giuseppe Mazzini. He was elected to the Constituent Assembly after the revolution of 1848. He protested the 1851 coup by Prince Louis Napoleon, and was forced into exile. His son Émile Ollivier became a prominent politician, and Démosthène Ollivier was allowed to return to France in 1860.

== Early years ==
Démosthène Ollivier was born in Toulon, Var on 25 February 1799. He entered commerce at a young age, and headed a trading house in Marseille dealing in fabrics. Démosthène Ollivier held democratic views, and was opposed to the Bourbon Restoration (1814–30). In 1822 Ollivier was denounced for having taken part in a plot against the monarchy, was arrested and condemned to six months in prison and a fine. Ollivier married Marie Geneviève Claire Perie. Their son Émile Ollivier was born in Marseille on 8 July 1825. Démosthène Ollivier was against the monarchy of Louis Philippe I (r, 1830–48).

Giuseppe Mazzini stayed with the Ollivier family in the early 1830s. In August 1832 Mazzini's close friend Giuditta Bellerio Sidoli gave birth to a boy, almost certainly Mazzini's son, whom she named Joseph Démosthène Adolpe Aristide after members of the Ollivier family. The Olliviers took care of the child in June 1833 when Giuditta and Mazzini left for Switzerland. The child died in February 1835. Ollivier became a municipal counselor in Marseille in 1836. His business ran into difficulty and went bankrupt, which compromised his political career. However, through relentless effort he was able to fulfill his obligations and obtain his rehabilitation. He left Marseille and moved to Paris, where he lived quietly and raised his large family.

== Second French Republic (1848–51) ==
After the February Revolution of 1848 Démosthène Ollivier had his 23-year-old son Émile Ollivier named commissary-general of the Republic in Marseille. (Note: Émile Ollivier (1825–1913) was the last minister of Napoleon III during the more liberal final phase of the Second French Empire. His granddaughter Solange Troisier was a prominent doctor and feminist after world War II (1939–45).) Démosthène Ollivier was elected on 23 April 1848 to represent Bouches-du-Rhône in the Constituent Assembly. In the opening session on 4 May 1848 he asked that the oath to the Republic be delivered individually to the tribune. What that was refused, he asked that the minutes record that our acclamation of the Republic was made unanimously. The whole assembly rose in assent to this motion. Ollivier became a member of the commerce committee. He voted with the most advanced faction of the Republican Party.

Ollivier was opposed to the lawsuits against Louis Blanc and Marc Caussidière after the June Days Uprising He was against restoration of civil imprisonment, and for abolition of the death penalty. He voted for the right to work, and against the order of the day in honor of General Louis-Eugène Cavaignac. He was in favor of amnesty, against the ban on clubs, against appropriations for the expedition to Rome, and for abolition of the tax on drinks, He opposed the policy of Prince Louis Napoleon Bonaparte, and was one of the signatories of the motion for the impeachment of the president and his ministers due to the events in Rome. Ollivier was not reelected to the Legislative Assembly, but continue to struggle for republican and radical ideas in his department.

== Later career ==
Ollivier protested vigorously against the coup of 2 December 1851, and was arrested and expelled from France. He took refuge first in Belgium and then in Italy during the Second French Empire (1852–70). He lived in Nice and then Florence. His son Émile Ollivier married Blandine Liszt, daughter of the composer Franz Liszt and Marie d'Agoult, on 22 October 1857. In 1859 Démosthène Ollivier was involved in a dispute over non-payment of a dowry that Marie d'Agoult had promised to pay the newly-wed couple. Démosthène Ollivier returned to France in 1860. He died in Saint-Tropez, Var on 22 April 1884.

== Sources ==
- Dutasta, Henri (1884). Le capitaine Vallé, ou l'armée sous la Restauration. F. Alcan.
- Guillaume de Wailly (2015). "Emile OLLIVIER". Geneanet (in French).
- Lecou, Victor (1849). "OLLIVIER (Demosthene)". Biographie des 900 représentants à la Constituante et des 750 représentants à la Législative: session de 1849. Lecou.
- Robert, Adolphe; Cougny, Gaston (1891). "Démosthène OLLIVIER". Dictionnaire des parlementaires français de 1789 à 1889 (in French). Paris: Bourloton.
- Sarti, Roland (1997-01-01). Mazzini: A Life for the Religion of Politics. Greenwood Publishing Group. ISBN 978-0-275-95080-4.
- "Solange Troissier (1919-2008)" (in French). AAIHP.
- Walker, Alan (1993). Franz Liszt: The Weimar Years, 1848-1861. Cornell University Press. ISBN 0-8014-9721-3.
