= Albert Ouzoulias =

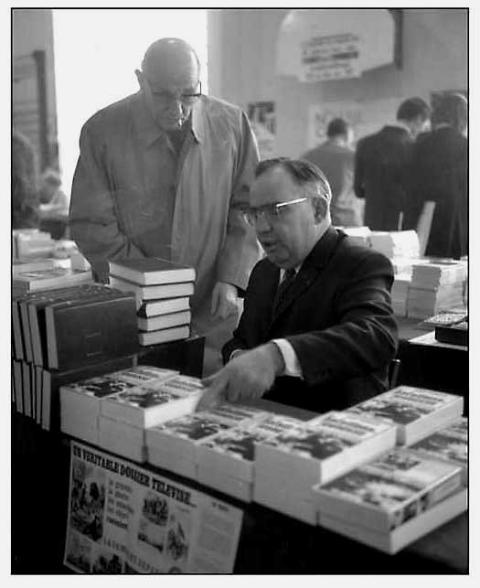
- Albert Ouzoulias (right)
- Born: 20 January 1915; Contrevoz, Ain, France
- Died: 27 November 1995 (aged 80); Créteil, Paris, France
- Other name: Colonel André
- Occupation: Postal worker
- Known for: French Resistance leader

Albert Ouzoulias (20 January 1915 – 27 November 1995) was a French politician and a Communist leader of the French Resistance during World War II (1939–45) using the name of "Colonel André". He played a major role in the 1944 liberation of Paris.

Ouzoulias was active in the youth organization of the French Communist Party before the war. He was enlisted in the army when the war broke out, was captured in 1940 and interned by the Germans, but escaped and made his way back to France in July 1941. There he took charge of fighting units organized from the Communist youth. He was assigned to various senior positions in the Communist resistance organization. He was in charge of all resistance forces in the Paris region at the time of the liberation of Paris by the Allied forces in August 1944. After this he was given responsibility for integrating the resistance fighters into the regular army. Despite his role in the Resistance, Ouzoulias did not play an important role in politics after the war, but was involved in municipal politics and veterans' organizations.

== Early years ==
Albert Georges Ouzoulias was born in Contrevoz, Ain on 20 January 1915. His father was killed during World War I (1914–18). He failed the entrance examination for the Normal School at Bourg-en-Bresse, and got a job at a postal sorting station. He was committed to pacifism and a follower of Henri Barbusse and Romain Rolland. Ouzoulias went to Paris to attend the European Anti-Fascist Workers' Congress at the Salle Pleyel in June 1933. From then on he was committed to this organization, which became the World Committee Against War and Fascism. In 1933 he joined the French Communist Party (Parti communiste français, PCF).

In 1934 Ouzoulias became in turn secretary of the World Committee in his commune of Virieu-le-Grand, Ain, departmental secretary of the Jeunes contre le fascisme (Youth Against Fascism), then member of the national committee of the movement. He joined the Jeunesse communiste (JC, Communist Youth) where he showed great energy. In 1935 he was called to Paris as a permanent member of the PCF and appointed to the JC national committee in charge of propaganda. He met Robert Deloche and the two men became friends. He accompanied a delegation led by Danielle Casanova to the International Communist Youth Congress in Moscow in 1935. Back in France he organized the founding congress of the French Union of Agricultural Youth and the Popular Front in the Ain. After his military service in 1936–38 he was elected JC secretary-general in the Rhône-Ain-Isère region.

In 1939 Ouzoulias met Cécile Romagon, a young activist, at a JC party. Ouzoulias was called up in March 1939, but remained in touch with Romagon whom he married on 11 May 1940. Immediately after the ceremony Ouzoulias went into action with the 12th Colonial Infantry Regiment of Agen, where he was an artillery observer. He was captured on 10 June 1940 and interned at Stalag XVIIB in Krems, Carinthia, Austria. In September 1940 he was transferred to Linz to undertake excavation and construction work. He escaped but was quickly recaptured. After hearing of the German attack on Russia, on the night of 25–26 July 1941 Ouzoulias and two companions escaped and hid on a train bound for France. He found his wife living under an assumed name in Reims with their son, Maurice, who had been born during his detention. He at once resumed contact with the party leadership.

== Resistance leader ==
On 2 August 1941 Ouzoulias met Danielle Casanova in Montparnasse and was put in charge of the Bataillons de la Jeunesse, fighting groups that were being created by the Jeunesse Communiste. He took the name of "Colonel André". Pierre Georges was made his second-in-command. Soon after Arthur Dallidet introduced him to Eugène Hénaff, who was responsible for the armed struggle under the direction of Charles Tillon. At this time the JC was mainly involved in propaganda, publishing tracts and clandestine newspapers, with minimal armed action. At a session in 15–17 August it was agreed that members of the JC should receive weapons training and should increase sabotage and attacks on occupation troops. There was some resistance, but with news of the execution of Henri Gautherot and Samuel Tyszelman the meeting agreed to take a more active role. In the weeks that followed Pierre Georges became primarily involved in military operations in the Paris region, while Ouzoulias was more concerned with recruitment and liaison between the regions. The attacks triggered harsh reprisals.

In October 1941 the PCF decided to unify armed groups into the Organisation Spéciale. In April 1942 the Francs-Tireurs et Partisans (FTP) was created, led by Charles Tillon. The FTP unified three Communist organizations, the Bataillons de la Jeunesse, the Organisation Spéciale and the Main d’oeuvre immigrée. Eugène Hénaff was political commissar, assisted by Ouzoulias. In May 1942 Ouzoulias was promoted to National Military Commissar. In 1942 Ouzoulias and Robert Deloche advised Roger Belbéoch to infiltrate the Parisian police. This resulted in Belbéoch joining the commissariat of the 12th arrondissement of Paris, in which position he could help members of the Resistance to gain false papers, and could help persecuted Jews.

Ouzoulias was a proponent of quick strikes against carefully studied targets by small groups of fighters, who would then rapidly withdraw. He also drew up guidelines for urban warfare in which FTP units could attack greatly superior German forces and be protected while they withdrew. Starting in 1943 Ouzoulias had a growing number of assistants to help him maintain contact with the regions, including his wife. Cécile Ouzoulias was arrested in April 1943 while using false papers, but was released in August 1943 due to being pregnant. She immediately went into hiding, and on 26 October 1943 gave birth to son, who was registered as Marc Hubert, "born of unknown parents." In November 1943 Joseph Epstein, the FTP Chief of Staff, was arrested and subjected to extreme torture, but revealed nothing. (Note: Epstein was shot at Fort Mont-Valérien on 11 April 1944. Ouzoulias called Joseph Epstein "the greatest military tactician of the entire Resistance.") This was followed by a major police operation that largely destroyed the FTP's Paris organization. From the end of 1943 the national organization began to intensify preparation for a national uprising to support the expected Allied landings in Europe.

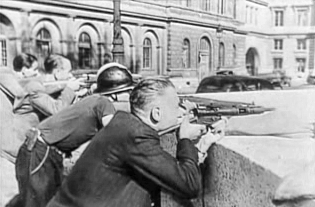
French résistants firing in a skirmish during the battle for Paris

From June to August 1944 Ouzoulias coordinated the FTP's military action in the Paris region. Ouzoulias and Colonel Henri Rol-Tanguy, who led the Île-de-France Resistance movement, planned a major rising in Paris which played a vital role during the August 1944 Liberation of Paris. On 28 August 1944 General Charles de Gaulle put Ouzoulias in charge of the FTP and FFI (Forces Françaises de l'Intérieur, or Free French). Five days after the surrender of Dietrich von Choltitz, the German governor of Paris, Ouzoulias assigned Pierre Georges the task of forming a battalion of resistance fighters. Georges ("Colonel Fabien") organized an FFI column, the Colonne Fabien that left Paris soon after the uprising in that city early in September 1944. The column was to form the nucleus of a Free French force in Lorraine, which would be joined by volunteers from Paris and the eastern regions of France as soon as possible. The French state would have to accept the fait accompli of the Free French army fighting on the front, which would become a "great people's army". In the autumn of 1944, Ouzoulias was charged by de Gaulle with integrating the FTP members with the regular French army.

== Later career ==
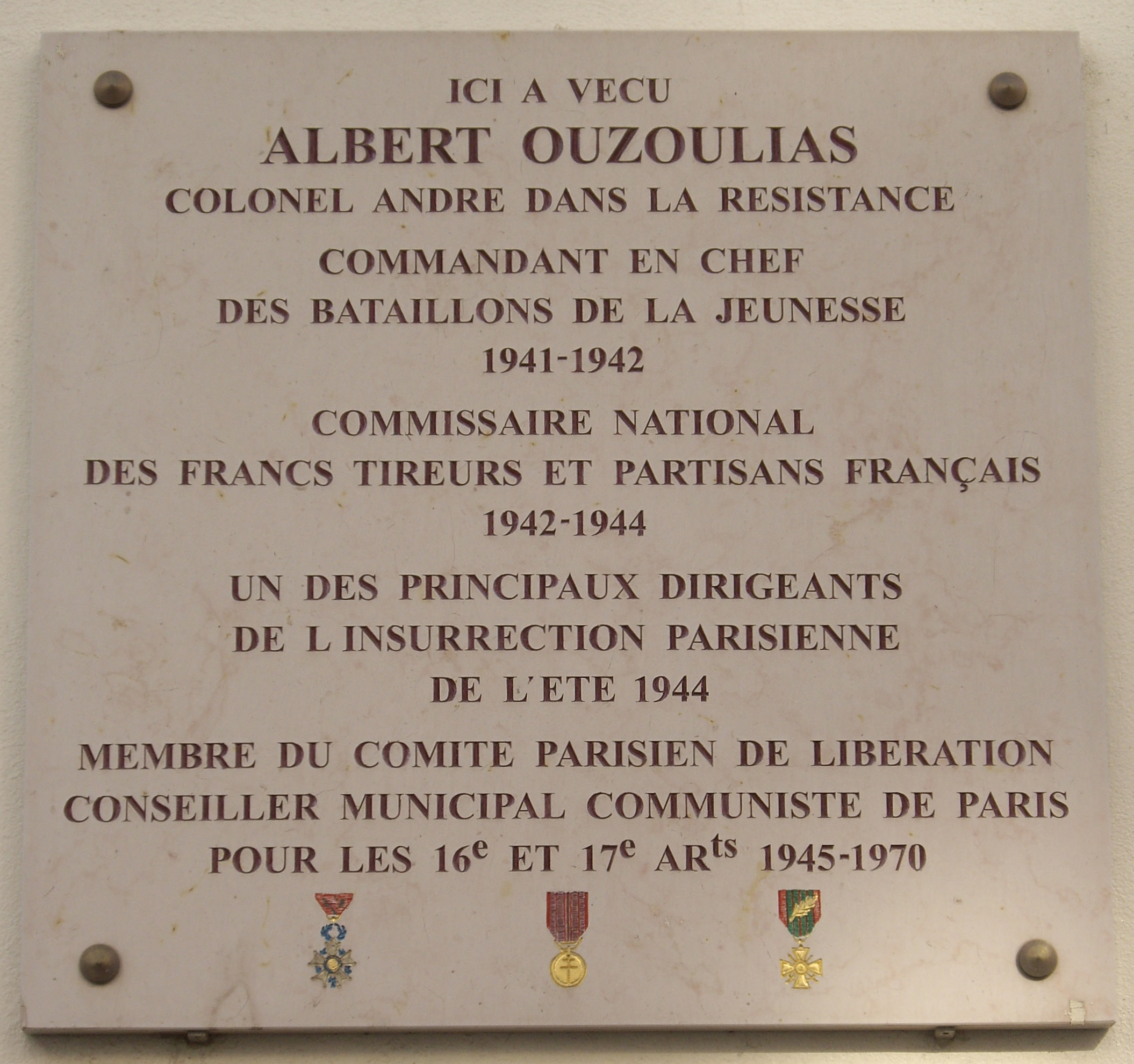
Commemorative plaque at Ouzoulias's home at 9 rue du Général-Niox, Paris 16

In 1946 Ouzoulias was awarded the Legion of Honour, but he did not play a major role in politics in the post-war years. He was elected to the Paris Municipal Council, where he took part in heated exchanges between the Gaullists and Communists. He was charged with various missions, including meetings with the Vietnamese forces before and after the French withdrawal from their colonies in Indo-China. In 1970 he became mayor of Palisse, Corrèze, where he lived in semi-retirement.

Ouzoulias was active in various associations of veterans of the Resistance. He was the first president of the Association des Amis des FTPF, and was involved in the Fédération internationale de la Résistance and the Association nationale des anciens Combattants de la Résistance. Ouzoulias wrote about the young communists who participated in the armed resistance in his 1967 Les Bataillons de la Jeunesse. His accounts tended to romanticize his subjects.

Albert Ouzoulias died on 27 November 1995.

== Publications ==
- Ouzoulias, Albert; Ch Tillon (1945). Le Colonel Fabien. Préf. de Ch. Tillon. Editions sociales. p. 72.
- Ouzoulias, Albert (1945). Un des libérateurs de Paris. Curial-Archereau. p. 72.
- Péron, Yves; Ouzoulias, Albert (1946). Pas de collaborateur dans une Assemblée français!: Frédéric Dupont, député P.R.L. doit être poursuivi et jugé. Éditions du Parti communiste français. p. 31.
- Ouzoulias, Albert (1969). Les bataillons de la jeunesse. Éditions Sociales. p. 495.
- Ouzoulias, Albert (1971). Maquis de Corrèze: par 120 témoins et combattants. Éd. sociales. p. 624.
- Ouzoulias, Albert; Pech, Karlheinz (1976). Die Bataillone der Jugend (Les bataillons de la jeunesse, dt.) Colonel Andre.
- Ouzoulias, Albert (1982). Les fils de la nuit. Grasset. p. 366.
- Ouzoulias, Albert (1999). Le maquis du calvaire: lieu de mémoire : Moret-sur-Loing. Association Nationale des Anciens Combattants de la Résistance Comité de Seine et Marne.

== Sources ==
- Calvès, André (1996). "La Colonne Fabien" (in French).
- Johnson, Douglas (6 December 1995). "Obituary: Albert Ouzoulias". The Independent (UK). Archived from the original on 2015-05-22.
- Lallier, Rose; Logak, Elisabeth (2015). "Albert Ouzoulias (1915 – 1995)". Figures humaines. Archived from the original on 2015-06-03.
- Liaigre, Franck (2006). "ROSSEL-KIRSCHEN André ...". Communisme 87 - Regards Sur Le Communisme Britanique. L'AGE D'HOMME. ISBN 978-2-8251-3751-2.
- Nivet, Philippe (1994). Le Conseil municipal de Paris de 1944 à 1977. Publications de la Sorbonne. ISBN 978-2-85944-244-6.
- Pigenet, Michel (5 September 2014). "La colonne Fabien, de la Mutualité à Sigmaringen". L'Humanité.
- Porin, Axel (2004). "Albert Ouzoulias". La Résistance en Ile-de-France. AERI.
- Zuccotti, Susan (1999). The Holocaust, the French, and the Jews. U of Nebraska Press. ISBN 0-8032-9914-1.
