= Jean Troisier =

French doctor and biologist

Jean Antoine Ernest Troisier
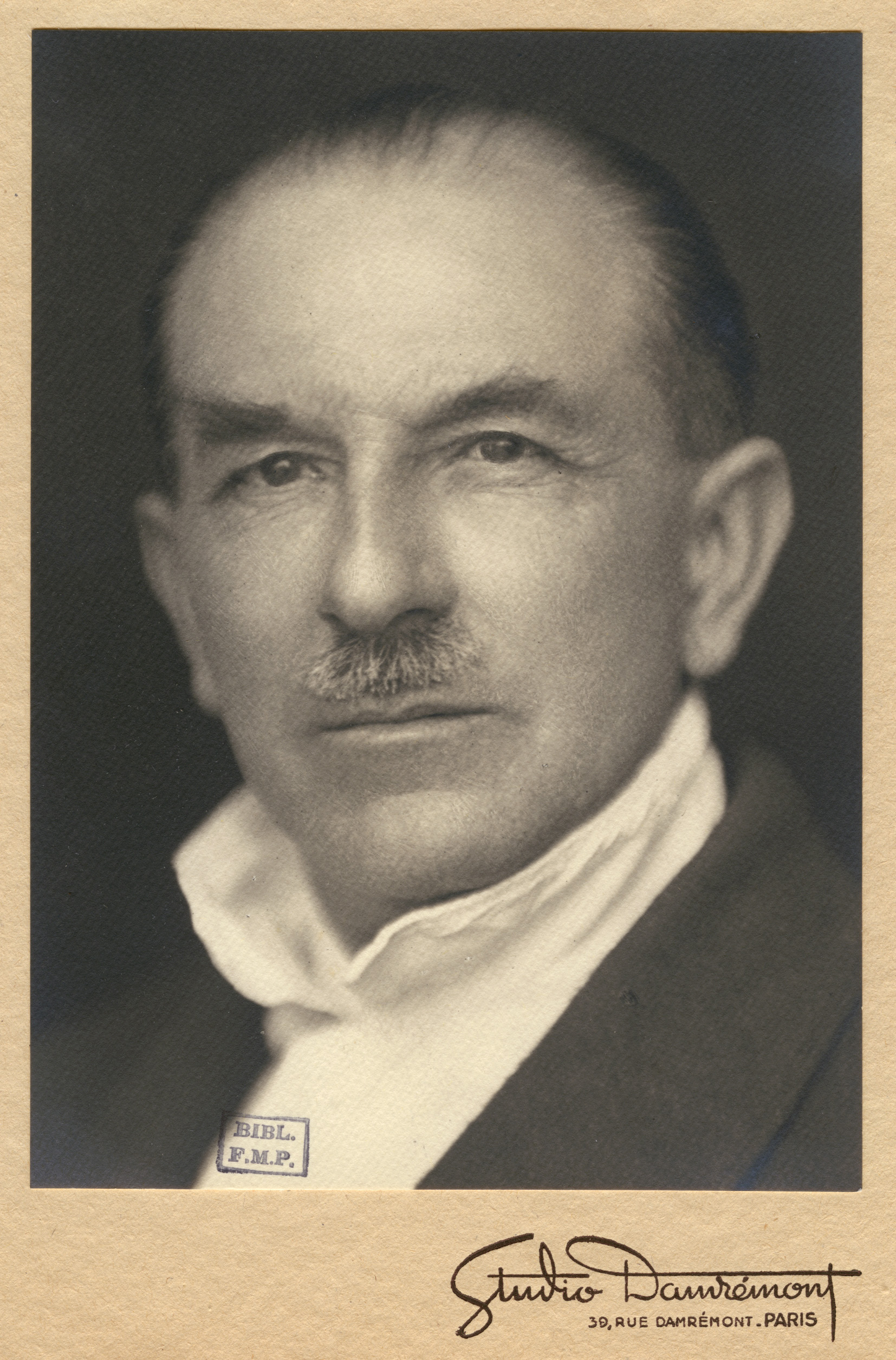
- Born: 18 May 1881; Paris, France
- Died: 31 October 1945 (aged 64); Paris, France
- Occupations: Physician, medical researcher
- Known for: Laboratory Director of the Pasteur Institute

Jean Antoine Ernest Troisier (18 May 1881 – 31 October 1945) was a French doctor and biologist who headed a laboratory of the Pasteur Institute for several years. He was recognized as an authority on tuberculosis and cancer.

== Early years ==
Jean Antoine Ernest Troisier was the son of Charles Émile Troisier, professor of medicine at the University of Paris. His daughter, Solange Troisier (1919–2008) was a doctor and a leading feminist.

From 1903 to 1905, Troisier was an extern at the Hôpitaux de Paris while studying under Louis Landouzy and Anatole Chauffard. From 1906 to 1909, he was an intern at the Hôpitaux de Paris. In 1909 Troisier and Georges Roux described experimental research they had conducted on the tetanus toxin at a meeting of the Société Médicale des Hôpitaux. Troiser was one of the French researchers who undertook a thorough study of pigments of bilirubin or a similar substance in haemorrhagic effusions. He published a doctoral thesis describing his work and that of others until 1910.His thesis was titled Rôle des Hémolysines dans les genèse des pigments biliaires et de l'urobiline (role of hemolysin in the genesis of bile pigments and Urobilin).

== Career ==
Troisier was appointed head of the medical clinic at the Hôpital Laennec (Paris) in 1910. From 1911–22 he was head of pathological anatomy and bacteriology at the Medical Faculty of Paris, where he studied the role of hemolysins in the process of degradation of hemoglobin. At the French Medical Congress in Lyon on 21–25 October 1911 Troisier and Georges Guillain presented their findings on the causes and effects of the destruction of blood corpuscles and its relationship to jaundice. He began research in icterohemorrhagic spirochetoses in 1914–18. In 1921 he was appointed a Doctor of the Hôpitaux de Paris. Troisier was named laboratory head at the Pasteur Institute in 1926. He was responsible for the "monkey" laboratory, funded by Princess Marie Bonaparte of Greece. She was a close friend of the family. This laboratory undertook experiments on non human primates. From 1920–31 Troisier researched subjects such as the etiology and pathogenesis of meningeal spirochaetose; transplants of human cancers in chimpanzees, tuberculosis, typhus fever and the blood groups of chimpanzees. From 1931–38 he studied tuberculosis; acute spirochaetose; spotted fever; microbial diseases; blood diseases and the genetic study of varicose veins.

Troisier was head doctor at the Hôpital Sainte-Perrine (1927–28) and the Hôpital Bichat (1929–31) in Paris. From 1932 to 1938 he was responsible for experimental pathology at the faculty of medicine in Paris. He also worked as head doctor at the Hôpital de Beaujon, Hôpital de Beaujon-Clichy and Hôpital Laennec in this period. In 1933 he and Yves Boquien published a monograph that gave a complete account of current understanding of Meningeal Spirochaetosis, covering historical, pathological, clinical and experimental aspects. In 1935 he published a 280-page book on "Recent Experimental Studies on Infectious Diseases" (Études expérimentales récentes sur les maladies infectieuses). It discussed viral diseases, spirochaetosis and related diseases, bacterial infections such as typhoid fever and tetanus, infections due to acid-fast bacilli including leprosy and tuberculosis, agranulocytosis and kidney diseases. A reviewer said "The description of the various diseases is clear and concise, but in a work of this kind the absence of an index and a bibliography is regrettable."

In 1938 Troisier was made a knight of the Legion of Honour. He continued to work at the Hôpital Laennec and the Institut Pasteur, studying tuberculosis and other subjects. In 1943 he was elected a member of the Académie Nationale de Médecine. His 103-page 1944 monograph co-authored with J. van der Stegen, Méthode génétique et tuberculose pulmonaire, was derided by one reviewer, who wrote, "Without reservation, the book can be recommended for the purpose of demonstrating how studies in human genetics should not be conducted. At the time of his death on 31 October 1945 at the age of 64 he was professor at the Paris faculty of medicine and the Institut Pasteur, and was recognized as an authority on tuberculosis and cancer.

== Selected publications ==
- Jean Troisier; Georges Guillain (1909). Physiologie pathologique de l'hématome pleural traumatique; la biligénie hémolytique locale, par Georges Guillain,... et Jean Troisier,... impr. de "La Semaine médicale. p. 35.
- Jean Troisier; Anatole-Marie-Emile Chauffard (1909). Abcès gazeux présternal et rétrosternal par infection anaérobique, sérodiagnostic anaérobique, par A. Chauffard,... et Jean Troisier,... impr. de la "Semaine médicale. p. 16.
- Jean Troisier; Dr. Léon-Eugène-Joseph Tixier (1910). Arthropathies auto-toxiques dans un cas d'hémoglobinurie paroxystique, par MM. Léon Tixier et Jean Troisier... p. 8.
- Jean Troisier (1910). Rôle des hémolysines dans la genèse des pigments biliaires et de l'urobiline. G. Steinheil. p. 97.
- Jean Troisier (1911). Du Rôle des hémolysines en pathologie, exposé général du sujet par MM. les docteurs Georges Guillain,... et Jean Troisier,... A. Rey. p. 78.
- S. Costa; Jean Troisier (1918). La Spirochétose ictéro-hémorragique, par S. Costa et J. Troisier. Vigot frères. p. 31.
- Jean Troisier; Mme. Jenny Roudinesco (Dr Marie- Jenny-Emile Weiss); G. Develay; J. Weiss-Roudinesco (1929). Sensibilité à la tuberculine provoquée chez le vieillard par le B. C. G., par MM. J. Troisier,... S. Develay et J. Weiss-Roudinesco,... Masson. p. 15.
- Jean Troisier; Dr. Robert Clément (1930). Les Ictères infectieux. Étude clinique et étiologique, par Jean Troisier et Robert Clément. Avec treize tracés dans le texte. Gaston Doin et Cie éditeurs. p. 152.
- Jean Troisier; M. Monnerot-Dumaine; Simone Develay (1931). La Fièvre quintane, sa valeur sémiologique, par Jean Troisier,... M. Monnerot-Dumaine et Simone Develay,... Masson. p. 16.
- Jean Troisier; Roger Cattan (1932). Neutropénie curable d'origine tuberculeuse, par Jean Troisier et Roger Cattan. G. Doin.
- Jean Troisier; T. de Sanctis Monaldi; Roger Cattan; Mme Kourilsky (1932). Bacillémie tuberculeuse au cours d'infections aiguës non tuberculeuses. Le bacille de Koch, virus de sortie, par Jean Troisier et T. de Sanctis Monaldi, avec la collaboration de R. Cattan et Mme Kourilsky... Masson. p. 15.
- Jean Troisier; Roger Cattan (1932). Ictère hémolytique avec leuco-érythroblastose. Splénectomie. Guérison...
- Jean Troisier; Yves Boquien (1933). La spirochétose méningée. Masson & cie. p. 187.
- Jean Troisier (1934). La Fièvre boutonneuse expérimentale, par MM. Jean Troisier et Roger Cattan... Masson. p. 24.
- Jean Troisier (1935). Études expérimentales récentes sur les maladies infectieuses. Masson. p. 277.
- Jean Troisier; J. Sifferlen (Melle.); Dr. Georges Brouet (1935). Spirochétose méningée et méningotyphus, critique nosologique... Masson. p. 23.
- Jean Troisier; Jules-Jean-Louis Le Melletier (1941). Splénopneumonies tuberculeuses curables et épituberculoses, par MM. J. Troisier et J. Le Melletier,... Masson. p. 24.
- Jean Troisier; Maurice Bariéty; Denyse Kohler (1941). Adrénaline, volume pulmonaire et pression intrapleurale, par MM. Jean Troisier, Maurice Bariéty et Denyse Kohler... Masson. p. 31.
- Jean Troisier; Marcel Moine (1942). Essai d'évaluation de la morbidité tuberculeuse en France de 1936 à 1938, par MM. Jean Troisier et Marcel Moine. Masson. p. 19.
- Jean Troisier; Dr. Roger-Georges Lesobre (1942). Le Drainage cavitaire avec aspiration réglée, méthode de Monaldi... Masson. p. 27.
- Jean Troisier; Dr. Georges Poix (1943). Les Bases doctrinales de la lutte contre la tuberculose, par J. Troisier et G. Poix... Masson. p. 12.
- Pierre Chadourne; Jean Troisier; J. Beaudouin (1943). Volumineuse caverne tuberculeuse de la base traitée par la méthode de Monaldi: guérison maintenue depuis neuf mois, par J. Troisier, P. Chadourne et J. Beaudouin. Masson. p. 240.
- Jean Troisier; Dr. Suzanne Lamotte-Barrillon (1943). Fréquence actuelle de la méningite tuberculeuse de l'enfant, par le professeur J. Troisier et Mme Lamotte-Barrillon,... Masson. p. 11.
- Jean Troisier; J. van der Stegen (1944). Méthode génétique et tuberculose pulmonaire. Masson. p. 101.

== Sources ==
- Bertin, Celia (2010). The last Bonaparte. Academic Bookstore Perrin. ISBN 978-2262033538.
- Bourgeron, Jean-Pierre (1997). Marie Bonaparte. PUF, Coll. Psychoanalysts today. ISBN 2130481493.
- "Jean Troisier (1881-1945)". Institut Pasteur. Archived from the original on 2015-09-24.
- Kallmann, Franz J. (June 1948). "Review of Méthode génétique et tuberculose pulmonaire". The Quarterly Review of Biology. 23 (2). The University of Chicago Press: 180. doi:10.1086/396369. JSTOR 2811859.
- Karamanou, Marianna; Laios, Konstantinos; Tsoucalas, Gregory; Machairas, Nikolaos; Androutsos, George (2014). "Charles-Emile Troisier (1844-1919) and the clinical description of signal node" (PDF). Journal of Balkan Union of Oncology. 19 (4): 1133–5. ISSN 2241-6293. PMID 25536635. Archived from the original (PDF) on 2015-04-12.
- "Notes On Books". The British Medical Journal. 1 (3781): 1110. 24 June 1933. doi:10.1136/bmj.1.3781.1110. JSTOR 25317925. S2CID 220020800.
- "Notes On Books". The British Medical Journal. 1 (3926): 698. 4 April 1936. doi:10.1136/bmj.1.3926.698. JSTOR 25352223. S2CID 220025102.
- "Solange Troissier (1919-2008)" (in French). AAIHP.
- "Special Correspondence: Paris". The British Medical Journal. 2 (2553): 1649. 4 December 1909. doi:10.1136/bmj.2.2553.1649. JSTOR 25288788. S2CID 220175037.
- "The Following Well-Known Medical Men Have Recently Died Abroad". The British Medical Journal. 1 (4435). 5 January 1946. JSTOR 20365152.
- "The Twelfth French Medical Congress". The British Medical Journal. 2 (2653): 1207. 4 November 1911. doi:10.1136/bmj.2.2653.1207. JSTOR 25294880. PMC 2335038.
- Van Den Bergh, Hijmans (20 September 1924). "Discussion On Jaundice". The British Medical Journal. 2 (3325): 495–503. JSTOR 20437801.
