= Hôtel de Ville, Joinville-le-Pont =

Town hall in Joinville-le-Pont, France

Hôtel de Ville
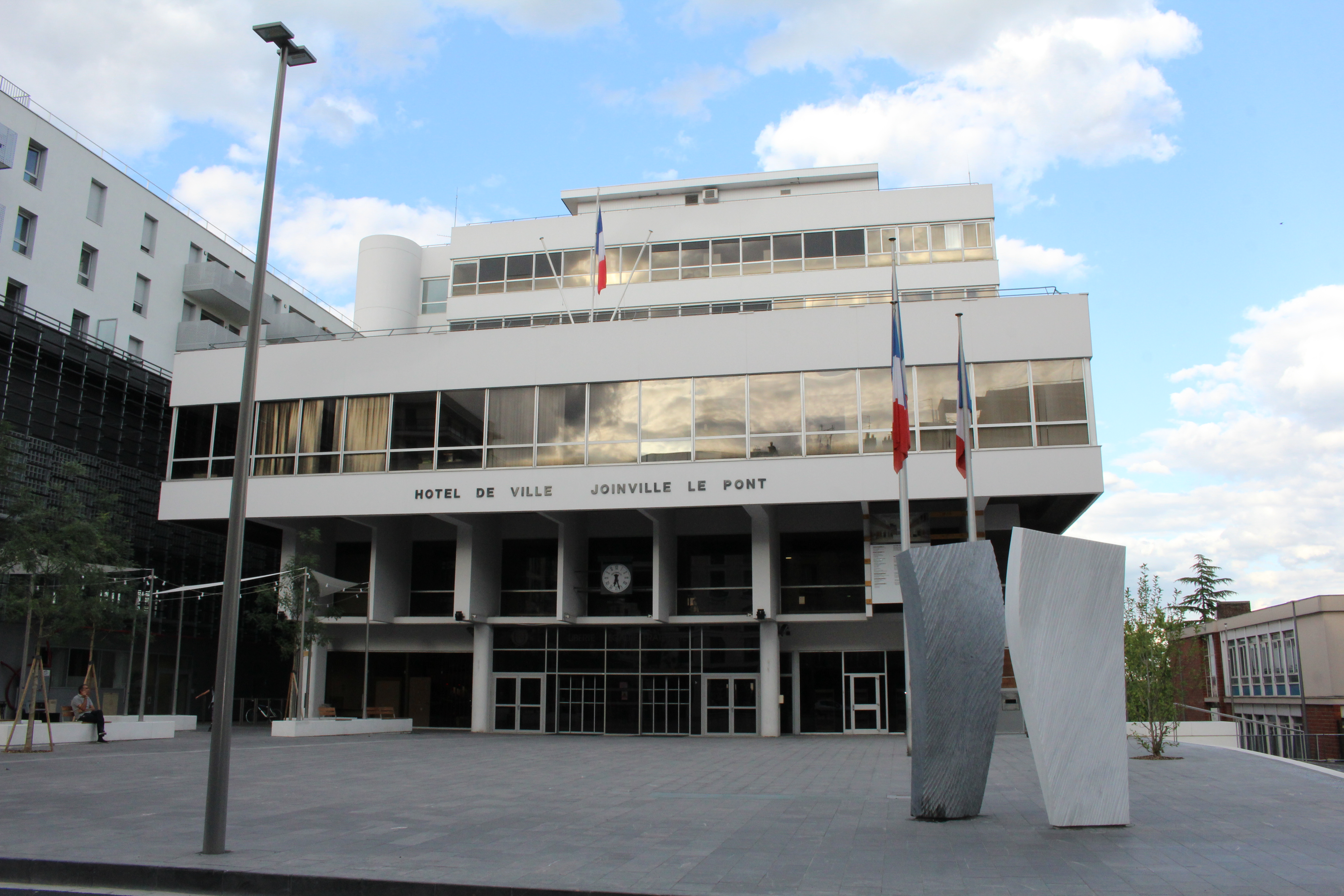
- The main frontage of the Hôtel de Ville in September 2019

General information
- Type: City hall
- Architectural style: Modern style
- Location: Joinville-le-Pont, France
- Coordinates: 48.8184°N 2.4668°E
- Completed: 1976

Design and construction
- Architects: Robert and Gilbert Picquenard

The Hôtel de Ville (French pronunciation: [otɛl də vil], City Hall) is a municipal building in Joinville-le-Pont, Val-de-Marne, in the southeastern suburbs of Paris, standing on Rue de Paris.

== History ==
The old town hall

The new reception area

=== The old town hall ===
Following the French Revolution, the new town council initially met in the home of the mayor at the time. This arrangement continued until the mid-19th century, when the council led by the mayor, Apollon Delaherche, decided to commission a combined town hall and school. The site they selected was on the northeastern side of Rue de Paris. The new building was designed by Claude Naissant in the neoclassical style, built in ashlar stone and was completed in 1851.

The design involved a symmetrical main frontage of three bays facing onto the street. The central bay featured a segmental-headed doorway with a hood mould on the ground floor, a round-headed window with voussoirs on the first floor, and a clock above. Behind the clock, there was an octagonal lantern with a finial. The outer bays were fenestrated by small segmental-headed windows on the ground floor and by round-headed windows with voussoirs on the first floor. Wings were added to a design by Frédéric Marin, Joseph Graf and Alexandre Borgeaud in 1910.

Following the Paris insurrection of 19 August 1944, part the Second World War, a liberation committee led by Robert Deloche entered and occupied the town hall the following day. This was five days before the liberation of the town by the French 2nd Armoured Division, commanded by General Philippe Leclerc, on 26 August 1944.

=== The current town hall ===
In October 1968, following significant population growth, the council led by the mayor, Georges-Maurice Defert, decided to demolish the old town hall and to erect a modern town hall on the same site. The foundation stone for the new building was laid on 13 October 1973. It was designed by Robert Picquenard and his son, Gilbert Picquenard, in the modern style, built in concrete and glass and was officially opened on 27 June 1976.

The complex was laid out as a three-storey office tower sitting on a four-storey podium, which accommodated the public-facing areas. The design of the podium involved a main frontage of seven bays facing onto a public square, now known as Place Georges Defert. The main entrance was on the first floor of the podium, and the bays were flanked by columns surmounted by piers which supported the top floor of the podium, which projected forward and fenestrated by 18 plate glass windows. Internally, the principal rooms was the Salle des Fêtes (ballroom) on the top floor of the podium at the front of the building, and the two-storey library with good views over the River Marne at the rear of the building.

A major programme of refurbishment works, involving improvements to the reception area and the installation of a new reception desk in order to streamline visitor flows, was undertaken at a cost of €2.2 million to a design by Atelier Aconcept and completed in September 2019.
