= Samuel Tyszelman =

Polish communist (1921–1941)

- Born: 21 January 1921; Puławy, Poland
- Died: 19 August 1941 (aged 20); Châtenay-Malabry, Hauts-de-Seine, France
- Known for: French Resistance

Samuel Tyszelman (born Szmul Cecel Tyszelman; 21 January 1921 – 19 August 1941) was a Jewish Polish communist who was a member of the French Resistance during World War II (1939-1945). He and another man were arrested and executed for taking part in an anti-German demonstration. That started a series of assassinations and reprisals in which over 500 people were killed.

== Life ==
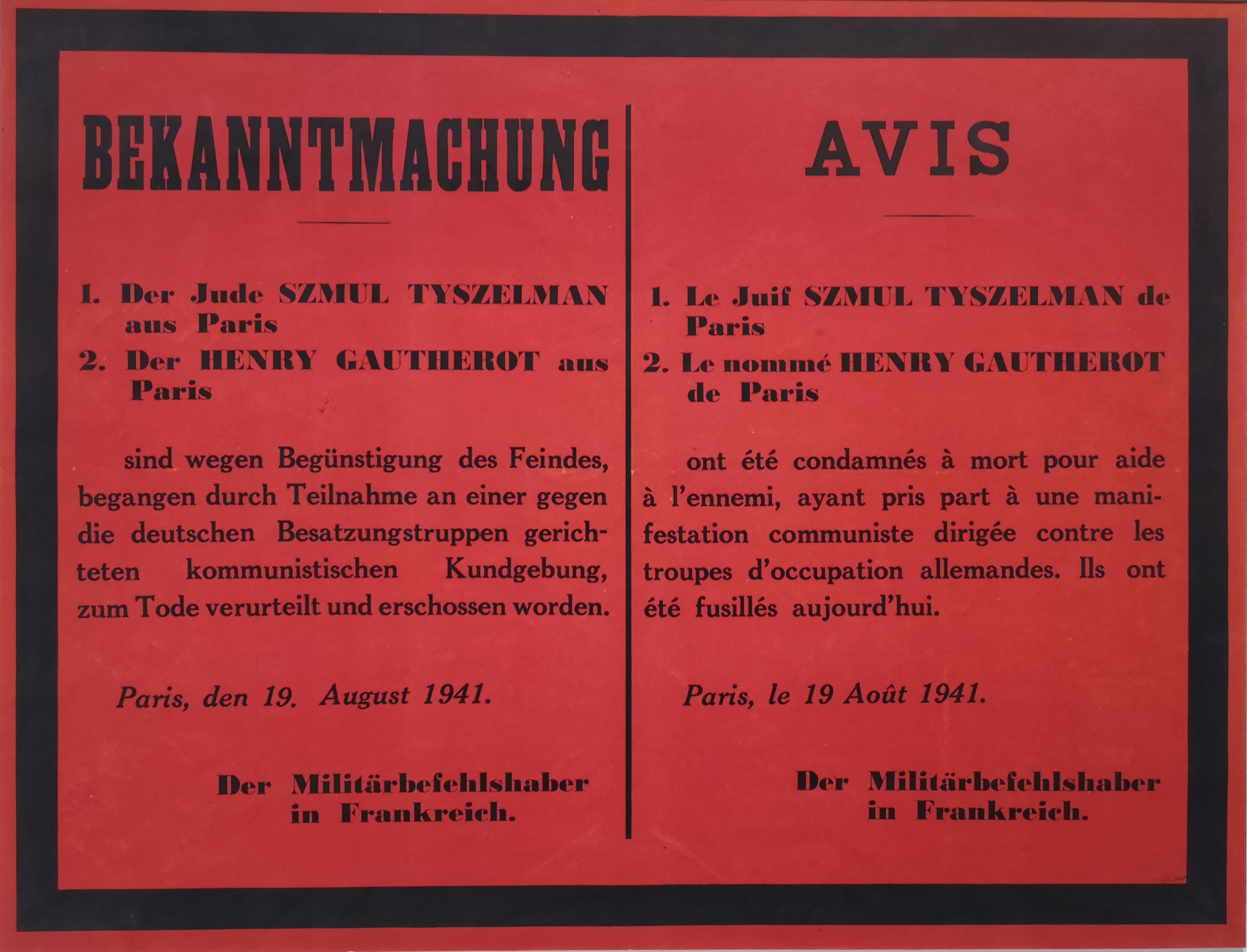
Poster announcing that Tyszelman and Gautherot had been executed

Szmul Cecel Tyszelman was born in Puławy, Poland, on 21 January 1921. His family was Jewish. During World War II (1939–1945), he was a member of the French communist resistance organization known as Bataillons de la jeunesse. He was in a group named the Main-d'Oeuvre Immigrée, whose members were Jews who had migrated from Eastern Europe in the 1920s and the 1930s. In early August 1941, three of them (Tyzelman, Charles Wolmark and Elie Walach) stole 25 kilograms (55 lb) of dynamite from a quarry in the Seine-et-Oise.

On 13 August 1941, Tyszelman, known as "Titi", was among a group of 100 young people, male and female, who walked out of the Strasbourg – Saint-Denis metro station and followed the tricolour flag of student Olivier Souef. They sang la Marseillaise and shouted "Down with Hitler! Vive La France!" French and German police intervened. German soldiers opened fire, and Tyzelman was hit in the leg. Gautherot fled, but was pursued by a German civilian and caught in a porter's lodge at 37 Boulevard Saint-Martin.

Tyszelman, pursued by German soldiers who were aided by an emergency police van of the 19th arrondissement, was finally arrested in a cellar of 29 Boulevard Magenta, where he had taken refuge.

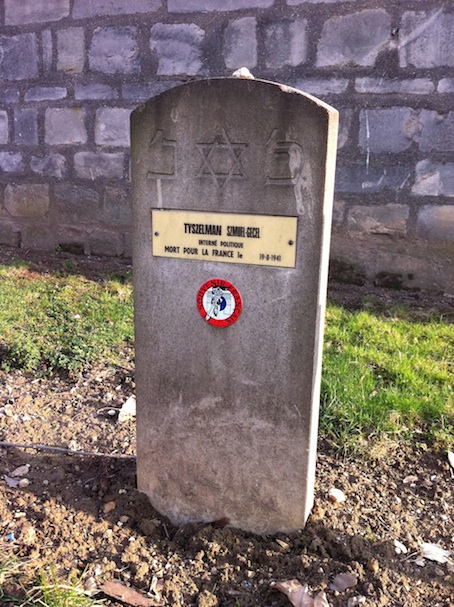
Tyszelman's tomb

On 14 August, the Militärbefehlshaber in Frankreich (MBF: "German Military Commander in France") banned the French Communist Party and announced that anyone who took part in a communist demonstration in the future would be charged with aiding the enemy. Tyszelman and Gautherot were tried by a German military tribunal and sentenced to death. They were executed by firing squad on 19 August 1941 at the Vallée-aux-Loups in Châtenay-Malabry, Hauts-de-Seine. Notices in black lettering on red paper were posted the same day to announce the sentence and the execution.

== Aftermath ==
Until this time the Jeunesses Communistes (JC: Young Communists) were mainly involved in propaganda, publishing tracts and clandestine newspapers, with minimal armed action. At a session from 15 to 17 August it was agreed that members of the JC should receive weapons training and should increase sabotage and attacks on occupation troops. There was some resistance but with news of the execution of Gautherot and Tyszelman it was agreed to take a more active role. Of the JC leaders, Pierre Georges became primarily involved in military operations in the Paris region, while Albert Ouzoulias was more concerned with recruitment and liaison between the regions. On 21 August Pierre Georges and three companions made a revenge killing of a German soldier named Alfons Moser when he was boarding a train at the Barbès metro station at eight in the morning. When Adolf Hitler heard of Moser's death he ordered that one hundred hostages be executed at once. The German military commander in France, Otto von Stülpnagel, did not want to upset the Vichy government. He told Vichy he just wanted ten hostages, who would be shot if any Germans were attacked. On 27 August 1941 three Communists were sentenced to death by guillotine and were executed the next day. Over the next few days five more communists who had taken part in Tyszelman's demonstration were shot and then three Gaullists. This was the start of a series of assassinations and reprisals that resulted in five hundred French hostages being executed in the next few months.
