= Robert Deloche =

- Born: 20 November 1909; Lyon, France
- Died: 12 May 1988 (aged 78); Antibes, Alpes-Maritimes, France
- Occupation: Furrier
- Known for: Mayor of Joinville-le-Pont

Robert Deloche (20 November 1909 – 12 May 1988) was a French furrier, trade unionist, politician, militant communist, member of the French Resistance and mayor of Joinville-le-Pont.

== Early years ==
Robert Deloche was born on 20 November 1909 in Lyon, Rhône. His first job was as a furrier. In 1928, he found work as a library clerk in the editorial office of the Communist daily l'Humanité. In 1929, he joined the propaganda department of French Communist Party. He undertook his military service from 1929 to 1932, reaching the rank of Brigadier of the Spahis. After discharge in 1932, he lived in Saint-Maur-des-Fossés, where he founded the Committee of Unemployed of Champigny-sur-Marne, then obtained a job as a furrier. He was dismissed for participating in a strike.

In February 1933, Deloche was elected Assistance Treasurer of the Union of Garment Furriers of the Seine. He belonged to the Saint-Maur branch of the World Committee Against War and Fascism. In 1935, Deloche moved to Joinville-le-Pont where he ran successfully as a Communist in municipal elections of 5 and 12 May 1935. He met Albert Ouzoulias around this time, and the two men became friends. He ran for the national legislature in the elections of 26 April 1936, but retired in the second round in favor of the Socialist candidate, who was elected.

Deloche became assistant secretary of the colonial section of the French Communist Party in October 1936. In 1937, he joined the office of the Algerian Communist Party. A report that Deloche wrote on the situation in Algeria for the French Communist Party was sent to Comintern in Moscow. Deloche wrote that it was "necessary to purge certain Trotskyite agitators, such as Albert Camus ... who have developed a systematic campaign of calumny against the directors of the French Communist Party and its political line." Deloche returned to France in 1938. He met and befriended Roger Belbéoch at the end of the 1930s.

== World War II ==
On the eve of World War II (1939–45), Deloche was mobilized on 27 August 1939 with the rank of brigadier. On 9 February 1940, he was dismissed as Councillor of Joinville-le-Pont for belonging to the Communist Party. He moved to England, where he was discharged on 28 July 1940. He returned, clandestinely, to France at the request of the party. He was arrested on 4 August 1941 while working at Chenard-Walcker in Gennevilliers and interned at Châteaubriant, Loire-Inférieure. After an attempted escape, he was moved to Voves, Eure-et-Loir. He escaped during the night of 18–19 July 1942 and went underground.

In 1942, Ouzoulias and Robert Deloche advised Roger Belbéoch to infiltrate the Parisian police. This resulted in Belbéoch joining the commissariat of the 12th arrondissement of Paris, in which position he could help members of the Resistance to gain false papers, and could help persecuted Jews. At the time of the Liberation of Paris, Deloche was commander of the FTP (Francs-Tireurs et Partisans) responsible for the Paris East region. In the autumn of 1944, Deloche was designated chairman of the special delegation of Joinville-le-Pont, and thus as acting mayor.

== Post-war career ==
In April 1945, Deloche was elected Municipal Councillor of Joinville-le-Pont and, on 26 October 1945, was elected mayor. In the same year, Deloche was elected General Councillor of the Seine for the canton of Saint-Maur-des-Fossés, of which Joinville was part. As mayor, Deloche's main achievement was construction of the Joinville-le-Pont stadium on the Avenue des Canadiens. He also supported the film industry, which was very important to the town. He created the municipal health center in February 1949, and developed two vacation centers.

Deloche resigned as mayor in November 1951, ostensibly for health reasons. In 1952, he was dismissed from the Communist Party for divisive arrogance and for living above his means. In January 1953, he resigned from the Joinville municipal council. He moved to Algeria and, in 1962, became a member of the cabinet of the Minister of Agriculture in the first government of independent Algeria. He remained in Algeria until 1971, when he retired to the south of France. Deloche died in Antibes, Alpes-Maritimes on 12 May 1988.

== Sources ==
- Lallier, Rose; Logak, Elisabeth (2015). "Albert Ouzoulias (1915 – 1995)". Figures humaines. Archived from the original on 2015-06-03.
- "Robert Deloche". AJPN: Anonymes, Justes et Persécutés durant la période Nazie.
- Todd, Olivier (2011-09-07). Albert Camus: A Life. Knopf Doubleday Publishing Group. ISBN 978-0-307-80476-1.
- Willot, Benoit (20 November 2009). "Robert Deloche : 100 ans". Histoire politique de Joinville.
