= Colonne Fabien =

- Active: 1944–45
- Country: France
- Allegiance: Free French
- Type: Irregular

Commanders
- Notable commanders: Pierre Georges

The Colonne Fabien (Note: The Colonne Fabien took various names. It was originally called the 1st FFI Regiment of Paris, then the Battle Group Lorraine (GTL: Groupement tactique lorraine). On 28 November it was renamed the 1st FFI Brigade of Paris, and on 13 January 1945 it became the 151st Infantry Regiment, with 2,400 men.) (Fabien Column) was an irregular force of mostly Communist volunteers that was formed in Alsace, France in September 1944 after the Liberation of Paris. It was led by Pierre Georges (1919–44), who took the alias Colonel Fabien. The column was absorbed by the French army in November 1944. Fabien and his volunteers are celebrated by the Communists, but for many years there was little official recognition of the force's actions.

== Formation ==
Five days after the surrender of Dietrich von Choltitz, the German governor of Paris, Albert Ouzoulias ("Colonel André") of the national committee of Francs-Tireurs et Partisans (FTP) called a meeting at which Pierre Georges ("Colonel Fabien") was assigned the task of forming a battalion of resistance fighters. Colonel Fabien organized a Free French (FFI: Forces Françaises de l'Intérieur) column that left Paris soon after the uprising in that city early in September 1944. The column was to form the nucleus of a Free French force in Lorraine, which would be joined by volunteers from Paris and the eastern regions of France as soon as possible. The French state would have to accept the fait accompli of the Free French army fighting on the front, which would become a "great people's army".

The project was supported by the French Communist Party but not by the French military command, although the army did not use force to prevent it. Some FFI units from the Reuilly barracks and Fort de Bicêtre in Paris managed to join the column, despite lack of vehicles and obstacles created by the army. The force was called the Groupe Tactique Lorraine (GTL) and mostly consisted of FTP veterans led by Communist officers. The volunteers were aged 24.1 years on average, mostly from the working-class districts of the capital. 80% of the men and 53% of the officers were working class. A company led by Captain Neuville, commanded by Saint-Cyr cadets, was an exception.

== Independent activities ==
Soldier committees were established, and publications of the Communist party distributed widely. The French authorities refused to provide any supplies, so the GTL was forced to resort to requisitions. Eventually Colonel Fabien managed to join up with General Edwin Walker's corps, and the GTL soldiers received canned food from the US army. The unit was assigned to clean-up operations and support in the rear of the 1st US Army and then the 3rd US Army. The first real battle test was on the Moselle front at Garche on 23 September and Gravelotte on 26–27 September. The troops had endured mortar fire without helmets, and suffered casualties that included Captain Neuville. They managed to recover American rifles from the dead, and gradually became fully armed. The losses forced a rigorous review of ranks, intensified military training and greater discipline.

The GTL was deployed near Thionville in October. Colonel Fabien managed to obtain uniforms for the men, and tried to train the men to accept commands without question, so the GTL would appear as an ordinary military unit to the French and Americans. This was not easy with men who considered that they were proletarians rather than soldiers. Morale began to fall as the men were not assigned useful duties. They mixed with the local miners and steel workers, held committee meetings and tried to replace unpopular officers. Some deserted, and in some cases the military authorities helped them return to civilian life. The GTL reached Montmédy in late October, where it was joined by an FFI unit from Paris that had managed to evade the authorities. These were the last reinforcements to meet the GTL. Captain Neuville's company broke up, and one section deserted with its equipment. The army provided papers to the deserters.

== Integration with the army ==
Fabien moved increasingly toward the political right. He had a guard composed only of Arabs, an officer's mess was established, a chaplain was appointed and officers began to ride horses. Attempts were made to break up the soldiers' committees. Some of the officers and men began to become reconciled to the idea of becoming part of the regular army. Other simply deserted, saying they planned to join the regular army, where they would be better treated. The final blow came when the government insisted that the GTL become integrated with the First French Army of General Jean de Lattre de Tassigny. Some of the soldiers left for civilian life, while others signed up in exchange for promises of full equipment and the benefits provided by the army, expecting conscription to soon be imposed anyway.

After intensive negotiations, on 10 November 1944 the formation came under the command of General de Lattre. Solange Troisier was engaged as a doctor for the Colonne Fabien after it was attached to the regular army. Colonel Fabien was killed in a mine explosion at Habsheim, on the Alsace front, on 27 December 1944. Two other leaders died at the same time. This gave rise to various conspiracy rumors. On 31 March 1945 the unit, now commanded by a career officer, was the first French formation to force a Rhine crossing. In the campaign in Germany the unit lost 164 killed and 54 missing.

== Legacy ==
Fabien and his volunteers are celebrated by the Communists, but for many years there was little official recognition of the force's actions. As of 2014 there was no monument in Paris to commemorate the column.

== Sources ==
- Calvès, André (1996). "La Colonne Fabien" (in French).
- Guéraiche, William (1999-01-01). Les femmes et la République: essai sur la répartition du pouvoir de 1943 à 1979 (in French). Editions de l'Atelier. ISBN 978-2-7082-3468-0.
- Pigenet, Michel (1998). "Mémoire officielle, mémoire militante: Le souvenir des morts de la colonne Fabien". Autour des morts (in French). Publication Univ Rouen Havre. p. 419. ISBN 978-2-87775-608-2.
- Pigenet, Michel (5 September 2014). "La colonne Fabien, de la Mutualité à Sigmaringen". L'Humanité.
