= Sévigny-Waleppe =

- Commune
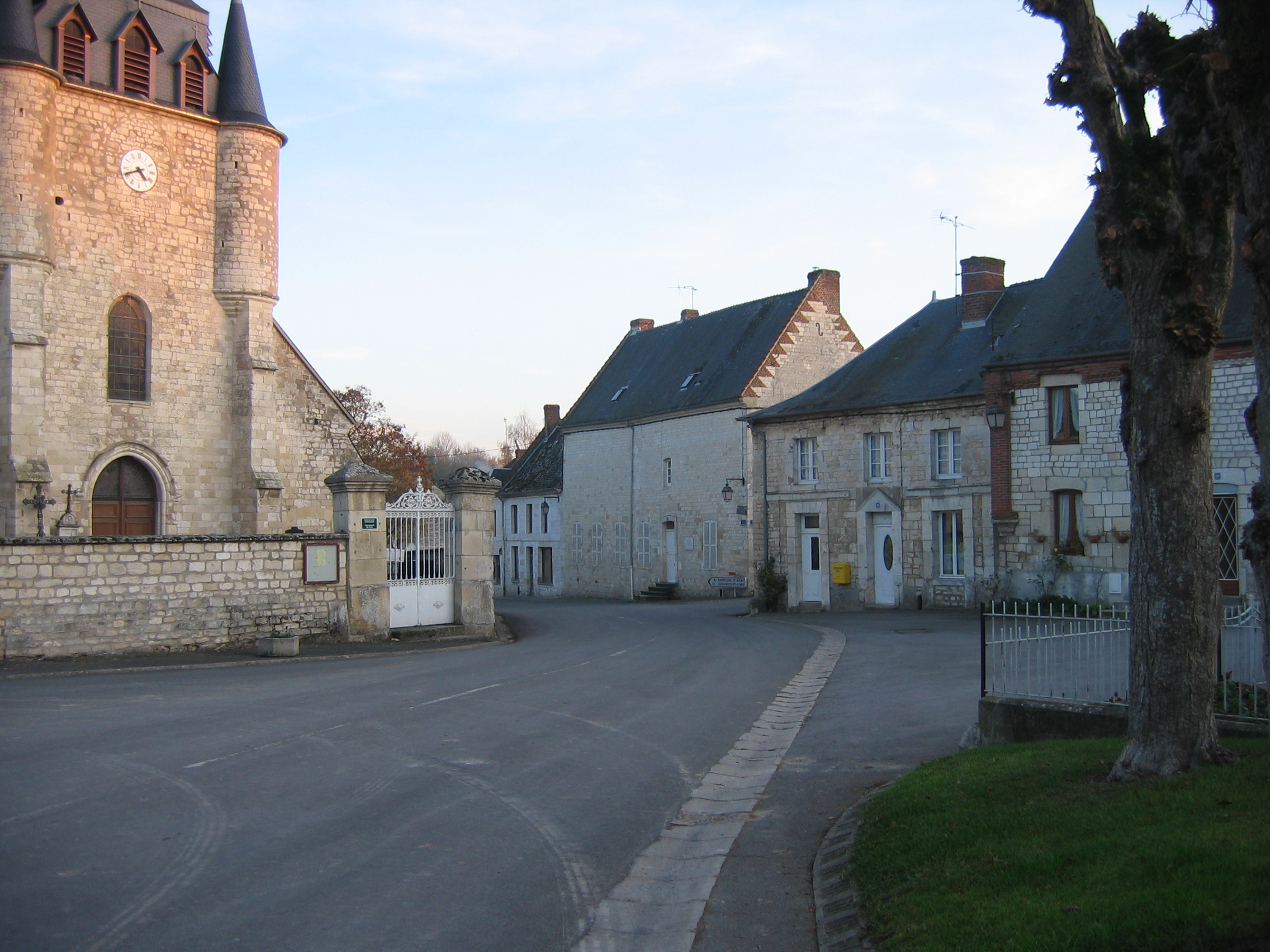
- The centre of Sévigny-Waleppe
- Location of Sévigny-Waleppe
- Location within France Location within Grand Est
- Coordinates: 49°36′18″N 4°04′55″E
- Country: France
- Region: Grand Est
- Department: Ardennes
- Arrondissement: Rethel
- Canton: Château-Porcien

Government
  - Mayor (2020–2026): Eric Guirsch
- Area^{1}: 24.11 km^{2} (9.31 sq mi)
- Elevation: 96 m (315 ft)
- Highest elevation: 155 m (509 ft)
- Lowest elevation: 95 m (312 ft)
- Population (2023): 218
  - Density: 9.04/km^{2} (23.4/sq mi)
- Time zone: UTC+01:00 (CET)
  - Summer (DST): UTC+02:00 (CEST)
- INSEE/Postal code: 08418 /08220
- ^{1} French Land Register data, which excludes lakes, ponds, glaciers > 1 km^{2} (0.386 sq mi or 247 acres) and river estuaries.

Sévigny-Waleppe is a commune in the Ardennes department in northern France.

== Population ==
Historical population
Year	Pop.	±% p.a.
1968	373	—
1975	334	−1.57%
1982	303	−1.38%
1990	269	−1.48%
1999	257	−0.51%
2007	258	+0.05%
2012	247	−0.87%
2017	227	−1.67%
2023	218	−0.67%
Source: INSEE

== See also ==
- Communes of the Ardennes department
