= Pierre Georges =

French resistance member (1919–1944)

- Born: 21 January 1919; Paris, France
- Died: 27 December 1944 (aged 25); Habsheim, France
- Occupation: Resistance leader
- Known for: Colonne Fabien

Pierre Georges (21 January 1919 – 27 December 1944), better known as Colonel Fabien, was one of the two members of the French Communist Party who perpetrated the first assassinations of German personnel during the Nazi Occupation of France in the Second World War.

== Life ==
Pierre Georges was born into a baker's family on 21 January 1919 in Paris. He fought for the Republican side during the Spanish Civil War until the end of the International Brigades in 1939. In 1940, Georges joined the French Resistance in the Francs-Tireurs et Partisans, at the time still largely operating by sabotaging German equipment in France.

On 2 August 1941 Albert Ouzoulias met Danielle Casanova in Montparnasse and was put in charge of the Bataillons de la Jeunesse, fighting groups that were being created by the Jeunesses Communistes (Young Communists or "JC"). He took the name of "Colonel Andre". Pierre Georges was made his second-in-command. The JC were mainly involved in propaganda, publishing tracts and clandestine newspapers, with minimal armed action. At a session on 15–17 August it was agreed that members of the JC should receive weapons training and increase sabotage and attacks on occupation troops. There was some resistance to this approach, but with news of the execution of Samuel Tyszelman and Henri Gautherot it was agreed to take a more active role. Of the JC leaders, Georges became primarily involved in military operations in the Paris region, while Ouzoulias was more concerned with recruitment and liaison between the regions.

On 21 August 1941 Pierre Georges, who then went by the name of Frédo, and his companion Gilbert Brustlein, helped by two other members of the French Resistance shot and killed a German soldier named Alfons Moser when he was boarding a train at the Barbès station at eight in the morning. The killing was in revenge for the execution of Samuel Tyszelman for taking part in an anti-German demonstration. This was the start of a series of assassinations and reprisals that resulted in 500 French hostages being executed in the next few months. In 1943, Georges was captured and tortured but escaped.

Five days after the surrender of Paris, Albert Ouzoulias ("Colonel André") of the national committee of Francs-tireurs et partisans français (FTPF) called a meeting at which Pierre Georges ("Colonel Fabien") was assigned the task of forming a battalion of resistance fighters. Colonel Fabien organized a Free French (FFI: Forces Françaises de l'Intérieur) column that left Paris soon after the uprising in that city early in September 1944. The Colonne Fabien was to form the nucleus of a Free French force in Lorraine, which would be joined by volunteers from Paris and the eastern regions of France as soon as possible. The French state would have to accept the fait accompli of the Free French army fighting on the front, which would become a "great people's army".

Colonel Fabien was killed in a mine explosion at Habsheim, on the Alsace front, on 27 December 1944. Two other leaders died at the same time. This gave rise to various conspiracy rumors.

== Honours ==
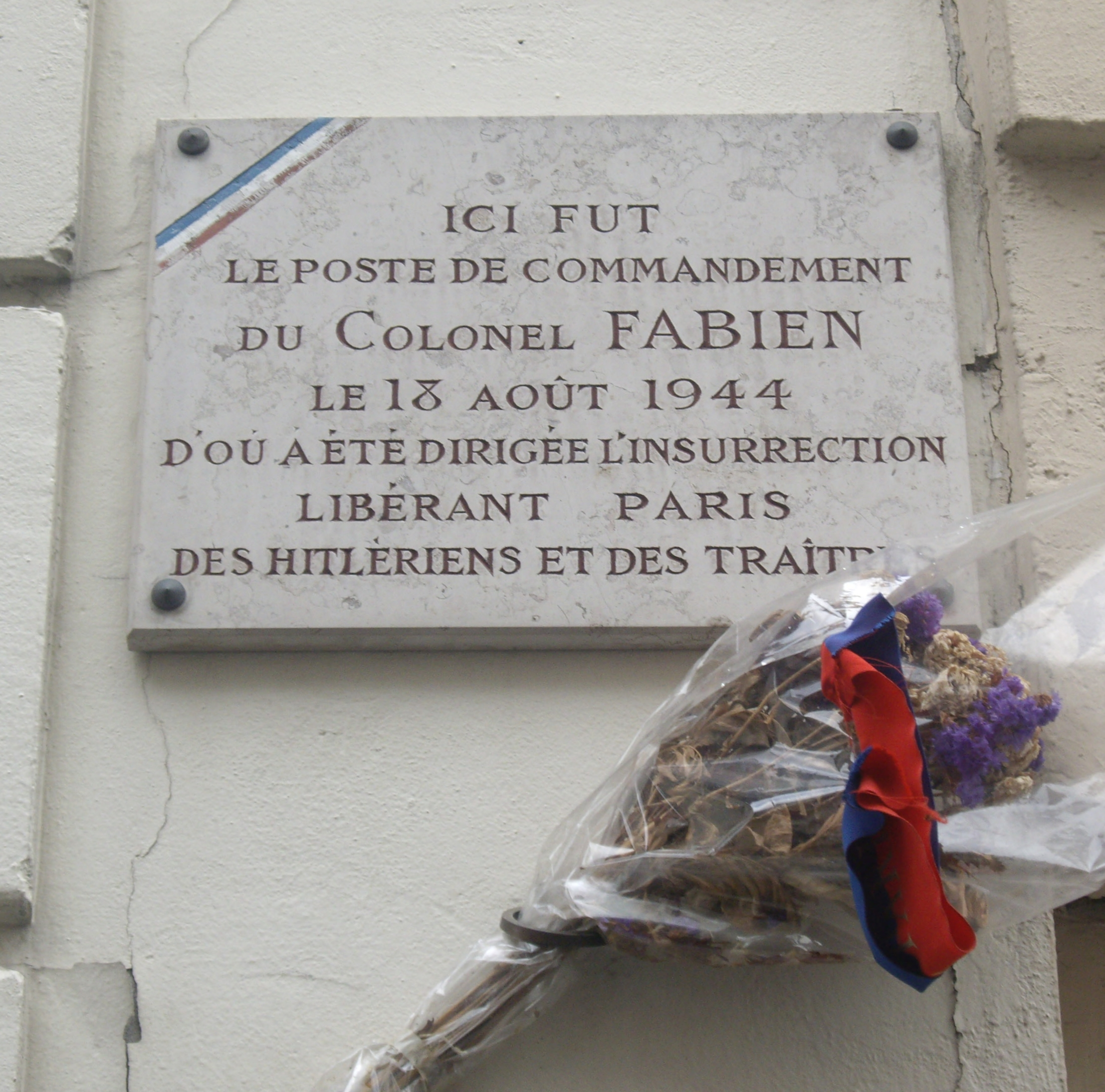
Commemorative plaque at 34 rue Gandon, 13th arrondissement de Paris, marking the command post of Colonel Fabien until the Liberation of Paris

- The former Place du Combat in Paris was renamed Place du Colonel Fabien in honour of Pierre Georges.
- The Paris Métro station Combat was also renamed Colonel Fabien.
- The French Communist Party headquarters, located at the Place du Colonel Fabien, is often so called.

Likewise, many streets in towns with communist mayors are named Colonel Fabien.

== Sources ==
- Calvès, André (1996). "La Colonne Fabien" (in French).
- "Ce jeudi 21 août 1941, 8 heures". L'Humanité. 1994-08-23.
- Hansen, Randall (2014). Disobeying Hitler: German Resistance After Valkyrie. Oxford University Press. p. 31. ISBN 978-0-19-992792-0.
- Johnson, Douglas (6 December 1995). "Obituary: Albert Ouzoulias". The Independent (UK).
- Lallier, Rose; Logak, Elisabeth (2015). "Albert Ouzoulias (1915 – 1995)". Figures humaines. Archived from the original on 2015-06-03.
- Pigenet, Michel (5 September 2014). "La colonne Fabien, de la Mutualité à Sigmaringen". L'Humanité.
- Porin, Axel (2004). "Albert Ouzoulias". La Résistance en Ile-de-France. AERI.
