= Saint-Hymer =

- Commune
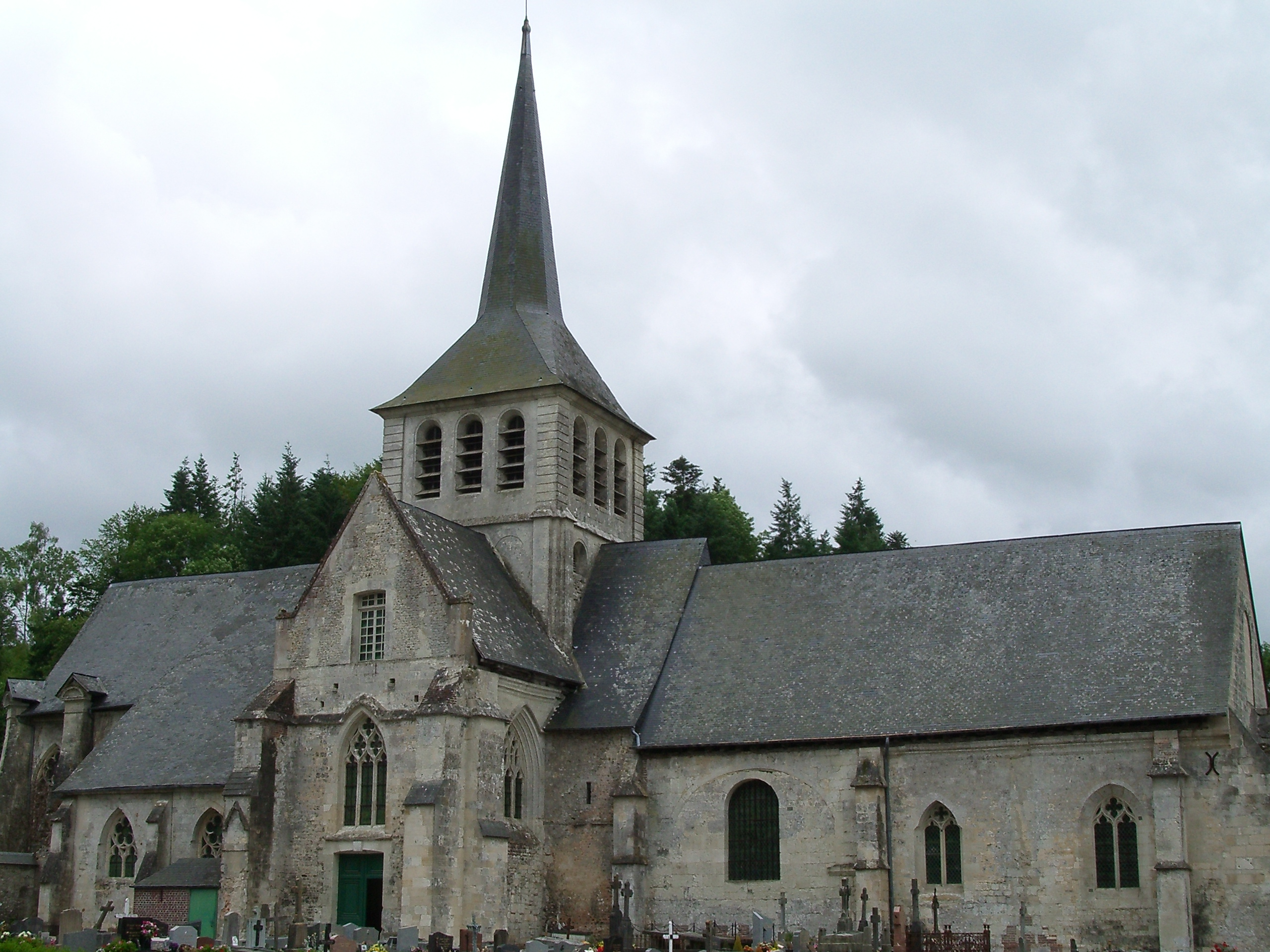
- The church in Saint-Hymer
- Location of Saint-Hymer
- Location within France Location within Normandy
- Coordinates: 49°15′15″N 0°10′27″E
- Country: France
- Region: Normandy
- Department: Calvados
- Arrondissement: Lisieux
- Canton: Pont-l'Évêque
- Intercommunality: CC Terre d'Auge

Government
  - Mayor (2020–2026): Joël Lebrun
- Area^{1}: 12.32 km^{2} (4.76 sq mi)
- Elevation: 75 m (246 ft)
- Highest elevation: 144 m (472 ft)
- Lowest elevation: 20 m (66 ft)
- Population (2023): 656
  - Density: 53.2/km^{2} (138/sq mi)
- Time zone: UTC+01:00 (CET)
  - Summer (DST): UTC+02:00 (CEST)
- INSEE/Postal code: 14593 /14130
- ^{1} French Land Register data, which excludes lakes, ponds, glaciers > 1 km^{2} (0.386 sq mi or 247 acres) and river estuaries.

Saint-Hymer (French pronunciation: [sɛ̃.t‿imɛʁ]) is a commune in the Calvados department in the Normandy region in northwestern France.

== Population ==
Historical population
Year	Pop.	±% p.a.
1968	459	—
1975	458	−0.03%
1982	502	+1.32%
1990	582	+1.87%
1999	663	+1.46%
2007	681	+0.34%
2012	614	−2.05%
2017	664	+1.58%
2023	656	−0.20%
Source: INSEE

== See also ==
- Communes of the Calvados department
