= Joinville-le-Pont =

- Commune
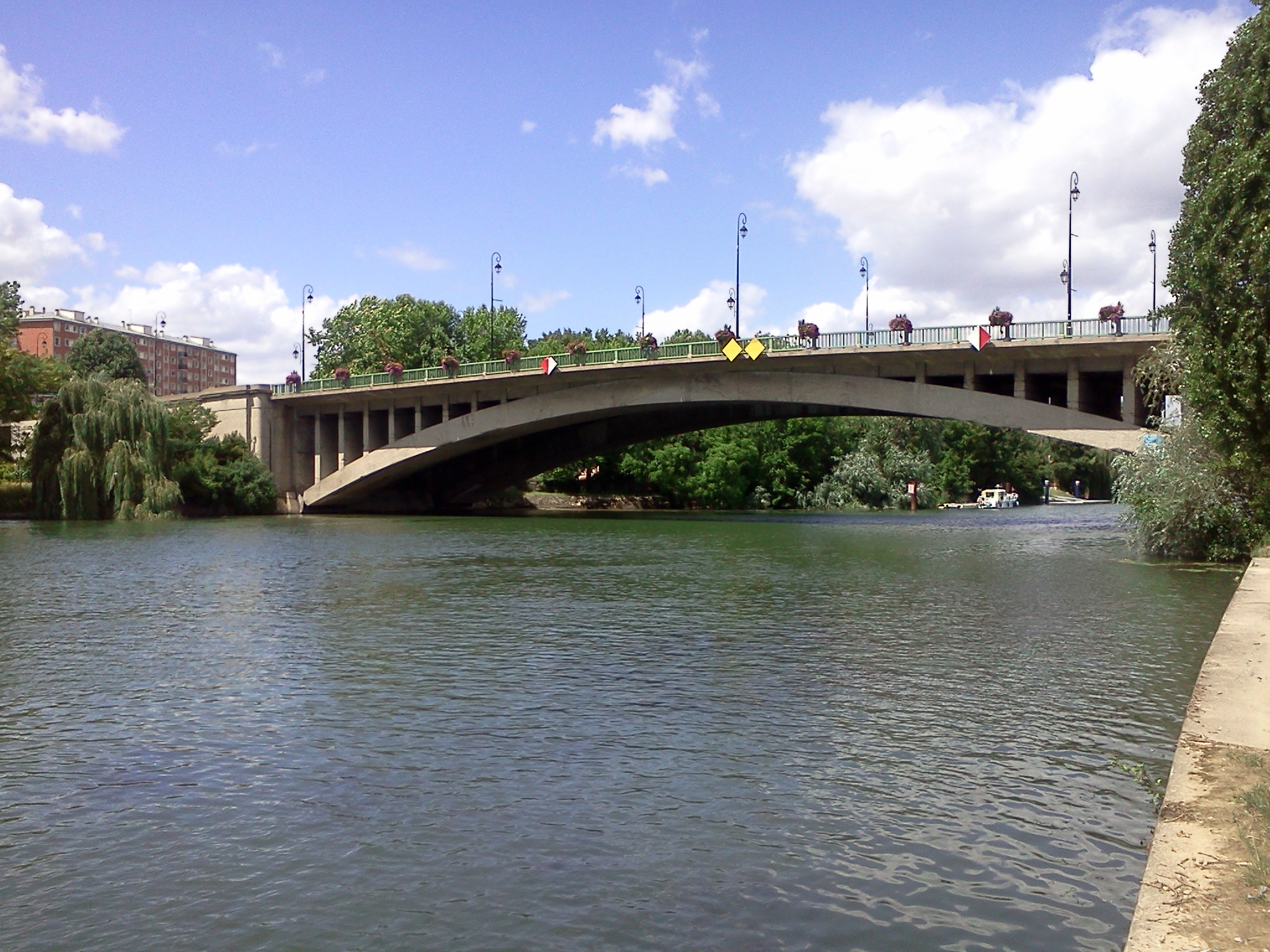
- The bridge of Joinville-le-Pont

- Coat of arms

- Location (in red) within Paris inner suburbs
- Location of Joinville-le-Pont
- Location within France Location within Île-de-France (region)
- Coordinates: 48°49′17″N 2°28′22″E
- Country: France
- Region: Île-de-France
- Department: Val-de-Marne
- Arrondissement: Nogent-sur-Marne
- Canton: Charenton-le-Pont
- Intercommunality: Grand Paris

Government
  - Mayor (2026–32): Francis Sellam
- Area^{1}: 2.42 km^{2} (0.93 sq mi)
- Highest elevation: 61 m (200 ft)
- Lowest elevation: 33 m (108 ft)
- Population (2023): 20,525
  - Density: 8,480/km^{2} (22,000/sq mi)
- Time zone: UTC+01:00 (CET)
  - Summer (DST): UTC+02:00 (CEST)
- INSEE/Postal code: 94042 /94340
- ^{1} French Land Register data, which excludes lakes, ponds, glaciers > 1 km^{2} (0.386 sq mi or 247 acres) and river estuaries.

Joinville-le-Pont (French pronunciation: [ʒwɛ̃vil lə pɔ̃]) is a commune in the southeastern suburbs of Paris, France. It is located 9.4 km (5.8 mi) from the center of Paris.

== History ==
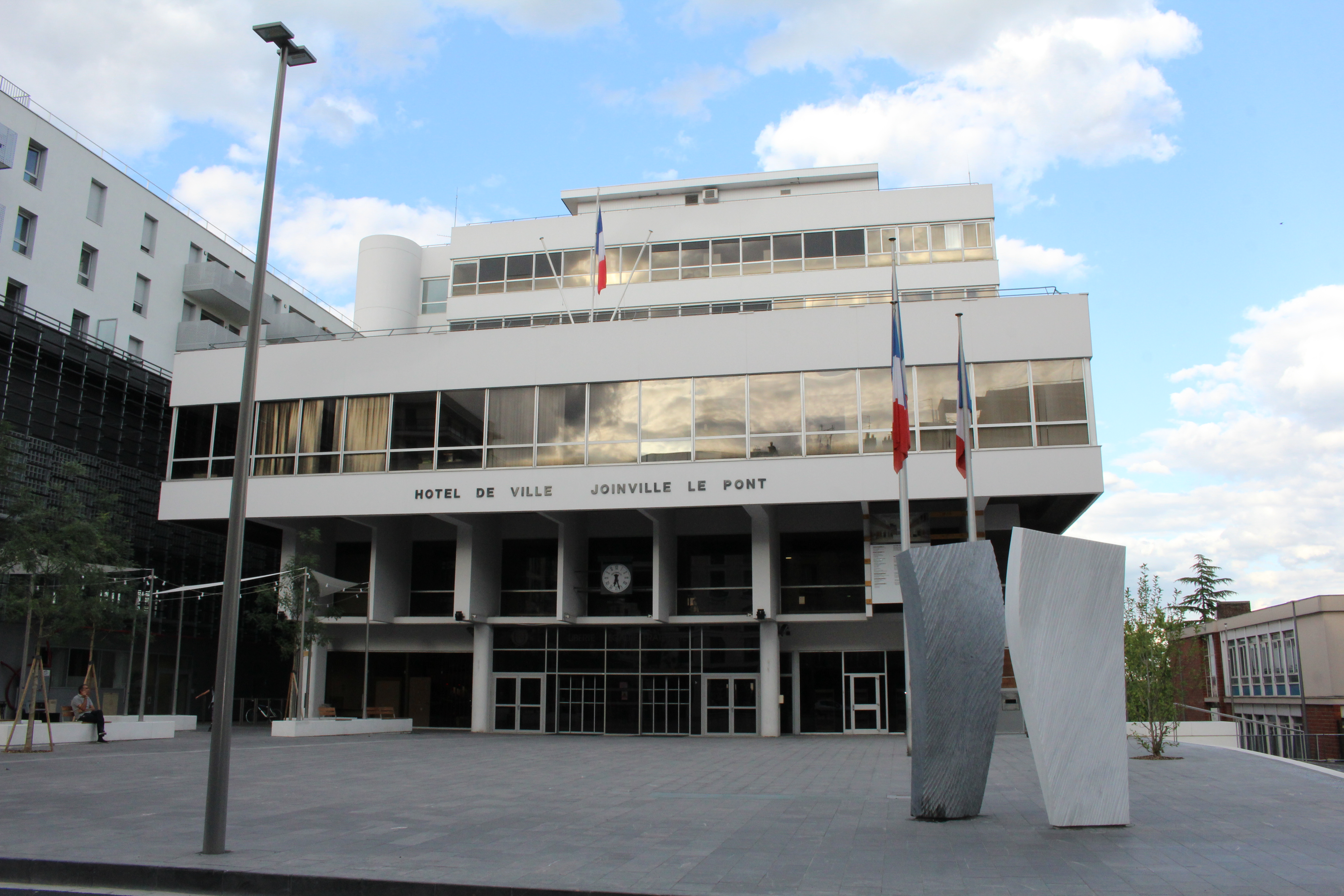
The Hôtel de Ville

The commune was created in 1791 under the name La Branche-du-Pont-de-Saint-Maur (literally "The Branch of Saint-Maur's Bridge") by detaching its territory from the commune of Saint-Maur-des-Fossés. The commune was renamed Joinville-le-Pont (literally "Joinville the Bridge") on 29 August 1831. Under Louis-Philippe of France, the Redoute de Gravelle was built in the commune.

In 1929, the commune of Joinville-le-Pont lost more than a third of its territory when the city of Paris annexed the Bois de Vincennes, a part of which belonged to Joinville-le-Pont.

The Hôtel de Ville was completed in 1976.

== Geography ==
=== Climate ===
Joinville-le-Pont has an oceanic climate (Köppen climate classification Cfb). The average annual temperature in Joinville-le-Pont is 12.9 °C (55.2 °F). The average annual rainfall is 654.0 mm (25.75 in) with December as the wettest month. The temperatures are highest on average in July, at around 21.3 °C (70.3 °F), and lowest in January, at around 5.2 °C (41.4 °F). The highest temperature ever recorded in Joinville-le-Pont was 42.5 °C (108.5 °F) on 25 July 2019; the coldest temperature ever recorded was −15.6 °C (3.9 °F) on 17 January 1985.

Climate data for Joinville-le-Pont (1991−2020 normals, extremes 1981-present)
Month	Jan	Feb	Mar	Apr	May	Jun	Jul	Aug	Sep	Oct	Nov	Dec	Year
Record high °C (°F)	17.3 (63.1)	22.5 (72.5)	27.5 (81.5)	31.0 (87.8)	33.4 (92.1)	38.9 (102.0)	42.5 (108.5)	41.0 (105.8)	35.5 (95.9)	31.0 (87.8)	22.5 (72.5)	17.2 (63.0)	42.5 (108.5)
Mean daily maximum °C (°F)	7.9 (46.2)	9.5 (49.1)	13.7 (56.7)	17.6 (63.7)	21.0 (69.8)	24.3 (75.7)	26.8 (80.2)	26.5 (79.7)	22.5 (72.5)	17.4 (63.3)	11.7 (53.1)	8.1 (46.6)	17.3 (63.1)
Daily mean °C (°F)	5.2 (41.4)	6.0 (42.8)	9.2 (48.6)	12.4 (54.3)	15.8 (60.4)	19.1 (66.4)	21.3 (70.3)	21.1 (70.0)	17.4 (63.3)	13.3 (55.9)	8.7 (47.7)	5.6 (42.1)	12.9 (55.2)
Mean daily minimum °C (°F)	2.5 (36.5)	2.5 (36.5)	4.7 (40.5)	7.1 (44.8)	10.6 (51.1)	13.9 (57.0)	15.8 (60.4)	15.6 (60.1)	12.4 (54.3)	9.3 (48.7)	5.6 (42.1)	3.1 (37.6)	8.6 (47.5)
Record low °C (°F)	−15.6 (3.9)	−12.1 (10.2)	−6.6 (20.1)	−2.5 (27.5)	1.0 (33.8)	4.8 (40.6)	7.5 (45.5)	6.8 (44.2)	4.0 (39.2)	−1.0 (30.2)	−6.8 (19.8)	−9.5 (14.9)	−15.6 (3.9)
Average precipitation mm (inches)	52.0 (2.05)	47.1 (1.85)	46.3 (1.82)	45.4 (1.79)	62.9 (2.48)	54.2 (2.13)	59.1 (2.33)	55.9 (2.20)	49.9 (1.96)	56.2 (2.21)	59.2 (2.33)	65.8 (2.59)	654.0 (25.75)
Average precipitation days (≥ 1.0 mm)	11.7	10.7	10.2	9.2	9.2	9.0	7.7	8.2	7.9	10.2	11.3	12.5	118.0
Source: Météo-France

== Transport ==
Joinville-le-Pont is served by Joinville-le-Pont station on Paris RER line A.

== Population ==
Historical population
Year	Pop.	±% p.a.
1968	17,467	—
1975	17,608	+0.11%
1982	16,934	−0.56%
1990	16,657	−0.21%
1999	17,117	+0.30%
2007	17,303	+0.14%
2012	18,020	+0.82%
2017	19,133	+1.21%
2023	20,525	+1.18%
Source: INSEE

== Education ==
Public schools include:

- Preschools/nurseries (maternelles): Centre, Jean de la Fontaine, Polangis, P’tit Gibus
- Elementaries: Palissy, Parangon, Polangis, and Eugène Voisin
- Junior high schools (collèges): Jean Charcot and Jules Ferry

There is a private school, Groupe Scolaire A.P.E.P., which runs from preschool to senior high school/sixth-form college (lycée).

== See also ==
- Communes of the Val-de-Marne department
