= The Europeans (podcast) =

News podcast

- Genre: News magazine

Cast and voices
- Hosted by: Katy Lee and Dominic Kraemer

Music
- Theme music composed by: Jim Barne

Production
- Length: 40 mins

Publication
- No. of episodes: 337 (as of January 2026)
- Original release: 28 November 2017
- Updates: Weekly

Related
- Website: europeanspodcast.com

The Europeans is a weekly independent podcast focusing on the "often overlooked news items affecting Europe". It is produced and presented by Katy Lee, a journalist based in Paris, and Dominic Kraemer, an opera singer based in Amsterdam.

In May 2018 the podcast was the Dutch national nominee for the European Charlemagne Youth Prize, and in 2019 was a winner of the European Commission's Altiero Spinelli Prize for Outreach, for "works that aimed to enhance young peoples' understanding of the European Union, with a focus on participation in EU democratic processes." Also in 2019, and in the context of that year's European Parliament elections, the podcast received a grant from the European Cultural Foundation to produce the three-part series Bursting the bubble to "explain how the E.U. actually works without boring you to death."

Lee and Kraemer, both originally from England, intended for the show "to make Europe cool again" and consequently it "proudly announces itself [as a] Brexit free zone". Alongside other regular segments, each episode features an interview. Past guests include: Igor Levit, Christoph Niemann, Rokhaya Diallo, Emma Holten, Akbar Ahmed, Patrick Gathara, Jacek Dehnel, Darach Ó Séaghdha, Actress, and Joris Luyendijk.

"We were both British expats, we had a much closer connection to life on the continent than a lot of Brits living on the island, and we wanted to rectify that. We wanted to make a podcast that was going to treat Europe as something that was really interesting and varied, but that could feel very inaccessible to many people because of the way we speak about Europe."

— Katy Lee, 2019

== Episodes ==
Each regular episode features the segments "good week; bad week", "happy ending" and at least one interview. The list of episodes, publication date, interviewee(s) and description of the interview topic are as follows:

=== 2017 ===
No.	Title	Guest(s)	Original release date
1	"Katy smells the money"	Frank Zeller and Ania Jakubek	28 November 2017
German politics and Frida Kahlo in Poland
2	"C'est too much"	Claire Sergent and A Couple of Men	5 December 2017
The French language and gay travel
3	"National Hallydays"	Anousha Nzume and Ania Jakubek	12 December 2017
Zwarte Piet and Polish politics
4	"O Come All Ye Phosphateful"	Jonah Lamers and Ryan Heath	19 December 2017
Trans terminology and "EU-so-white"

=== 2018 ===
No.	Title	Guest(s)	Original release date
5	"The Dumbest Farmer Finds The Biggest Potatoes"	Nina Lamparski and Georgi Gotev	9 January 2018
Luxembourgish and the Bulgarian presidency of the Council of the European Union
6	"Translating Trump, Defending Deneuve"	Franz Kubaczyk, Leonie Wagener and Agnès Poirier	16 January 2018
Translating Trump for German TV and #MeToo in France
7	"Fake snus"	Juliane von Reppert-Bismarck and Christopher Snowdon	23 January 2018
News literacy and snus
8	"Trawlin', Ballin', Fallin'"	Matthias Brandstetter and Pavel Klinckhamers	30 January 2018
Viennese balls and controversial fishing techniques
9	"Build your own Europe, baby"	Sarah Fager and Andrea Venzon	6 February 2018
IKEA designer and political party Volt Europa
10	"Mi kidney, su kidney"	Ania Jakubek and Greg Moorlock	13 February 2018
Polish Holocaust law and organ donation
11	"Olympic gold, Dominic is old, Katy has a cold"	Andrew MacDowall and Oona Kauste	20 February 2018
Kosovan independence and Winter Olympics
12	"Making peace with the wolves"	Alexandra Pascalidou and Max Rossberg	27 February 2018
Neo-Nazis and wolves in Europe
13	"Bonus episode: Alexandra Pascalidou"	Alexandra Pascalidou	1 March 2018
Extended conversation about Europe, forgiveness and Multiculturalism
14	"Don't put salt on every snail"	Eckard Helmers and Marko Modiano	6 March 2018
Diesel cars and the English language
15	"The best place for our little sprouts"	Jennifer Pettersson and Asmund Asdal	16 March 2018
Raising children and the Global Seed Vault
16	"Suzy Menkes and the Beer-Brewing Monks"	Suzy Menkes	20 March 2018
French designer Hubert de Givenchy
17	"French Burgers, Danish Pizza"	Christian Puglisi	27 March 2018
Scandinavian Pizza
18	"Trash islands and rainbow homes"	Naomi O'Leary and Daniel Martinović	3 April 2018
Plastic and Croatian rainbow families
19	"Liberté, Egalité, Difficultés"	Rokhaya Diallo	10 April 2018
Attitudes towards race in France
20	"Once Upon A Time In Hungary"	Zselyke Csaky and Mick ter Reehorst	17 April 2018
Viktor Orbán and Are We Europe
21	"Keep your bitcoin close and your botany closer"	Agata Szafraniuk and Oliver Gee	24 April 2018
Polish primeval forest and Parisian podcasting
22	"Sticks and stones and dandruff"	Wenzel Michalski and Andy Buchanan	1 May 2018
Anti-semitism in Germany and the European Stacking Championships
23	"Eurovision. EUROVISION!!!!!"	Dan Gould and Brigitte Vasallo	8 May 2018
Eurovision and #MeToo in Spain
24	"The winner takes it all, the loser takes a selfie"	Farah Abdi and MaJiKer	15 May 2018
LGBT refugees in Europe and Eurovision songwriting
25	"Hello, new listeners!"	–	19 May 2018
[Updated trailer]
26	"A wedding and no funeral"	Marit Higraff and Kieran Hodgson	22 May 2018
True crime podcasting and making a comedy show about Britain joining the EU
27	"Five Stars, Ireland"	Giuseppe Porcaro and Florian Tirnovan	29 May 2018
EU Sci-Fi and a European talent show for deaf people
28	"Changing PMs at 103 BPMs"	Akbar Ahmed	5 June 2018
Islam in Europe
29	"Bonus episode: Akbar Ahmed on Islam in Europe"	Akbar Ahmed	8 June 2018
Extended conversation about Islam's role in Europe
30	"Waxy smiles"	Aljaž Pengov Bitenc	12 June 2018
Elections in Slovenia
31	"HEAT"	Dicle Akar and Patrick Galey	31 July 2018
Turkish identity in Germany and extreme weather
32	"Piss and Populism"	Adrian Murphy and Timo Lochoki	7 August 2018
Europeana and populism in Europe
33	"The traces they leave"	Deborah Cole	14 August 2018
Collecting memories of elderly Germans
34	"The G-Spot of Europe"	Dimi Dimitrov and Agneta Ladek	21 August 2018
Regulating the internet in Europe and an eye-catching Vilnius tourism campaign
35	"Greece and Fabrice"	Nick Malkoutzis and Fabrice Pothier	28 August 2018
The situation in Greece and cycling through Europe
36	"Nation Branding, Robot Dancing"	Charlotte Bostrom	4 September 2018
Sweden's national branding
37	"The Future Library"	Anne Beate Hovind	11 September 2018
Burying books in the woods
38	"Welcome To Europe, Here Are Four Walls"	Alice Pittini	18 September 2018
Housing for refugees and asylum seekers
39	"WEB OF LIES"	Mikey Stothard and Kyrill Hartog	25 September 2018
A Spanish plagiarism scandal and Are We Europe
40	"Wall, Rocket, Bottle, Horse"	Monique van de Abeel and Alexander Hurst	2 October 2018
Guide horses and Americans in Europe
41	"Macedo, Macedon't"	Emil Atanasovski and Kevin Sachs	9 October 2018
Renaming Macedonia and Netflix in Europe
42	"The Unlucky Passport"	Thana Faroq and Bram Hilkens	16 October 2018
A photography project about passports and European hip hop
43	"Big continent, mini episode"	–	23 October 2018
Bacteria and cathedral thinking
44	"Everyone's free to vote (and wear sunscreen)"	Frank Piplat and Sally Eshun	30 October 2018
The European Parliament and hate speech in Europe
45	"Watching Over The Night Watch"	Taco Dibbits and Marjorie H. Morgan	6 November 2018
Restoring Rembrandt and being black in Europe
46	"The black soldier's lament"	Christian Koller	13 November 2018
African and Asian soldiers who fought for European powers in World War I
47	"Why doesn't Europe have a Silicon Valley?"	Sarah Donnolly and Marton Barcza	20 November 2018
Opening for Louis CK and tech in Europe
48	"Picasso, Poland & Pedagogy"	Juliette Perchais	27 November 2018
Teaching in tough schools
49	"Flavia and the Machine (anniversary episode)"	Andrea Chalupa and Flavia Kleiner	4 December 2018
A Welsh journalist in Ukraine and fighting rightwing populism in Switzerland
50	"Freedom"	Paulita Pappel and Marta Pardavi	11 December 2018
Feminist porn and defending Hungarian rights
51	"The Bee Word"	Joris Luyendijk	18 December 2018
Europe in 2019

=== 2019 ===
No.	Title	Guest(s)	Original release date
52	"It's that damn bear again"	Teemu Roos and Ania Jakubek	22 January 2019
Training Finland in AI and a Polish wartime bear
53	"Kraemer vs Kraemer"	Daniel Kraemer	29 January 2019
Weirdness of the British parliament
54	"Stick it to the grown-ups"	Lilly Platt and Laure Brillaud	5 February 2019
School striking and Golden visas
55	"The skies over Skopje"	Aleksandar Dimishkovski	12 February 2019
The most polluted city in Europe
56	"The most isolated place on Earth"	Meganne Christian	19 February 2019
French-Italian research base in the Antarctic
57	"The brands that Karl built"	Fiachra Gibbons	26 February 2019
The flaws, quirks and legacy of Karl Lagerfeld
58	"They / Them / Theirs"	CN Lester and Mick ter Reehorst	5 March 2019
Transgender rights in Europe and getting the youth vote out #ProveThemWrong
59	"A taste of the nuclear apocalypse"	Julie McDowall	12 March 2019
How Europe prepared for nuclear war
60	"MEGALITHS!!!!"	Bettina Schulz Paulsson	19 March 2019
Unlocking the mystery of megalithic monuments
61	"Political Tinder"	Sebastian Horn	26 March 2019
A project bringing Europeans from across the political spectrum together
62	"Nice One, Slovakia"	Mimi Billing	9 April 2019
Microchipping humans
63	"Disinformation Wars"	Jules Darmanin	16 April 2019
Continent-wide fact-checking
64	"Lyra"	Susan McKay	23 April 2019
The murder of Lyra McKee
65	"Happy Birthday Bauhaus!"	Henry Isaacs and Kurt Overbergh	30 April 2019
Anniversary of Bauhaus and new sounds in Brussels
66	"Bananadrama"	Martyn Poliakoff	7 May 2019
Turning the periodic table upside down
67	"Syria, Kosovo, Brussels and the mountain"	AJ Naddaff and Maxime Caligaro	14 May 2019
Kosovo repatriating ISIS fighters and a crime novel set in Brussels
68	"Special episode: Bursting the Bubble, Part 1"	–	21 May 2019
Special episode explaining what the European Parliament actually does
69	"The wars of the future"	Ulrike Franke	28 May 2019
Drones and 'killer robots'
70	"Who won?"	Caroline de Gruyter	4 June 2019
Unpicking the results of the European elections
71	"Europe needs culture"	André Wilkens	11 June 2019
Why Europeans need to get better at telling their own story
72	"Sarajevo calling"	Aleksandar Brezar	18 June 2019
Bosnian politics
73	"Eldorado"	Kai Maurer	25 June 2019
The cult European soap opera: Eldorado
74	"Notes from Black Europe"	Johny Pitts	2 July 2019
What does it mean to be black in Europe?
75	"Brave and competent women"	Benjamin Roll	9 July 2019
A growing Czech protest movement
76	"Morals and the Mediterranean"	Matteo Villa	16 July 2019
Italian migration and the laws of the sea
77	"When politicians talk about love"	Darren Cunningham	23 July 2019
Electronic opera about politics and love
78	"Portugal's revolutionary drug policy"	Andreia Alves	30 July 2019
Decriminalisation of drugs in Portugal
79	"Hiphopo"	Federico Gobbo	6 August 2019
The internet and Esperanto
80	"Back for your Görlitzening pleasure"	Emily Schultheis	10 September 2019
Politics and Identity in the East of Germany
81	"What the hell is the European Way of Life?"	Alberto Alemanno	17 September 2019
Looking at the first decisions of Ursula von der Leyen
82	"The Tourists of Venice"	Elena Riu	24 September 2019
Venetian residents organising a fightback against overtourism
83	"Podchraoladh"	Darach Ó Séaghdha	1 October 2019
The Irish language
84	"Toxic elements"	Jaciek Dehnel	8 October 2019
LGBT rights in Poland
85	"Invisible ink"	Carme Font Paz	22 October 2019
Remembering the female writers that Europe forgot
86	"A Polish teenage diarist"	Ania Jakubek	29 October 2019
The extraordinary story of Renia Spiegel
87	"Loggerheads"	Gabriel Paun	5 November 2019
Protecting Romanian forests against logging
88	"The Other Europeans"	Orlando Figes	12 November 2019
A cultural history of 19th Century Europe
89	"Postcards from Europe: Herstedvester"	Lene Bech Sillesen	19 November 2019
Special episode exploring a Greenlandic inmates in a Danish maximum-security prison
90	"Europe's colonial past and present"	Elliot Ross	26 November 2019
How the colonial past of Europe continues to affect the present
91	"President of the European what now?"	Tom Moylan	3 December 2019
Special episode explaining the European Commission
92	"What's going on in Malta?"	Ranier Fsadni	10 December 2019
Investigating the murder of Daphne Caruana Galizia
93	"A bar in Budapest"	Gyuri Bihari	17 December 2019
A bar at the centre of the fightback against Hungary's government

=== 2020 ===
No.	Title	Guest(s)	Original release date
94	"A fisherman goes to Brussels"	Katz Laszlo	8 January 2020
Special episode telling the story of a Catalan fisherman influencing European policy
95	"Why are monarchies still a thing in Europe?"	Bob Morris	15 January 2020
European monarchies
96	"Fanya and the Forest"	Fanya Brancovskaja	22 January 2020
a 97-year-old holocaust survivor living in Vilnius
97	"How the hell do you make an EU law?"	Katz Laszlo	5 February 2020
Explaining how the E.U. Single-Use Plastics directive was passed.
98	"What just happened in Ireland?"	Naomi O'Leary	12 February 2020
Irish Election Results
99	"Eurafrica"	Patrick Gathara	19 February 2020
Eurafrica: a forgotten post-war project
100	"Why is Greece's refugee policy such a mess?"	Apostolis Fotiadis	26 February 2020
Migration researcher explains what is going wrong in Greece
101	"The God Lobby"	Quentin Aries	4 March 2020
Religious lobbying in Europe
102	"Long Distance"	Saara Turunen	11 March 2020
Cross-cultural relationships
103	"Consent"	Emma Holten	18 March 2020
Revenge porn
104	"Lakes and dogs"	Kapka Kassabova and Katz Laszlo	25 March 2020
Inner and outer geographies of the Balkans
105	"Absolutely marble-lous"	Dion Bakker and Meganne Christian	1 April 2020
Jelle's Marble Runs and isolation tips
106	"Poll-Land"	Ania Jakubek	15 April 2020
Politics of Poland
107	"Normal and Boring"	Christoph Niemann	22 April 2020
visual essay about Estonia
108	"The Other C-Words"	Esther Goodwin-Brown	29 April 2020
the Circle Economy
109	"Quarantainment"	Noé Debré	6 May 2020
European Parliament
110	"What is Russia doing at the bottom of the sea?"	Thomas Nilsen	13 May 2020
Russian submarine Losharik
111	"Wikipedia's Missing Women"	Rebecca O'Neill	20 May 2020
Women in Red
112	"Guide to a Non-Existent Country"	Giovanni Vale	27 May 2020
Guidebooks about countries that no longer exist
113	"The Great Pull of China"	Tom Wan	3 June 2020
Europe's relationship with China
114	"Why the Black Lives Matter protests are different in Europe"	Quinsy Gario	10 June 2020
Black Lives Matter
115	"Recipes for rebellion"	Albena Shkodrova	17 June 2020
A history of food and cooking in the People's Republic of Bulgaria
116	"Love, bees and brain surgery"	Rafael Loss	24 June 2020
European Solidarity Tracker from European Council on Foreign Relations
117	"The Political Pianist"	Igor Levit	1 July 2020
Racism in Germany and performing during the coronavirus pandemic
118	"George Soros, Explained"	Emily Tamkin	8 July 2020
George Soros
119	"The Summer of Solidarity"	Natalie Nougayrède	15 August 2020
Europe's media landscape
120	"The Chain, part one"	Andreea Sirbu, Thomas van Neerbos, and Veronica Tosetti	6 August 2020
What Europeans love about each other's countries
121	"The Chain, part two"	Julie Lindahl, Sedera Ranaivoarinosy, and Marta Santiváñez	14 August 2020
What Europeans love about each other's countries
122	"The Chain, part three"	Philip Pollak, Viola Theunissen, and Nina Lamparski	19 August 2020
What Europeans love about each other's countries
123	"Italy's past, Europe's future"	Francesca Melandri	9 September 2020
Europe and Italy
124	"The women of Belarus"	Hanna Liubakova	16 September 2020
Belarus protest movement
125	"Make Europe Romantic Again"	Simon Strauß	23 September 2020
Stories of Europe
126	"Poison, puffins and the people's game"	Eniola Aluko	30 September 2020
Being a woman in European football
127	"The oat milk question"	Fredrik Gertten	7 October 2020
Oatly and Blackstone
128	"The One Where We Interview A Prime Minister"	Aava Murto	14 October 2020
16-year-old becomes Finland's PM for a day
129	"The House of Many Languages"	Alexander Drechsel	21 October 2020
Euro English
130	"A war on the edge of Europe"	Arzu Geybulla	28 October 2020
Nagorno-Karabakh
131	"A non-election podcast"	Nikolay Staykov	4 November 2020
Corruption in Bulgaria
132	"A hot mess of an airport"	Jöran Mandik	11 November 2020
Berlin's Brandenburg Airport
133	"France's Invisible Asians"	Grace Ly	18 November 2020
Food and Racism in France
134	"A country of dreamers"	Aliona Rotaru	25 November 2020
Exodus from Moldova
135	"An unsung hero"	Ola Cichowlas	2 December 2020
Story of Janina Garbień
136	"Philip and Laci"	Philip Pollak	9 December 2020
Conversation with a classmate who is a member of a far-right group
137	"'Twas Christmas Eve in Dublin"	Richy Craven and Darach Ó Séaghdha	16 December 2020
Christmas story from Marks and Spencer

=== 2021 ===
No.	Title	Guest(s)	Original release date
138	"Life after Merkel"	Wolfgang Munchau	13 January 2021
Germany after Merkel
139	"The mafia on trial"	Federico Varese	20 January 2021
'Ndrangheta maxi-trial
140	"The Shell Case"	Anoek Nuyens	27 January 2021
Climate Justice in the Netherlands
141	"Taming Big Tech"	Andrii Degeler	3 February 2021
EU regulating the internet
142	"The weird and wonderful world of eels"	Patrik Svensson	10 February 2021
The Gospel of the Eels
143	"Decolonising Kitchens"	Asma Khan	17 February 2021
Border-crossing food
144	"A polyphonic episode"	Timothy Garton Ash	24 February 2021
Europe's Stories
145	"Poland's abortion fight"	Marta Lempart	11 March 2021
All-Poland Women's Strike
146	"Headscarves & Eurovision"	Inès El-Shikh	18 March 2021
Referendum on face-coverings in Switzerland
147	"The Great Reverse Migration"	Ognyan Georgiev	25 March 2021
Reverse migration during the pandemic
148	"The power of Romanian teenagers"	Sofia Scarlat	1 April 2021
Girl Up Romania
149	"Trains!"	Lorenzo Ferrari	8 April 2021
European rail connections
150	"The Northern Ireland Knowledge Gap"	Tim Mc Inerney	15 April 2021
Riots in Northern Ireland
151	"Realo Greens and Fake Palm Trees"	Joanna Rajkowska	22 April 2021
A Palm Tree in Warsaw
152	"Cheese Diplomacy"	Natalie Lamprou	29 April 2021
Halloumi awarded Protected Designation of Origin
153	"Unravelling a Scandal"	Răzvan Luțac	16 May 2021
Corruption in Romania as featured in Collective (2019 film)
154	"The bear, the prince and the streaming giant"	Jérôme Dechesne	13 May 2021
Is Netflix creating a shared culture in the EU?
155	"Inventing an Alphabet"	Maria Doreuli and Krista Radoeva	20 May 2021
A celebration of Cyrillic writing
156	"Josh and Franco"	Giosuè Prezioso	27 May 2021
Father and son coming of age
157	"Thinker, Plaintiff, Merkel, Spy"	George Blaustein and Sander Pleij	3 June 2021
Creating a European Review of Books
158	"The best rainy city in the world"	Jens Thoms Ivarsson	10 June 2021
Rain Gothernburg
159	"The plastics law, revisited"	Katz Laszlo	17 June 2021
"How the hell do you make an EU law?"
160	"The women who built Europe"	Mary Fitzgerald and Francesca Cavallo	24 June 2021
"How the hell do you make an EU law?"
161	"Denisa"	Denisa	1 July 2021
Freedom of movement in action
162	"Bread Week"	Apollonia Poilâne	8 July 2021
Secrets of sourdough
163	"Europe's next illiberal democracy?"	Aljaž Pengov Bitenc	15 July 2021
State of democracy in Slovenia
164	"Is Friday the new Saturday"	Pedro Gomes	9 September 2021
The four day week
165	"The Belarus solidarity algorithm"	Hanna Komar	16 September 2021
Solidarity among women in Belarus
166	"Submarines and rainbow families"	Beatriz Ríos	23 September 2021
Ursula von der Leyen's State of the Union
167	"The last 250 years of Amsterdam – Live at the Tolhuistuin"	Thomas Lamers	28 September 2021
Reflecting on the end of Amsterdam
168	"The château, the walrus and the rogue Danish artist"	Arndt Leininger	7 October 2021
German election
169	"What the hell just happened in Poland?"	Jakub Jaraczewski	14 October 2021
Poland's Constitutional Court
170	"Will Europe's climate policy save us all?"	Emily Stewart	21 October 2021
Fit for 55?
171	"Sara"	Sara	4 November 2021
Trahana
172	"Trapped at the EU border"	Marta Górczyńska	11 November 2021
Humanitarian crisis on Poland/Belarus border
173	"Pushbacks"	Andrei Popoviciu	18 November 2021
Accusations of pushbacks on the border of Europe
174	"Move Fast and Fix Things"	Guillermo Beltrà	25 November 2021
EU's plan to rein in the tech giants
175	"The Subtle Art of Subtitling"	Max Deryagin	2 December 2021
Subtitling on streaming services
176	"The life of a reindeer herder"	Jannie Staffansson	9 December 2021
Sámi people herding reindeer
177	"The Europeans' Christmas Party!"	Wojciech Oleksiak and Katz Laszlo	16 December 2021
European Christmas traditions

=== 2022 ===
No.	Title	Guest(s)	Original release date
178	"Energy bills, bills, bills"	Marine Cornelis	20 January 2022
Rising energy bills
179	"Malta's abortion taboo"	Liza Caruana-Finkel	27 January 2022
Malta's strict abortion ban.
180	"The Case for Colour"	Taryn de Vere	3 February 2022
Object Dress Challenge
181	"A Whale of a Taxonomy"	Emma Ursich	10 February 2022
Revamping the Procuratie Vecchie
182	"WTF, housing market?"	Cody Hochstenbach	17 February 2022
Europe's housing crisis
183	"Let Them Entertain Us"	Elise Phamgia and Janine Cathrein	24 February 2022
Live Music Industry Europe
184	"Army Boots"	Olesya Khromeychuk	2 March 2022
The human cost of war in Ukraine
185	"Voice notes from Ukraine"	Multiple	14 March 2022
Voice notes from Ukrainians
186	"Finnish Lessons"	Pasi Sahlberg	7 April 2022
Public education in Finland
187	"Katy went to Le Pen's party so you didn't have to"	Katy Lee	12 April 2022
French Presidential Election
188	"Can the EU fix fast fashion?"	Nimue Smit	21 April 2022
EU fast fashion legislation
189	"Mohamed"	Mohamed	28 April 2022
Life as an undoocmented person in Amsterdam
190	"Doctor Eurovision"	Dr Dean Vuletic	5 May 2022
Eurovision preview
191	"Solar-Powered Scrolling"	Kris de Decker	12 May 2022
Solar-powered magazine
192	"Moldova's Propaganda Problem"	Diana Filimon	26 May 2022
Propaganda in Moldova
193	"Hanna"	Hanna Komar	2 June 2022
A story about the meaning of freedom
194	"What is Orbán playing at?"	Viktória Serdült	9 June 2022
Negotiating EU sanctions against Russia
195	"It takes more than two, baby"	Remco Yizhak Cooremans	16 June 2022
Multi-parenting families
196	"Your Face Looks Familiar"	Domen Savič	30 June 2022
Facial recognition technology
197	"The bigger the better?"	Dr. Ilke Toygür	7 July 2022
EU enlargement
198	"Farmers, fossils and files"	Janez Potočnik	14 July 2022
Global food crisis
199	"Bad laws and feta wars"	Una Hajdari and Gregory Warner	21 July 2022
North Macedonia and Rough Translation
200	"Episode 200! Sweden's elections and a guy who used to run a country"	Alexander Stubb	15 September 2022
Europe's current and future leaders
201	"The joys of the early internet"	Marie Le Conte	22 September 2022
The generation that grew up alongside the internet
202	"What the hell just happened in Italy?"	Lorenzo Marsili	29 September 2022
Italian election result analysis
203	"Golden passports, anal beads, and the world's most complicated elections"	Aleksandar Brezar	6 October 2022
Bosnia and Herzegovina election result analysis
204	"Hacked by Hungary"	Szabolcs Panyi	13 October 2022
Pegasus spyware
205	"Kinga"	Kinga	20 October 2022
A story from an isolated corner of Georgia
206	"The one where we take over the European Parliament"	Roberta Metsola and Silja Markkula	3 November 2022
A youth activism bootcamp in Brussels
207	"Take your time in Barcelona"	Ariadna Güell Sans	10 November 2022
Policies to give citizens their time back
208	"Fleeing climate change"	Alexandre Porteret and François Gemenne	17 November 2022
COP27 in Egypt
209	"Good Five Years, Bad Five Years"	Wojciech Oleksiak and Katz Laszlo	24 November 2022
Marking five years of the podcast
210	"Is China trying to police people in Europe?"	Yuan Yang	1 December 2022
Chinese 'police service stations' operating in Europe
211	"The Surprising Queer History of Poland"	Kamil Karczewski	8 December 2022
History of LGBTQ rights in Poland
212	"Merry Christmas And A Penis Morning To You"	Kathrin Schwarz	15 December 2022
Getting into the festive spirit in the final episode of 2022
