= Holten (surname) =

Holten is a surname. Notable people with the surname include:

- Anne Holten, Norwegian wrestler
- Anthony Holten (1945-2020), Irish author
- Bo Holten (born 1948), Danish composer and conductor
- Dries Holten (1936–2020), Dutch singer
- Emma Holten (born 1991), Danish feminist
- Hans Holten (1892–1973), Norwegian newspaper editor
- John Holten, Irish artist, writer and curator
- Kasper Holten (born 1973), Danish stage director
- Katie Holten (born 1975), Irish artist
- Mac Holten (1922–1996), Australian footballer
- Nicolai Abraham Holten (1775–1850), Danish banker and civil servant
- Odd Holten (born 1940), Norwegian politician
- Rasmus Holten (born 2005), Norwegian footballer
- Samuel Holten (1738–1816), American physician and politician
- Sophie Holten (1858–1930), Danish painter
- Suzette Holten (1863–1937), Danish painter and ceramist
- Val Holten (1927–2015), Australian cricketer
