= Mari Velsand =

Norwegian journalist

Mari Velsand (born 1968) is a Norwegian government official and journalist, and the current director of the Norwegian Media Authority.

== Career ==
Velsand graduated in journalism at the Norwegian Journalist College in 1992, studied Spanish at the Universidad Complutense de Madrid and earned a master's degree from BI Norwegian Business School in 2011. She worked as a journalist with Oppland Arbeiderblad and as a journalist and manager with the Norwegian Broadcasting Corporation, as editor-in-chief of Nationen from 2008 to 2013 and as CEO of Tun Media from 2012 from 2013. From 2014 to 2017 she was a director at Amedia. In 2017 she was appointed by the Norwegian government as the director of the Norwegian Media Authority, succeeding Tom Thoresen.

Preceded by Tom Thoresen	Director of the Norwegian Media Authority; 2017–	Incumbent
