= Coronation of King George VI, London, England =

Photograph by Henri Cartier-Bresson

Coronation of King George VI, London, England is a black and white photograph taken by French photographer Henri Cartier-Bresson, in 1937. Cartier-Bresson covered the coronation of King George VI, in London, on 12 May 1937, for the French Communist weekly Regards, focusing more on the people who were attending the official procession than in the event itself.

== History and description ==
This photograph became one of the most famous of the series that he took while focusing on the people who were attending the procession. Many people had waited all night to see the event, and Cartier-Bresson in this picture shows a glimpse of the awaiting crowd on the steps of Trafalgar Square. Six people, two women and one man, at the left, and three men, at the right, with a small space between the two groups, are seated, while clearly expectant for the procession to come. A larger quantity of people are standing, some of them looking to the right, in the direction where the procession would come. A child with a cap stands between the two groups of seated people, looking at the camera. Looking down, there is a man who seems to have fallen asleep on a large pile of newspapers and litter lying in the ground. Cartier-Bresson explained: "People had waited all night in Trafalgar Square in order not to miss any part of the coronation ceremony of George VI... The next morning, one who was wearier than the others, had not yet wakened to see the ceremony for which he had kept such a late vigil."

== Public collections ==
There are prints of the photograph at the J. Paul Getty Museum, in Los Angeles, the Princeton University Art Museum, in Princeton, and the Museum of Fine Arts, in Houston.

== See also ==
- Coronation of George VI and Elizabeth
