= Regard =

Regard may refer to:

- Regard (DJ), Kosovan musician
- Regards, monthly French Communist news magazine
- Regard (stylized as REGARD), Canadian film festival
- "Regard", 1990 song by Barre Phillips
