= Press support =

Government subsidies of newspapers

Press support is a government subsidy available for newspapers in some countries. The support can either be direct, in terms of money to the newspaper, or indirect, such as lowered or eliminated sales tax. The justification for press support is typically to maintain some level of diversity in the media market.

== Press support by country ==
=== Norway ===
In Norway, press support is a state subsidy available for newspapers. The subsidy is twofold; the first part is a direct subsidy of the second-largest, by circulation, newspapers in each city. The other subsidy is that newspapers are subject to no sales tax (as are books).

==== Direct support ====
The direct subsidy is managed by the Norwegian Media Authority and totalled NOK 303 million in 2006, which was paid to 138 newspapers. It was introduced in 1965 because of the fear of a massive newspaper death like Sweden and Denmark had seen, mainly the second-largest newspapers in each city. Also, at the time, most newspapers were not politically neutral, with many papers being controlled by either conservative forces, the labour movement or political parties. Support is given to all newspapers except those with the largest circulation in the respective city of publishing. There are limitations on the newspapers that can receive support, including that the support will cease if they pay a dividend to their owners. Other support is given to media research, follow-up studies, Sámi newspapers, immigrant publications and distribution support for Finnmark.

The press support has been partially successful, with a number of second-largest newspapers surviving, like Bergensavisen (Bergen), Rogalands Avis (Stavanger) and Dagsavisen (Oslo). Other secondary newspapers have been closed, like Trondheims-Pressen. The largest receivers are often national newspapers, targeting special (often political) sectors, like Klassekampen (Socialist), Nationen (Agrarian) and Vårt Land (Christian). Most of the large business and tabloid newspapers, like Dagbladet or Dagens Næringsliv, do not receive support since they pay dividends to their owners.

Papers that receive the most support
×	Paper	2005	2003
1	Dagsavisen	40 992 576	39 851 052
2	Bergensavisen	32 256 115	27 596 098
3	Vårt Land	31 683 024	31 238 520
4	Nationen	23 094 731	23 122 393
5	Klassekampen	14 513 041	13 068 764
6	Rogalands Avis	13 280 816	13 096 528

==== Indirect support ====
By far the greatest level of support to newspapers comes from their exemption from sales tax and exceeds NOK 1 billion. This exemption was instituted to foster a variety of perspectives from newspapers, to stimulate public debate and consciousness, democracy and freedom of speech and to enable the media to act as society's watchdog.

Indirect press support
×	Paper	Direct support	Indirect support	Sum
1	VG	0	215 000 000	215 000 000
2	Aftenposten	0	126 000 000	126 000 000
3	Dagbladet	0	121 000 000	121 000 000
4	Dagens Næringsliv	0	43 000 000	43 000 000
5	Dagsavisen	29 000 000	14 000 000	43 000 000
6	Bergens Tidende	0	42 000 000	42 000 000
7	Adresseavisen	0	37 000 000	37 000 000
8	Bergensavisen	20 000 000	14 000 000	34 000 000
9	Vårt Land	18 000 000	12 000 000	30 000 000
10	Stavanger Aftenblad	0	29 000 000	29 000 000
	Sum	67 000 000	653 000 000	720 000 000
