= Bondebladet =

Bondebladet may refer to:

- Bondebladet (newspaper), published from 1914 to 1935.
- Bondebladet (weekly), published currently.
