= Velsand =

Velsand is a surname. Notable people with the surname include:

- Lars Velsand (born 1941), Norwegian politician
- Mari Velsand (born 1968), Norwegian government official
