= Hanna Liubakova =

Belarusian journalist and researcher

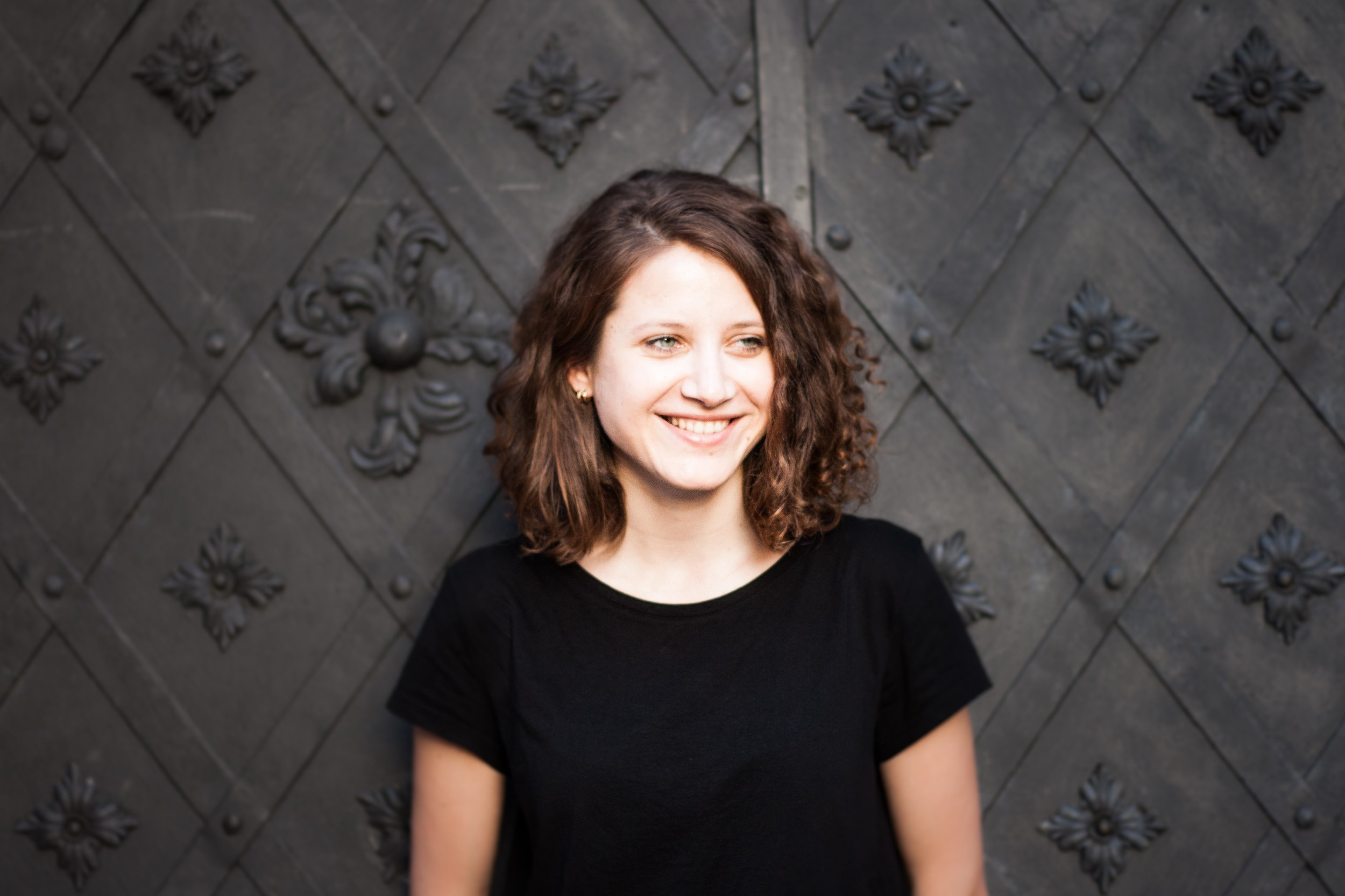
- Education: Jagiellonian University; Brunel University
- Occupations: researcher, journalist, activist, television presenter, correspondent and writer

Hanna Liubakova is a Belarusian journalist, researcher, television presenter, writer and activist. She is a non-resident fellow at the Atlantic Council. She is regarded as one of the prominent independent journalists from Belarus. She was one of the Belarusian independent journalists to have been forced to flee Belarus by the officials for raising concerns against the dictatorship of Alexander Lukashenko.

== Career ==
Liubakova pursued her higher education in art history from the Jagiellonian University in 2010 and obtained her Master of Arts degree in international journalism in 2017 from the Brunel University. She pursued her career initiatlly as a correspondent as well as a presenter at Belsat, an independent television channel operates in Belarus. During her tenure at Belsat, she hosted news programme titled In Focus and also covered international events such as 2016 Warsaw summit, Cannes Film Festival and 2013 EaP Summit.

She was admitted to Václav Havel Journalism Fellowship at the Radio Free Europe in 2014/15 and was also a recipient of the World Press Institute Fellowship in 2019. Hanna covered journalism in various countries such as Poland, France, UK and Belgium in addition to her work in her native country Belarus. She has also written for various international outlets and publications. She also works as a mentor and trainer in the Transitions Solutions Journalism Programme in CEE. She has written about the latest and recent developments in Belarus to The Economist, The Washington Post and Open Democracy.

She previously worked with Outriders which is an international multimedia journalism platform which generates in-depth analysis reports. On 16 September 2020, she appeared as a guest in a weekly podcast The Europeans and shared her views and opinions in response to the 2020–2021 Belarusian protests under the heading "The women of Belarus".

== Awards ==
Liubakova was conferred with the Peter Caws Prize for the best postgraduate dissertation. She was shortlisted as one of the recipients for the 2021 European Press Prize.

Liubakova is a recipient of the Washington DC based Transatlantic Leadership Network "Freedom of the Media" award for excellence in next generation journalism reporting.
