= Tun Media =

Norwegian media group

- Type: Private
- Industry: Mass media
- Founded: 2000
- Headquarters: Oslo, Norway
- Area served: Norway
- Key people: Mads Yngve Storvik (CEO)
- Products: Nationen; Bondebladet; Norsk Landbruk; Traktor
- Revenue: 143 million kr (2020)
- Operating income: NOK 2,9 million (2014)
- Number of employees: 60
- Parent: Amedia
- Website: tunmedia.no

Tun Media AS is a Norwegian media group that publishes the daily newspaper Nationen, the weekly newspaper Bondebladet and the magazines Traktor and Norsk Landbruk.

The group was established in 2000 after a merger between Landbruksforlaget, Bondebladet and Nationen. It is based in Oslo and the largest owners are Tine (25%), the Norwegian Agrarian Association (25%), Nortura (22,5%) and Landkreditt (8%). The remaining percents are owned by about 800 individuals. Felleskjøpet was later a significant owner.

In June 2021, a deal was announced, whereby Tine, Nortura, Felleskjøpet and Landkreditt announced that they would sells their shares in the company. Buyers were the media group Amedia, who would then secure a 66.9-percent ownership stake, and 8 percent by Nord-Trøndelag, a Steinkjer-based media holding company who otherwise is the controlling company of Trønder-Avisa. The Agrarian Association retained its 25 percent ownership share. The process followed an internal analysis which concluded with that Tun Media needed to join forces with one of the large media conglomerates in the country.
