= Landkreditt Bank =

Norwegian agricultural bank

Landkreditt Bank AS
- Type: Subsidiary
- Industry: Financial services
- Founded: 2002
- Headquarters: Oslo, Norway
- Area served: Norway
- Key people: Ola Jordhøy (CEO)
- Operating income: 6 million kr (2006)
- Number of employees: 42 (2007)
- Parent: Landkreditt
- Website: www.landkredittbank.no

Landkreditt Bank AS is a Norwegian commercial bank aimed explicitly at the agricultural sector. The bank only offers its products online, and has no branch offices. It is owned by one of 13 agricultural cooperatives in Norway, Landkreditt. Total equity is NOK 4.6 billion.

Traditionally Landkreditt only offered credit to the agricultural sector, but since 2002 the company has also expanded into other financial services like insurance, mutual funds and mortgages. The owning company is the cooperative Landkreditt BA while the banking itself is performed by Landkreditt Bank AS.
