= Dominique Laffin =

French actress (1952-1985)

- Born: 3 June 1952; Saint-Mandé, Val-de-Marne, France
- Died: 12 June 1985 (aged 33); Paris, France
- Resting place: Cimetière de Montmartre
- Occupation: Actress
- Years active: 1977–1985
- Spouse: Yvan Dautin

Dominique Laffin (3 June 1952 in Saint-Mandé, Val-de-Marne, France – 12 June 1985 in Paris) was a French actress who appeared in 19 films between 1975 and 1985.

Laffin made her major film debut in 1977, gaining critical acclaim for her role in Jacques Doillon's 1979 film, La Femme qui pleure. For her performance, she was nominated for the César Award for Best Actress. That same year, she co-starred with a young Roberto Benigni in the film Chiedo asilo.

Her career was cut short at the age of 33 by a massive heart attack. Her daughter later said that she believed Laffin had committed suicide, but says that she has not been able to confirm this either way. During her short career, Laffin appeared with many of France's rising young stars, including Gérard Depardieu, Juliette Binoche and Miou-Miou, and established stars such as Yves Montand.

Laffin is buried near the renowned director François Truffaut in the Cimetière de Montmartre in the Montmartre Quarter of Paris.

Her daughter, the French politician Clémentine Autain, was born in 1973.

== Partial filmography ==
- Le pied!.. (1975)
- Dites-lui que je l'aime (This Sweet Sickness) (1977) - Lise
- La Nuit, tous les chats sont gris (At Night, All Cats Are Grey) (1977) - La vendeuse
- Les petits câlins (The Little Wheedlers)(1978) - Sophie
- Les Seize ans de Jérémy Millet (1978, short)
- The Crying Woman (1979) - Dominique
- Félicité (1979) - Dominique
- Tapage nocturne (Nocturnal Uproar) (1979) - Solange
- Chiedo asilo (Seeking Asylum) (1979) - Isabella
- L' Oeil du maître (His Master's Eye) (1980) - Hélène
- L'Empreinte des géants (The Imprint of Giants) (1980) - Lucie Dromner
- Vive la mariée (1980, short)
- Instinct de femme (1981) - Marthe
- La meute (1981, TV movie) - Rose
- La Tribu des vieux enfants (1982, TV movie) - Flore
- Room Service (1982, short)
- Liberty Belle (Liberty Belle) (1983) - Elise
- System ohne Schatten (Closed Circuit) (1983) - Juliet
- Garçon! (Waiter!) (1983) - Coline
- Le Cri du printemps (1983, Short)
- Akropolis Now (1984) - Camille
- Passage secret (1985) - Anita (final film role)
