= The Little Wheedlers =

- Directed by: Jean-Marie Poiré
- Written by: Jean-Marie Poiré
- Produced by: Alain Poiré; Yves Robert
- Starring: Josiane Balasko; Dominique Laffin; Caroline Cartier
- Cinematography: Edmond Séchan
- Edited by: Marie-Josèphe Yoyotte
- Music by: Martin Dune; Golden Earing; Bryan Ferry; Roxy Music
- Distributed by: Gaumont Distribution
- Release date: 25 January 1978
- Running time: 96 minutes
- Language: French
- Box office: $3.6 million

The Little Wheedlers (or Les petits câlins) is a French comedy film directed by Jean-Marie Poiré.

== Plot ==
The Little Wheedlers tells the story of three Parisian friends who live in the same dwelling. The first (Sylvie) is Salesmen clothing market, the second (Corinne) works in a university restaurant and the third (Sophie) is unemployed. The latter moves large displacement motorcycle.

== Cast ==
- Josiane Balasko as Corinne
- Dominique Laffin as Sophie
- Caroline Cartier as Sylvie
- Roger Miremont as Antoine
- Jacques Frantz as Marc
- Patrick Cartié as Jean-Pierre
- Claire Maurier as Sophie's mother
- Jean Bouise as Sophie's father
- Françoise Bertin as Antoine's mother
- Jacques Maury as Margeron
- Marc Eyraud as The bookseller
- Marie Déa as The paper
- Gérard Jugnot

== Themes ==
The film depicts the emancipation of women at the end of the 1970s. The radio advertisement during the theatrical release proclaimed: "Now it's the girls who flirt". As Thomas Morales notes, The Little Wheedlers captures "this shift where the strong woman takes power in relationships of seduction but above all where she questions the meaning of her life in a consumerist society".
