= François Asensi =

French politician

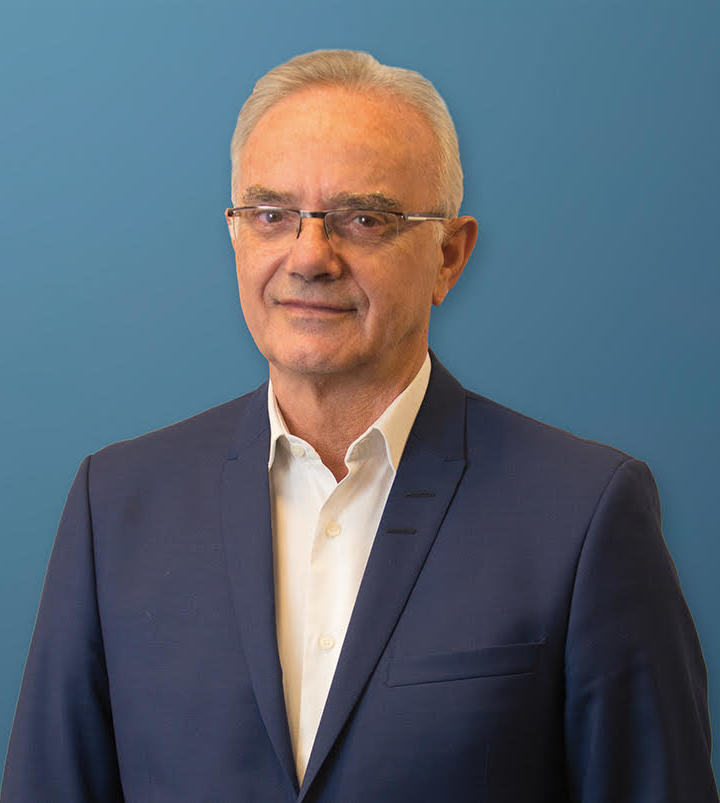
- Asensi in June 2018

Mayor of Tremblay-en-France
- Incumbent
- Assumed office 8 April 1991

Member of the National Assembly of France for Seine-Saint-Denis's 11th constituency
- In office 23 June 1988 – 20 June 2017
- Succeeded by: Clémentine Autain

Member of the National Assembly of France for Seine-Saint-Denis's 8th constituency
- In office 27 January 1981 – 14 May 1988
- Preceded by: Robert Ballanger

Municipal councillor of Villepinte
- In office 20 March 1989 – 7 April 1991

Municipal councillor of Aulnay-sous-Bois
- In office 20 November 1983 – 19 March 1989

Municipal councillor of Aubervilliers
- In office 1 January 1971 – 1 January 1977

Personal details
- Born: 1 June 1945 (age 80) Santander, Cantabria, Spain
- Party: PCF
- Other political affiliations: GDR (National Assembly group)
- Committees: Foreign Affairs Committee

François Asensi (born 1 June 1945) is a French politician who has served as the mayor of Tremblay-en-France since 1991 and served as Member of the National Assembly for Seine-Saint-Denis' 11th constituency from 1988 to 2017.

== Early life ==
François Asensi was born on 1 June 1945 in Santander, Spain to a French mother and Spanish father. His father had fought for the Republicans in the Spanish Civil War as a member of the International Brigades. Both parents were then communist activists in the underground resistance to the dictatorship of Francisco Franco. In 1947, when François was two years old, the family secretly emigrated to France with their two children. François received the status of political refugee and would become a French citizen upon attaining the age of majority.

The Asensi family resided in Aubervilliers, La Plaine Saint-Denis, with François growing up in the Landy neighbourhood. He obtained a Certificate of Professional Competence in technical drawing and began working for a company manufacturing washing machines and clothes irons.

== Political career ==
François Asensi joined the Mouvement Jeunes Communistes de France at the age of 15, protesting the Algerian War. Four years later, he became a member of the French Communist Party (PCF).

After serving in the military, Asensi worked as a secretary in the Aubervilliers chapter of the PCF and soon rose to the position of local secretary of the city. He was then appointed First Secretary of the Jeunes Communistes Federation of Seine-Saint-Denis and National Secretary of the Union of Jeunes Communistes of France after that. Asensi resigned from the Jeunesse Communiste due to disagreements with the organization and subsequently took part in reviving the Seine-Saint-Denis federation of the PCF in 1974.

At the end of 1975, Asensi became PCF secretary for Aulnay-sous-Bois. He helped prepare the Communist succession to Mayor Robert Ballanger of Aulnay-sous-Bois, who also served as a Member of the National Assembly for Seine-Saint-Denis and president of the Communist group in the National Assembly. Asensi was soon designated as Ballanger's successor and became a Member of the National Assembly after Ballanger's death in 1981. At the same time, Asensi also served as municipal councillor of Aulnay-sous-Bois, where he joined PSA Group workers in their demonstrations in 1982.

Asensi was elected federal first secretary of the PCF in Seine-Saint-Denis, serving from 1979 to 1985, whereupon he was dismissed from national party leadership and the Seine-Saint-Denis federation. This was because he had joined several Seine-Saint-Denis mayors in pushing for the transformation of the PCF into a "new revolutionary party," thereby breaking with the party's messaging surrounding worker identity. Asensi sought to reform and modernize the party's structure and create a new communist program taking into account recent societal developments. He also demanded that the PCF leadership seriously re-evaluate its ties with the Communist Party of the Soviet Union.

Asensi was elected to the National Assembly in 1986 and then re-elected in 1988, 1993, 1997, 2002, 2007 and 2012.

After having been municipal councillor of Aubrevilliers, Aulnay-sous-Bois and Villepinte, Asensi was elected mayor of Tremblay-en-France in 1991, succeeding George Prudhomme. He was subsequently re-elected in 1995, 2001, 2008, 2014 and 2020.

In 1995, Asensi became president of SEAFPA, an inter-communal union founded in 1971 by Robert Ballanger. The union covered the communes of Tremblay-en-France, Villepinte, Aulnay-sous-Bois, Sevran and Le Blanc-Mesnil and aimed to develop public policy for people with disabilities. Asensi resigned from the presidency in 2014.

Drawing from his family history with the Spanish Civil War, Asensi co-founded the Friends of the Soldiers of Republican Spain (ACER) along with fellow sons of International Brigade soldiers José Fort, Jean-Claude Lefort and Pierre Renière in 1996. He serves as the association's co-president to this day.

Asensi called for a common candidate representing all the anti-liberal forces on the left in the 2007 French presidential election, motivated by what he saw as a left-wing desire for social transformation in France after the 2005 referendum on the European Constitution. The project failed and contributed to further divisions among anti-liberals in the country.

Asensi established the agglomeration community of Terres de France in 2010, comprising Sevran, Villepinte and Tremblay-en-France. The community aimed to advance common projects and solidarity among its residents. Asensi was elected president of its community council and would hold this position until the disestablishment of Terres de France on 31 December 2015, when it was merged into the public territorial establishment of Paris Terres d'Envol along with five other cities.

Asensi left the PCF in March 2010. He began campaigning for structural reforms to the Federation for a Social and Environmental Alternative and the Left Front, the latter of which he wanted to offer direct membership. Asensi also spoke in favour of a reconfiguration of the left between the poles of social democracy and social transformation in which communism would play a major role.

In the 2012 French legislative elections, Asensi campaigned for re-election with Clémentine Autain as his designated substitute. He came in first in the first round with 35.64% of the vote and won as the only candidate in the second round after second-place candidate Stéphane Gatignon withdrew from the election.

Asensi was a sponsor for Jean-Luc Mélenchon's candidacy in the 2017 French presidential election.

In the 2017 French legislative elections, Asensi expressed his wish for Autain to succeed him as his constituency's Member of the National Assembly. He became Autain's substitute and participated in her campaign. She was ultimately elected with almost 38% of the vote in the first round and 59.52% of the vote in the second round.

== Member of the National Assembly ==
François Asensi was part of a total of seven permanent committees in the National Assembly during his career.

In 1990, he was the spokesman for the Gayssot Act, which prohibited the denial of crimes against humanity with the aim of combating racist, antisemitic and xenophobic behaviour.

From 8 October 1999 to 8 Avril 2000, Asensi was tasked by Prime Minister Lionel Jospin's government with implementing a reform to the classification of certain sports federations as charitable organizations.

He supported a 2000 law promoting equal access to electoral offices for women and men, known as the parity law.

In 2010, Asensi proposed a law recognizing territorial discrimination, which was passed in the form of the Lamy Act on 21 February 2014.

In 2010, he co-founded the academy of Banlieues with lawyer Jean-Louis Peru. The academy is an association of territorial collectivities seeking to debunk stereotypes of the banlieues by working with local actors. It conducts research, policy analysis and on-the-ground initiatives to achieve this goal.

Asensi also pushed for the removal of the term "race" from the laws of the Fifth Republic and the Constitution of 1958. This change came into effect in 2013.

With regards to international affairs, Asensi opposed the Iraq War and campaigned for France to recognize the State of Palestine.
