= Yvan Dautin =

French actor, writer, and singer

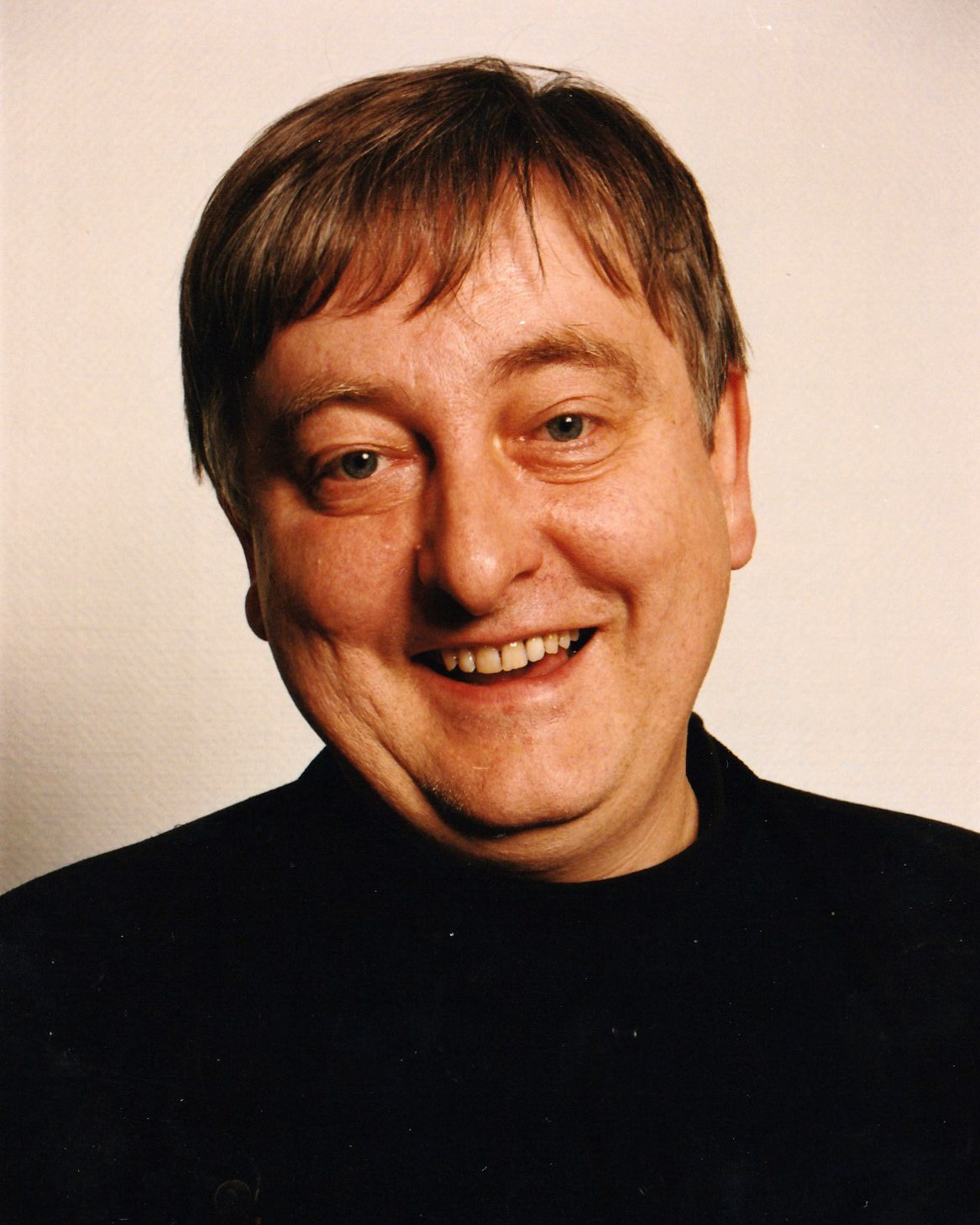
- Born: Yvan Autain; 6 May 1945 (age 81); Saint-Jean-de-Monts, France
- Occupation: Actor
- Spouse: Dominique Laffin
- Children: Clémentine Autain

Yvan Dautin (born 6 May 1945) is a French actor, writer, and singer. His best known songs are "Boulevard des Batignolles", written with Étienne Roda-Gil, and "La Méduse".

== Biography ==
He was born Yvan Autain in Saint-Jean-de-Monts in Vendée.

He was married to Dominique Laffin. Their daughter is the French politician Clémentine Autain.

== Songs ==
=== 45 rpm ===
- 1968 : Premier disque chez Pathé Marconi sous la direction de l'orchestrateur Hubert Rostaing (Yves Montand, Serge Reggiani, Maxime Le Forestier, Philippe Sarde...), avec quatre chansons de Paul Villaz. Puis, Les fiancées, Les cheveux en quatre, La défense du gendarme, L'oiseau qui fait tchack tchack (super 45t.)
- 1969 : La Comptine du cétacé, Le Piano homosexuel, Le Hibou, Ma clé de sol (super 45t.)
- 1971 : La Méduse, Ca caille, ça tourterelle (enregistrement public)
- 1972 : L'école est fermée, La mer est bleue à Plougastel
- 1976 : La Malmariée, Kate
- 1977 : Lé fame é les enfan dabor
- 1978 : La Portugaise (musique Julien Clerc et Quand j'étais dromadaire)
- 1979 : Pataquès Les mains dans les poches sous les yeux
- 1979 : Est-ce que c'est sale ça ?, Va nu-pied sur un pied
- 1981 : Le jour se lève du pied gauche, Boulevard des Batignolles coécrit avec Étienne Roda-Gil
- 1983 : L'Amour chagrin, Changez, changez
- 1985 : L'Île au trésor, Bristol
- 1987 : La plume au cœur, Léa

=== 33 rpm ===
- 1971 : Yvan Dautin, (enregistrement public à la Galerie 55 les 7 et 8 juillet 1971) EMI, 2 C 072-11782
- 1975 : Hourra ! Dément ! Génial !, 33 t STEC 193
- 1976 : Les femmes et les enfants d'abord, 33 t DiscAz STEC 235
- 1977 : Kate, la méduse, l'école est fermée etc.., en public les 4–5 mai 1977, 33 t RCA PL37091
- 1977 : Quand j’étais dromadaire, 33 t RCA/Victor PL 37 135
- 1979 : Pataquès, 33 t RCA PL 37 258
- 1981 : Le jour se lève du pied gauche, 33 t disc’AZ AZ/2 365
- 1982 : Boulevard des Batignolles, 33 t disc’AZ AZ/2 440
- 1988 : Entre chien et loup, 33 t L’escargot/mélodie ESC 30 46

=== CD ===
- Compilations :
  - 1992 : Le cœur cerise Olivi music – OVI 45202–2
  - 1992 : Ses plus grands succès Olivi – music OVI 45203-
- Albums :
  - 2008 : Ne pense plus, dépense ! Edito Musique
  - 2012 : Un monde à part – Amja Productions – Distribution : Socadisc
  - 2019 : Le cœur à l'encan (EPM)

=== Participations ===
- 1990 : Ami entends tu… la Résistance (Martine Sarri, Yvan Dautin, Jean-Pierre Lacot et Jean Sommer)/ P.A.S.A

== Acting ==
=== Television ===
- 1976 : "Cinéma 16" Voici la fin mon bel ami (Jean-Paul), réalisation Bernard Bouthier, avec Jean-Luc Bideau, Françoise Pagès, Grégoire Aslan...
- 1987 : Les Idiots (un clochard), réalisation Jean-Daniel Verhaeghe, avec Jean Carmet, Jean-Pierre Marielle...
- 1989 : Les Nuits révolutionnaires (le camelot), réalisation Charles Brabant, avec Michel Aumont, Jean-Pierre Lorit, Michel Bouquet...
- 1989 : Bouvard et Pécuchet (Verjus) d'après Flaubert, mise en scène Jean-Daniel Verhaeghe.
- 1997 : Le Serre aux truffes (Dominique), réalisation Jacques Audoir, avec Pierre Vaneck, Jean-Michel Fête...
- 2005 : Maigret et l'Etoile du nord (Marc-Antoine Lehaleux), réalisation Charles Némes, avec Bruno Crémer, Luis Rego...
- 2005 : La Légende vraie de la Tour Eiffel (le directeur du cabaret), documentaire fiction réalisé par Simon Brook.
- 2009 : "Avocats & associés" Abus dangereux (patron du bar), réalisation Claire de la Rochefoucauld, avec François-Eric Gendron, Frédéric Gorny...

=== Film ===
- 2007: Enfin veuve (gendarme) – produced by Isabelle Mergault, with Michèle Laroque, Jacques Gamblin
- 2013: Hôtel Normandy (receptionist) – produced by Charles Némes, with Helena Noguerra, Eric Elmosnino, Ary Abittan, Frédérique Bel

=== Theater ===
- 1980 : Les Misérables (Monsieur Thénardier) by Claude-Michel Schönberg and Alain Boublil (musical), directed by Robert Hossein
- 1994 : Comment va le monde, môssieu ? il tourne, môssieu ! by François Billetdoux, directed by Jean-Pierre Miquel, Théâtre national de la Colline
- 1995 : Arsenic and old lace by Joseph Kesselring, directed by Jacques Rosny, Théâtre de la Madeleine
