= Nationen =

Norwegian daily newspaper with a focus on agriculture

Nationen is a Norwegian daily newspaper with a particular focus on agriculture and rural districts. Its circulation in 2015 was 12,954, an increase of 281 copies from 2014.

== History and profile ==
Nationen was founded in 1918. The founding editor-in-chief was Thorvald Aadahl, and during his editorship the paper adopted a far-right political stance. Hans Holten, its political editor from 1945 to 1963, brought the paper into a key role for the Centre Party. The paper primarily targets farmers and the agrarian sector, with focus on district politics, farming, commentaries and features. It is based in Oslo with offices in Trondheim and Fagernes, and edited by Jannicke Engan. The newspaper relies heavily on freelance journalists for regional coverage.

Traditionally Nationen was affiliated with the Centre Party. Its founding owner was the Farmers Association. The newspaper is fully owned by Tun Media, which is controlled by the Norwegian Agrarian Association, TINE, Nortura, Landkreditt, and others. Tun Media works to promote the interests of Norwegian agriculture and rural districts. The media group also owns other publications, such as Bondebladet. Nationen was against the EU membership of Norway.

Nationen has had a tabloid format since 1986. An online version, nationen.no, was formally launched in 2001.

The newspaper is dependent on economic support from the Norwegian Government.

== Circulation ==
Numbers from the Norwegian Media Businesses' Association, Mediebedriftenes Landsforening.

Circulation 1980 - 2009
- 1980: 21,455
- 1981: 21,780
- 1982: 21,563
- 1983: 21,648
- 1984: 20,566
- 1985: 20,691
- 1986: 20,021
- 1987: 20,370
- 1988: 19,726
- 1989: 21,388
- 1990: 22,367
- 1991: 23,011
- 1992: 20,805
- 1993: 20,102
- 1994: 21,278
- 1995: 20,278
- 1996: 20,235
- 1997: 19,104
- 1998: 18,311
- 1999: 18,307
- 2000: 17,376
- 2001: 18,652
- 2002: 17,554
- 2003: 16,987
- 2004: 16,484
- 2005: 17,061
- 2006: 16,996
- 2007: 15,871
- 2008: 15,670
- 2009: 14,514
- ...
- 2014: 12,673
- 2015: 12,954
