= Juliette Rennes =

French sociologist

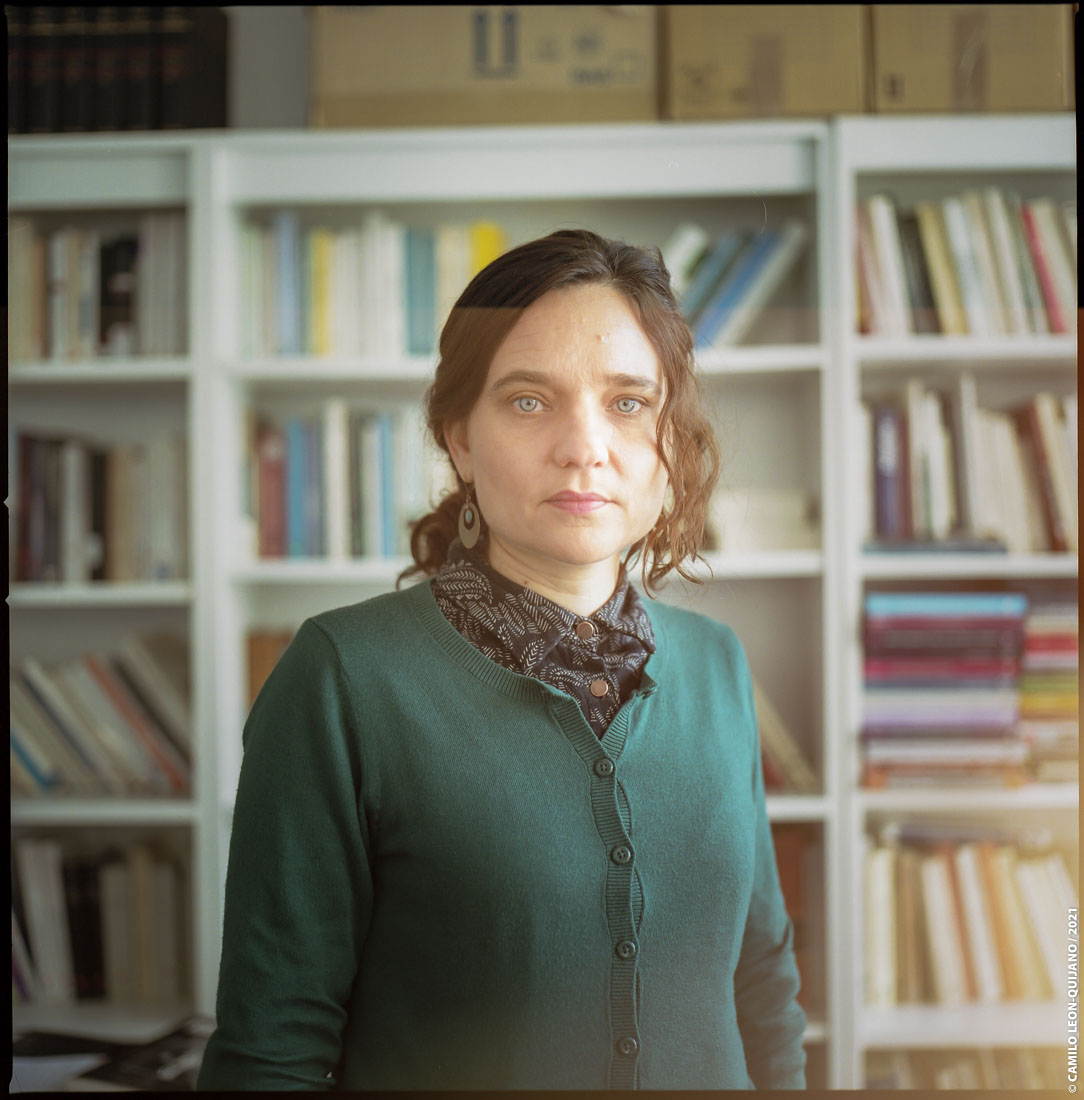
- Occupations: Sociologist; university professor; activist; political scientist

Academic background
- Education: Paris 1 Panthéon-Sorbonne University
- Thesis: 'Le mérite et la nature. Une controverse républicaine, l'accès des femmes aux professions de prestige (1880–1940)}' (2005)
- Doctoral advisor: Pierre Birnbaum

Academic work
- Discipline: Sociology
- Sub-discipline: History and sociology of gender, work, and discrimination
- Institutions: School for Advanced Studies in the Social Sciences
- Notable works: Encyclopédie critique du genre

Juliette Rennes is a French sociologist. Since 2021, she has been the director of studies at the School for Advanced Studies in the Social Sciences (EHESS). She is also the director of the Center for the Study of Social Movements (CEMS). Rennes' research topics are related to the history and sociology of gender, work, and discrimination.

== Education ==
She studied literature at the École normale supérieure in Fontenay-Saint-Cloud. She wrote her master's thesis on the French extreme right-wing pamphlets of the 1930s, then her Master of Advanced Studies thesis on the genesis and dissemination of the notion of "national preference". In 1999, she joined the association Mix-Cité and became its spokesperson from 2001 to 2003. In 2000, she began to write a thesis in political science on the sources and recompositions of anti-egalitarianism since the end of the 19th century. In 2004, she did a research stay at McGill University in Montreal, Canada where she worked with Marc Angenot. In 2005, under the direction of Pierre Birnbaum, she defended her thesis entitled Le mérite et la nature. Une controverse républicaine, l'accès des femmes aux professions de prestige (1880–1940) at the Paris 1 Panthéon-Sorbonne University.

== Career ==
In 2006, Rennes was appointed as a lecturer at the Institute of Communication of the Lumière University Lyon 2, where she taught courses on discourse theory, media semiology, and history of journalism. In 2009, she joined a Russian-speaking research network on gender, taught a master's degree on gender at European Humanities University, in Vilnius, Lithuania, in collaboration with Belarusian researchers. In 2010, she was elected to the EHESS, her research program focuses on the history of controversies related to equal rights. Since October 2010, she is co-director with Rose-Marie Lagrave and Éric Fassin of the research program at EHESS entitled " genre, politique et sexualité".

In 2015, she directed an exhibition at the Museum of Living History in Montreuil entitled "Women in Men's Professions: a visual history (XIXth-XXth))". In 2016, she directed the Encyclopédie critique du genre.

She is a statutory member of the Center for the Study of Social Movements at EHESS.

== Selected works ==
=== Books ===
- Rennes, Juliette (2000). Mythologie de la nature et pensées réactionnaires: perspectives de recherche, état des travaux sur la question (in French). OCLC 494159966.
- Rennes, Juliette (2007). Le mérite et la nature: une controverse républicaine : l'accès des femmes aux professions de prestige, 1880–1940 (in French). Fayard. ISBN 978-2-213-63161-5. OCLC 1052846450.
- Rennes, Juliette (2013). Femmes en métiers d'hommes: cartes postales : 1890-1920 : une histoire visuelle du travail et du genre (in French). Bleu autour. ISBN 978-2-358-48044-4. OCLC 1049184427.
- Rennes, Juliette (2021). Encyclopédie critique du genre (in French). La Découverte. ISBN 978-2-348-06757-0. OCLC 1249269905.
- Rennes, Juliette (2022). Métiers de rue: observer le travail et le genre à Paris en 1900 (in French). Éditions de l'École des hautes études en sciences sociales. ISBN 978-2-7132-2949-7. OCLC 1350421532.

=== Articles ===
- Rennes, Juliette (2009). "La tyrannie de l'âge". Mouvements (in French). No. 59. Paris: La Découverte. ISBN 978-2-7071-5843-7. ISSN 1291-6412. OCLC 1333963080.
- Bozon, Michel; Rennes, Juliette (31 December 2015). "The history of sexual norms: the hold of age and gender". Clio. Women, Gender, History (42): 7–23. doi:10.4000/cliowgh.1018. ISSN 2554-3822.
