= Liberty Belle (film) =

- Theatrical release poster
- Directed by: Pascal Kané
- Written by: Pascal Kané; Pascal Bonitzer
- Produced by: Margaret Menegoz
- Starring: Jerome Zucca; Dominique Laffin; André Dussollier; Jean-Pierre Kalfon; Juliette Binoche
- Cinematography: Robert Alazraki
- Edited by: Martine Giordano
- Music by: Georges Delerue
- Distributed by: Gaumont Distribution
- Release date: 14 September 1983
- Running time: 98 minutes
- Country: France
- Language: French

Liberty Belle is a 1983 French drama film and is also Juliette Binoche's film debut. The film premiered at the 1983 Cannes Film Festival.

== Plot ==
Some students get entangled with a group which opposes the French-Algerian war.

== Cast ==
- Jérôme Zucca as Julein
- Dominique Laffin as Elise
- André Dussolier as Vival
- Philippe Caroit as Gilles
- Jean-Pierre Kalfon as Brinon
- Anouk Ferjac as the mother
- Bernard-Pierre Donnadieu as Yvon
- Maurice Vallier as Censeur
- Fred Personne as Pasteur
- Anne-Laure Meury as Corinne
- Marcel Ophüls as German Teacher
- Juliette Binoche as girl at the rally
- Luc Béraud as The supervisor
