= Mix-Cité =

Mix-Cité is a mixed movement for gender equality and of sexualities, founded in 1997. It is a feminist, antisexist and universalist association for reflection and action in public, in media, and in institutions. It is a Voluntary association.

Created in 1997 in Paris, the Mix-Cité movement is currently active in Paris and in many other cities such as Toulouse, Orléans, Rennes and Nantes. These associations meet once a year for "Inter-Mix-Cité", which allows them to exchange their analyses and to take stock of their actions and causes to promote.

Put into the spotlight by their activities at Galeries Lafayette and their living mannequins, the movement also participates in different protests such as International Day for the Elimination of Violence against Women, International Women's Day, International Workers' Day, the International Day Against Homophobia, as well as LGBT Pride parades.

It also participates, especially during the Christmas season, in a campaign against sexist toys, with the Collectif Contre le Publisexisme and the Panthères Roses . This campaign began in 2002 with different methods of activism: occupations of toy stores and actions within the store departments and among the customers, invisible theatre, songs and performances in the street in front of the stores, distribution of "counter catalogues" for toys, public debates and calls to phone-in radio shows, and interventions with children. In 2009 Mix-Cité organized a letter-writing campaign to influence HALDE (Haut Autorité de Lutte contre les Discriminations et pour l'Égalité), asking it to advise against displaying sexist toys on the shelves of department stores and promote the display by age.

== Notable people ==
- Clémentine Autain
- Rokhaya Diallo
- Juliette Rennes
