= The Crying Woman =

- Film poster
- Directed by: Jacques Doillon
- Written by: Jacques Doillon
- Produced by: Danièle Delorme; Yves Robert
- Starring: Dominique Laffin; Haydée Politoff; Jacques Doillon
- Cinematography: Yves Lafaye
- Edited by: Isabelle Rathery
- Production companies: Renn Productions; Lola Films
- Distributed by: AMLF
- Release date: 10 January 1979
- Running time: 90 minutes
- Country: France
- Language: French
- Box office: $1.9 million

The Crying Woman (original title: La Femme qui pleure) is a 1979 French drama film directed by Jacques Doillon.

== Plot ==
Jacques comes back after a long absence from his wife, Dominique, and their daughter, Lola. They live in an isolated house located on a hill in Haute-Provence. Dominique cries when she sees him.

She had driven him away because Jacques cannot stand the way she cries. Jacques is helpless to the excesses of her emotion. But this time, he returns because he loves another woman.

Following a minor accident suffered by Lola, Dominique realizes she cannot continue living alone. She asks to meet Haydee, the new woman and tries to get along with her. Jacks and Haydee settle in his house, but he leaves, During his absence, Haydée helps Dominique care for Lola.

Upon his return, the discomfort grows. Haydée may be pregnant, but the test is negative. Realizing her affair with Jacques has no future, Haydee leaves. Dominique, in a crazy gesture, tries to kill her with Jacques’ car.

Later, Jacques and Dominique are alone face to face, but face realize a reconciliation is impossible. Dominique vacates with Lola, leaving Jacques in his solitude.

== Cast ==
- Dominique Laffin as Dominique
- Haydée Politoff as Haydée
- Jacques Doillon as Jacques
- Lola Doillon as Lola
- Jean-Denis Robert as Jean-Denis
- Michel Vivian as Michel

== Accolades ==
| Year | Award | Category | Recipient | Result |
|---|---|---|---|---|
| 1980 | César Awards | Best Actress | Dominique Laffin | Nominated |
