= Rokhaya Diallo =

French journalist (born 1978)

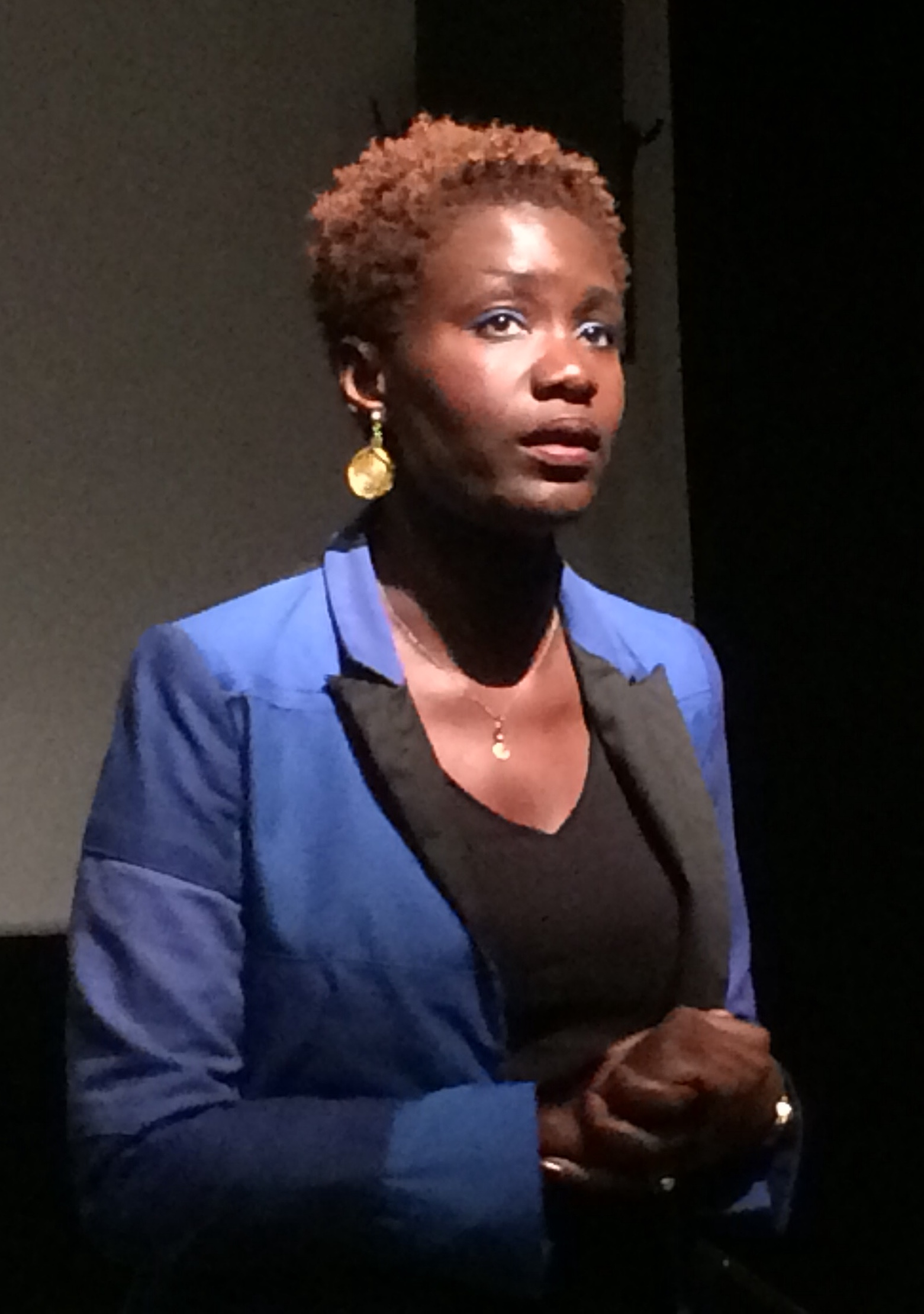
- Diallo in 2017
- Born: 10 April 1978 (age 48); 4th arrondissement of Paris, France
- Occupations: Journalist, activist, film-maker
- Website: rokhayadiallo.com

Rokhaya Diallo (French pronunciation: [ʁɔkɛja djalo]; born 10 April 1978) is a French journalist, author, film-maker, and activist for racial, gender and religious equality. According to The New York Times, she is “one of France's most prominent anti-racism activists.”

She is a BET-France host and has produced and/or directed documentaries, television and radio programs. She hosts the podcast "En Bonne Voix". She has published: Racism: a guide, France Belongs to Us, France: One and Multicultural and How to talk to kids about racism, a graphic novel Pari(s) d'Amies, and Afro! featuring Afro-Parisians who wear natural hairstyles.

== Biography ==
Rokhaya Diallo was born in 1978, in Paris, France, to Senegalese and Gambian parents. Her father was a mechanic and her mother a sewing teacher. Her family moved to La Courneuve, a suburb of Paris, in 1989.

After obtaining a master's degree in International and European law, Diallo went on to study business, which led her to work for a short period at IBM, which she left because she felt "like a pawn". So she decided to work toward a marketing and distribution degree at the Université Panthéon-Sorbonne (Paris I), which she earned in 2003.

As an anime enthusiast, Diallo helped found the Japan Expo. She was also briefly a voice actress, performing Kamui Shiro as a child in X1999, by CLAMP, and Ex in Ah! My Goddess: The Movie.

In 2001, she participated in the youth outreach programme of La Courneuve. She was asked to join in the city's Youth Council and rose to the position of president within two years. As a feminist, she campaigns for the anti-sexist association Mix-Cité. She also campaigns for the organization ATTAC, which fights for sustainable and socially just globalization policies, notably during the Film Festival "Images mouvementées".

On 24 August 2020, she was named a contributor to the Global Opinions section of The Washington Post.

In 2021, she became a researcher at the Gender Justice Initiative Research Center at Georgetown University in Washington. In France, she teaches cultural studies at Paris 1 Panthéon-Sorbonne University.

=== The Indivisibles ===
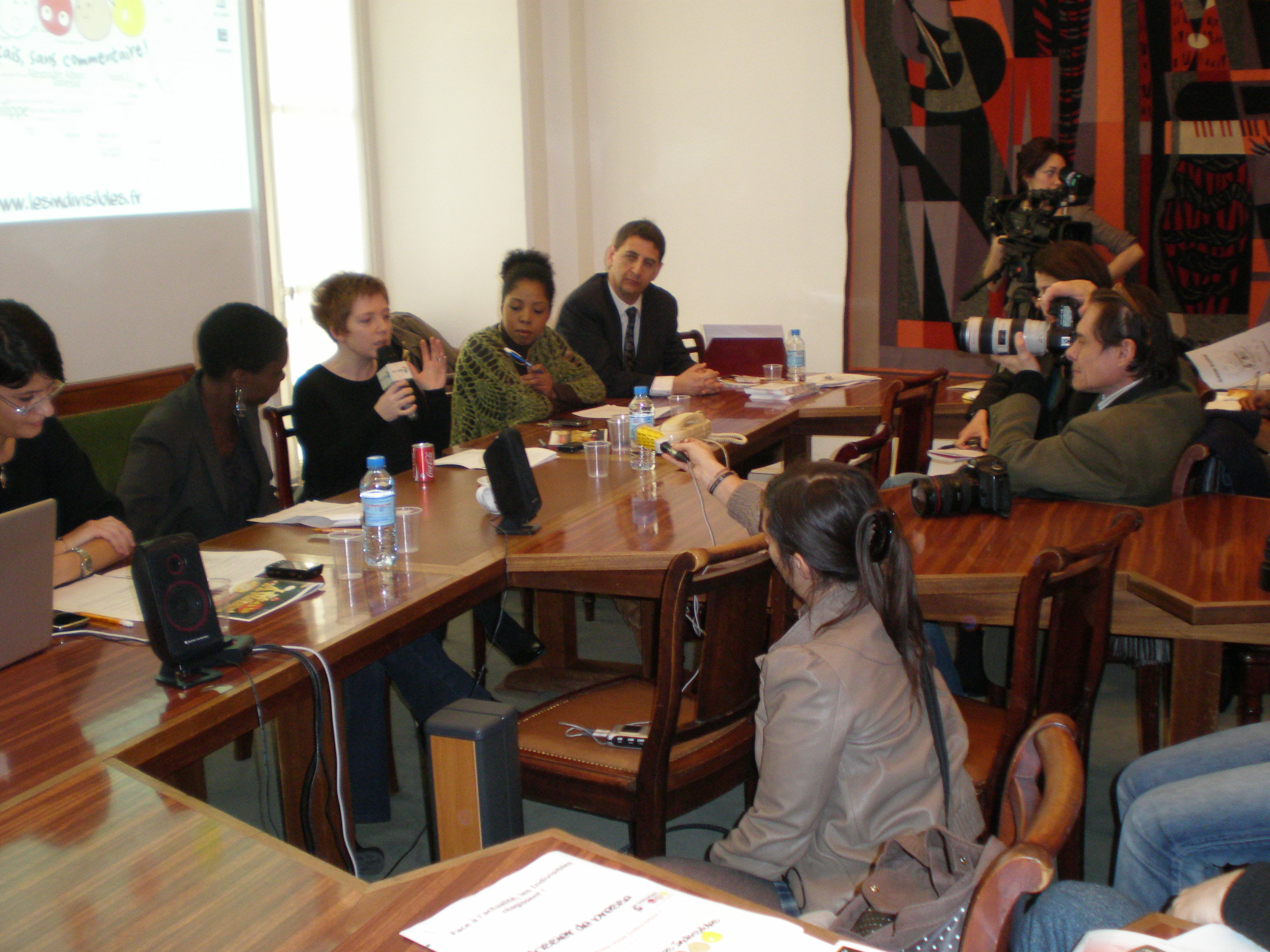
Diallo (second from left) at the press conference for the first "Y'a bon Awards" in 2009

In 2006, having heard that "most people consider being black and from a working class background to be a problem", Diallo founded the association, The Indivisibles. "People's looks seemed to associate me with a certain image and uncomfortable stereotypes." "When we were young, my brother and I had never asked ourselves, 'Where do we come from?', until we were asked by others". Diallo was not bothered by attaching the question to one's origin, but she objects to people placing their own yearning for exoticism over her. The Indivisibles campaigns to put a stop to "a partition of French citizenship by physical appearance" or by geographical origin. Originally created in secrecy, to "work with institutions such as the French Education Department", the association burst on to the publishing scene in 2009 with a large media exposure programme oriented around their newly created "Y'a bon Awards" recognizing the most outrageous racist statements by French public figures.

Diallo became a radio and television commentator and in 2011 she published Racism: a guide, in the philosopher Vincent Cespedes' collection. "France is my country. I know Paris better than Senegal. But how should she behave in a "structurally racist" environment? Mentalities need to change. Especially in the media, when their coverage of a news story focuses solely on a defendant's skin color or geographical origin". Exposing Islamophobia holds an increasingly important place in her reasoning: "We only speak of secular education when the subject is Islam (and not in regard to any other religion), a religion we are led to believe is only practiced in France by sexist and violent fundamentalists of North African origin."

=== Activity since 2004 ===
In 2002, Diallo took part in different humorous short-films by the group Une case en moins, as an actress, singer and songwriter.

From 2009 to 2013, she was a commentator for La Matinale on Canal+, and from 2009 on RTL (French radio station). In March 2010, she was chosen to participate in the International Visitor Leadership Program and as a guest of the US Government. She visited the country to study its diversity.

With four other leading figures – François Durpaire, Marc Cheb Sun, Lilian Thuram and Pascal Blanchard – she developed a list of 100 propositions for "a multicultural and post-racial Republic".

Since 2011, Diallo has hosted Fresh Cultures on the Mouv' (French radio station); she also hosted and co-directed a monthly show Égaux mais pas trop ("Equals but not too much") on LCP.

In March 2014, she published an editorial opinion piece in the weekly review Politis for International Women's Day.

== Journalism ==
=== Press ===
Along with other personalities (Audrey Pulvar, Lilian Thuram, Pascal Blanchard...), she is featured in the October 2011 issue of Respect Mag magazine entitled "100% Blacks in France ". She has produced several reports for the French press, such as on women in Bahrain and on racism in Tunisia for Les Inrocks, or on the Black Lives Matter movement, which made the front page of the newspaper Libération.

Diallo also writes articles for the international press: The Washington Post, The Guardian and Al Jazeera.

=== Radio ===
She has been a columnist since 2009 on RTL.

Since 2011, Diallo has been hosting France Culture on Mouv'. For a column for the Canal+ channel and for radio le Mouv', she went at the end of September 2011 to the annual meeting of the Black Congressional Caucus in Washington, D.C., a Congressional caucus in the U.S. Congress created at the time of the Black Civil Rights struggle to bring together black parliamentarians.

In September 2018, she created the podcast Kiffe ta race, with Grace Ly, which was broadcast on the Binge Audio platform.

=== Television ===
She was a columnist from 2009 to 2013 for Canal+35's La Matinale.

Between 2011 and 2013, she presented and co-directed 18 issues of the monthly programme Égaux mais pas trop (in English: "Equal but not too much") on LCP, supported by the national agency for social cohesion and equal opportunities. The programme will be removed from the parliamentary channel's schedule in 201436. Caroline Fourest writes that Diallo complacently interviewed Dieudonné and Alain Soral in her programme Égaux mais pas trop on LCP on 9 August 2012.

From 6 December 2014 to 31 May 2015, she hosted, on Mediapart, six programmes in a series called Alter-égaux, devoted to "issues of inequality and equality, race and racism, discrimination and affirmation. 38 She invites successively: Jean-Loup Amselle; Dominique Sopo; Nadia Geerts; Caroline De Haas; Raphaël Glucksmann; and James Cohenn.

In July 2017, the press mentions her arrival as a columnist in "Touche pas à mon poste!" (in English "Don't touch my post!") on C8. Her arrival on the show was linked to a line change wanted by host Cyril Hanouna after the criticisms for the "homophobic, racist and sexist remarks" that targeted her during the 2016–2017 season. "The programme will keep its fundamentals and its entertaining values but it will move up the line," he told Challenges magazine. Rokhaya Diallo will be alongside other new recruits: Rachid Arhab, who was a journalist and TV presenter on France 2 and a former member of the Conseil supérieur de l'audiovisuel (CSA), Louis Morin, a former member of the Petit Journal, and Renaud Revel, former editor-in-chief of L'Express and head of the media section at the Journal du Dimanche41. This announcement caused a surprise on social networks, as the programme was "pinned for discriminatory abuses".43 Rokhaya Diallo explains his decision to accept the position as follows for Libération: "The audience of Touche pas à mon poste! is a popular audience, it is not an audience pampered by the media, and it is not an audience that I find respected. 44 It only stays there for one season.

She has also been the presenter of the BET Buzz programme on Black Entertainment Television (BET), alongside Raphäl Yem, since 2016. BET broadcasts programmes dedicated to "black culture" in France. It presents a weekly half-hour "people" and "lifestyle" magazine23.

Since September 2018, she has been participating in the programme "24H Pujadas" on the LCI channel once a week, as much as a presenter. She discusses political and social current events with guests and other columnists.

In Le Monde, Benoît Thieulin, founder of the Netscouade, declared in January 2018: "She is intelligent, courageous, she looks good on television. In other words, she embodies something that can be watched. Better still, the generations of tomorrow."

== Stances ==
=== Anti-racism ===
Diallo's action is consistent with the fight for race and ethnic equality, "especially among non-white French citizens, as their French identity is so often denied and depreciated." (presentation of the Indivisibles on their website). She is a member of the advisory board of the Berlin-based NGO Center for Intersectional Justice, which seeks to address intersecting forms of discrimination and inequality.

In June 2013, someone found guilty of using Twitter to call for Diallo's rape was sentenced to pay a fine of 2000 euros, of which 1400 were suspended, and 1000 euros for damages to the plaintiff. The following year, Diallo produced a documentary for French channels LCP/AN and France 3, Networks of Hate, covering hate speech and freedom of speech online.

=== Campaigning against anti-black racism ===
- Reporting for TV channel Canal+ and radio station le Mouv', in September 2011, Diallo attended the annual meeting of the Congressional Black Caucus (organization representing the black members of the United States Congress, created at the time of the Civil Rights Movement to unite black members of Congress).
- With Audrey Pulvar, Lilian Thuram, Pascal Blanchard, Diallo appeared on the cover of the October issue of Respect Mag titled "100% French & Black".
- In January 2012, after the publication of an article in Elle magazine considered racist, she co-authored with Sonia Rolland, China Moses, Eric Fassin, Clementine Autain, Audrey Pulvard, and many other figures, an opinion column in Le Monde questioning the magazine's lack of black women on its covers.

=== Gay rights ===
In December 2012, she took part in a demonstration supporting the right of gay couples to marry, where she noticed the lack of black participation.

=== Under-representation of black women in women's magazines ===
In January 2012, following the publication in the pages of Elle magazine of an article on black fashion deemed racist, she co-signed with Sonia Rolland, China Moses, Éric Fassin, Clémentine Autain, Audrey Pulvar and many other personalities, a column in Le Monde questioning the magazine about the absence of black women on its covers. On 6 March 2014, she signed the editorial of the weekly Politis on the occasion of International Women's Rights Day.

=== Decolonial Summer Camp ===
Rokhaya Diallo defends the organization of summer camps, some of whose meetings are "open only to 'racialized' people, i.e. those who feel they are victims of discrimination because of their origin [...]62". It justifies itself by referring to the desire to "meet among people who are victims of racist violence, for a few hours, in a peaceful manner. 63,64 "She claims non-mixing as a useful political tool for anti-racist and feminist causes, which, in her view, makes it possible in particular to protect oneself from what she describes as "State racism". In an article for Slate, she writes on this subject: "Afrofeminist meetings that are not mixed are in no way intended to propose a definitive project for a segregationist society, since they are part of the temporality of a specific event. They offer their participants an escape route, a breathing zone in an oppressive society ".

=== Criticism of the "a-critical" use of the term "anti-white racism" ===
Rokhaya Diallo is one of the signatories of a column, published in L'Obs, criticizing two passages of a policy text adopted for three years by the Movement against Racism and for Friendship between Peoples (MRAP) at its congress on 30 March and 1 April 2012. The signatories note the problems raised by the "a-critical" use of the concept of "anti-white racism". According to them, it is necessary, "to recall, with Albert Memmi, what he explained half a century ago, no link can be made between the racism of the dominant, reflecting and relying on the power of the devices of domination, and what he called "toothless racism", that is to say this form of "racism" of the dominated, without force, without power, incapable of being anything other than words, ...".

"How can we fail to see that the notion of 'anti-white racism' has emerged in the French political debate in order to invert the relationship of responsibility: the 'victim' would no longer be the immigrant or the descendant of immigrants but the white person, an inversion that can be expressed in another way; if hostility to immigration increases, it is the fault of the immigrants, or again: if immigrants live and work in terrible conditions, well, it is their fault."

=== Communitarianism ===
Rokhaya Diallo wrote in 2011 in Racism User's Guide: "What is most striking is that the 'communities' stigmatized by the accusation of anti-republicanism do not exist! An association can bring together black people not in the name of belonging to a community, but in the name of the same experience: that of being black in France. Moreover, the terms "communitarian" and "communitarianist" are often confused: communitarianism is a political approach aimed at separatism. But what do community groups want if not inclusion in the Republic? Strangely enough, community groups are not always decried, they are even the subject of a double discourse. Anti-community offensives are aimed in particular at black people or people from the Maghreb. Those of Portuguese, Chinese or Jewish origin – or even people from Auvergne, whose social, economic or cultural organization, often marked by community belonging, is highly visible in the public sphere – are spared any criticism."

=== Afro-feminism, intersectional and "decolonial" feminism ===
Rokhaya Diallo defines herself as "an intersectional and decolonial feminist". In an interview for the Inrocks in 2017, she states: "I have always been aware of sexism, I found it more prevalent than racism in my environment. I wasn't sent back to my skin colour until I was an adult. In my neighbourhood, not being white wasn't an issue, but gender inequality was. It is close to non-mixed Afrofeminist movements such as the Mwasi collective and to intersectional feminism, which believes that oppression or domination can be multiple (gender, class, race...).

Rejecting universalist feminism, she subscribes to a more identity-based feminism: Afro-feminism, Islamic feminism. In an interview for the webzine Deuxième page, she explained: "For me, the word 'feminist' implicitly includes all these minority denominations" and traditional feminism (Dare feminism!, Les Chiennes de garde...) is very "white" and bourgeois, and does not take into account at all the specific problems of some women, especially black, Muslim or minority women."...the vast majority of Islamophobic acts concern veiled women, and are therefore clearly sexist. Yet this does not elicit any reaction from traditional feminist associations." "As far as veiled Muslim women are concerned, there is a problem: we want to fight them. Even if they are victims of sexism by veiling themselves, as some people claim, you cannot punish a victim."

In October 2015, she took part in the March for Dignity, organized, with the support of Angela Davis, by a group of associations and personalities fighting sexism, racism and police crime [which the group believes] is the ultimate expression of state racism. By claiming to be "Afrofeminists" or "decolonial feminists," this mode of struggle "troubles historical activists," according to Le Monde.

For Elsa Dorlinn :

"...today, the idea that [white women] define for all women the right way to emancipate is – rightly – contested. »

In February 2015, Frédérique Calandra, PS mayor of the 20th arrondissement of Paris, refused Rokhaya Diallo a platform to talk about violence against women during the Week for Gender Equality. She says of her decision that: "Rokhaya Diallo's point of view cannot represent feminism. She is made for feminism just as I am made for being an archbishop. She is at best a useful idiot of Muslim fundamentalism, at worst a false nose of Tariq Ramadan. She also promised, "If Mrs. Diallo ever wants to debate, no problem, I'll beat her up! " Rokhaya Diallo spoke in a small room on the 20th, where more than a hundred people came to listen to her, particularly about the discriminatory treatment of sexual assault. Emmanuelle Rivier, Europe Ecology deputy for the Greens in charge of equality in the district, said she did not understand the reasons for the city council's refusal to invite Rokhaya Diallo. In September 2018, Frédérique Calandra also withdrew a subsidy that her town hall had given to a festival because Rokhaya Diallo was invited.

In 2015, Caroline Fourest wrote:

"Reading Rokhaya Diallo, it is never the time to denounce patriarchal and fundamentalist oppression, even when you are a victim and yourself a Muslim. Her "feminism" is used to mock feminists of Muslim culture who dare to stand up to fundamentalism sometimes at the cost of their lives, accusing them of wanting to sell "best-sellers". Her main struggle, as a "feminist", consists in rehabilitating the veil and attacking the laity. »

In November 2017, Diallo stated:

"I don't see how marking femininity with a veil is more sexist than marking it with high heels or a miniskirt. There is no reason to isolate the veil from the rest of the attributes associated with femininity."

=== Sex Work ===
She co-authored an op-ed published in Libération on November 21, 2013, taking a stand against the criminalization of clients of sex workers. Entitled "Féministes, donc contre la pénalisation des clients" (Feminists, therefore against the criminalization of clients), this article relays the arguments of Médecins du Monde, the Sex Work Union and Act Up-Paris, explaining that the criminalization of clients will increase cases of HIV transmission to sex workers; it is signed by the "collectif du 8 mars pour toutes" (March 8 for all).

== Recognition and awards ==
- January 2012 – Prize for Combating Racism and Discrimination awarded by the Conseil pour la Justice, l’Egalité et la Paix – COJEP (an international NGO working for democracy, human rights, the fight against racism and discrimination, living together and citizenship, affiliated with the UN and the Council of Europe)
- Listed by Slate as 36th out of the 100 most influential French women in 2013.
- Appears among the 30 most influential black figures in Europe on Britain's Powerful Media's ranking.
- October 2014 – #LabComWomen prizewinner in the category "Generosity". The prize created by TF1 and LABCOM recognizes women with noteworthy profiles, working and ambassadors in the digital world.
- In March 2015, her documentary Steps to Liberty (Les Marches de la liberté), which questions France's identity through the prism of young American leaders, won Best Documentary Film at the Regional and International Festival of Guadeloupe (FEMI).
- Senegalese Diaspora for Equality and Justice's Sununet Prize for her positive contribution to the international image of Senegal
- In 2016, at the European Diversity Awards ceremony in London, she was awarded a distinction honouring her work in the category "Journalist of the Year".
- In 2017, she was the only French guest to attend the inauguration of the Obama Foundation in Chicago.

== Filmography ==
- 2013: Steps to liberty, documentary filmed for France Ô
- 2014: Les Réseaux de la haine, documentary filmed for LCP/AN and France 3 – IDF
- 2014–2015: Brothers in arms, television series by Rachid Bouchareb and Pascal Blanchard, presented by Charles N'Tchoéré
- 2016: From Paris to Ferguson : guilty of being black, documentary filmed for France Ô
- 2016: USA : the Caribbean recipe for success, produced by Rok’nProd / Smooth and Sidle / Real Eyes
- 2020: Où sont les Noirs ?, documentaire, réalisé par Rokhaya Diallo, produit par Redstone/ Les Bons Clients.
- 2021: La Parisienne démystifiée, documentaire produit par De l'Autre Côté du Périph' pour France 3 Paris-Île-de-France et TV5 Monde
- 2021: Bootyful, documentaire produit par La Belle Télé.

== Bibliography ==
=== Articles ===
- "France appointed a minister under investigation for alleged rape. Women are pushing back", – The Washington Post, 17 July 2020
- "France is still in denial about racism and police brutality" – Al Jazeera, June 2020
- "France refuses to talk about race. New protests could change that" – The Washington Post, 18 June 2020
- "Coronavirus exposed the real reasons behind France's 'burqa ban'" – Al Jazeera, May 2020
- "France is blaming the poor for their own deaths. But look at how it treats them" – The Washington Post, April 2020
- "No France. Africa is not your testing ground" – The Washington Post, April 2020
- "France's COVID-19, failures are the result of decades of austerity" – Al Jazeera, April 2020
- "France on lockdown : vacation for some, a nightmare for many" – Al Jazeera, April 2020
- "French cinema is still refusing to face its racism" – Al Jazeera, Marth 2020
- "French whiteness is in crisis" – Al Jazeera, October 2019
- "Why are the 'yellow vest protesting in France?" – Al Jazeera, December 2018
- "In there anti-white racism in France?" – Al Jazeera, October 2018
- "On football, identity and 'Frenchness'" – Al Jazeera, August 2018
- "Don't let France's World Cup victory erase the issues affecting black French people" – The Washington Post, July 2018
- "Migrants shouldn't have to be superheros to be accepted in France" – The Washington Post, June 2018
- "Can a Muslim perform at the Bataclan in Paris?" – Al Jazeera, June 2018
- "When an Afro-Feminist festival defies white supremacy" – Al Jazeera, June 2018
- "Hijab : a very French obsession" – Al Jazeera, April 2018
- "'I Am French, The Daughter Of Immigrants, And I Am Ashamed'", The World Post – A Partnership of The Huffington Post and Berggruen Institute. September 2015
- "Addressing anti-gypsyish must be a priority on International Roma Day", EurActiv. April 2015
- "In France, who gets to be a feminist?", New Statesman. March 2015
- "Zyed and Bouna: 2 Sacrificed Children of the French Republic", The World Post – A Partnership of The Huffington Post and Berggruen Institute. January 2015
- "Fighting Denial and Suspicion in France", Open Society Foundations. January 2015
- Through Denial, "France Has Created Its Own Monsters", The World Post – A Partnership of The Huffington Post and Berggruen Institute. January 2015
- "We Have Fergusons in France – but the French Media Looks Away", The Root. September 2014
- "French descendants of postcolonial immigrants: we refuse to be the adjustment variable in the French presidential election", Le Monde. May 2012

=== Books ===
- Racism: a guide, Larousse, coll. "Philosopher", March 2011 (ISBN 2035847907)
- Trussing a Domestic, Syllepse, September 2011
- France belongs to us, Michel Lafont, April 2012
- France: One and Multicultural, Fayard, April 2012
- How to talk to kids about racism, Le Baron Perché, May 2013 (ISBN 2360800752)
- Me, racist? Never! Scenes of ordinary racism, Flammarion, March 2015 (ISBN 2081359243)
- Afro!, Les Arenes, November 2015
- Don't stay in your place !, Marabout (maison d'édition), April 2019
- France, you love it or shut it ?, Textuel, October 2019

=== Comic ===
- Pari(s) d’amies, Delcourt, April 2015 (ISBN 2756053554)
- M'explique pas la vie, mec ! with Blachette, Marabout, 28 October 2020.
