= Norwegian Media Authority =

Norwegian government agency

- Company type: Government agency
- Industry: Authority
- Founded: 1 January 2005
- Headquarters: Fredrikstad, Norway
- Area served: Norway
- Key people: Mari Velsand (Director)
- Number of employees: 38
- Parent: Ministry of Culture and Equality
- Website: medietilsynet.no

The Norwegian Media Authority (Norwegian: Medietilsynet) is a Norwegian government agency subordinate to the Ministry of Culture and Equality charged with various tasks relating to broadcasting, newspapers and films. It enforces rules on content, advertising and sponsorship for broadcast media, administers newspaper production grants and enforces rules on media ownership. Prior to 2023 the authority also classified movies.

== Activities ==
The authority's tasks include

- enforcing rules on content, advertising and sponsorship for broadcast media; handling license applications for local broadcast media
- handling applications for newspaper production grants for non-leading newspapers, minority language newspapers and Sami newspapers
- overseeing and intervening against the acquisition of media ownership (either prohibiting the acquisition or merger, or allowing an acquisition on such conditions as the Authority sets, including ordering the divestment of other media ownership interests.

== History ==
The agency was established 1 January 2005 by merging three government agencies:

- Norwegian Board of Film Classification (Statens filmtilsyn), which was in charge of rating movies.
- Norwegian Media Ownership Authority (Eierskapstilsynet), which oversaw media ownership.
- Mass Media Authority (Statens medieforvaltning, SMF), which had tasks related to broadcasting and newspapers.

The new authority was located in Fredrikstad from 20 March 2006, where the Mass Media Authority already was located, but in a new building.

In 2003, the agency was moved from Oslo to Fredrikstad from 20 March 2006, where the Mass Media Authority had been located. This was a program along with six other directorates and inspectorates which were moved out of Oslo, which had been initialized by Victor Norman, Minister of Government Administration and Reform of the Conservative Party. It cost 729 million Norwegian krone (NOK) to move the seven agencies. An official report from 2009 concluded that the agencies had lost 75 to 90% of their employees, mostly those with long seniority, and that for a while critical functions for society were dysfunctional. No costs reductions had been made, there was no significant impact on the target area, and there was little impact on the communication between the agencies and the ministries. In a 2010 report, Professor Jarle Trondal concluded that none of the agencies had become more independent after the move, despite this being one of the main arguments from the minister. Norman successor, Heidi Grande Røys of the Socialist Left Party, stated that the moving had had an important symbolic effect on the target areas, and that she did not see the lack of advantages as a reason to not move similar agencies later.

The first director of the agency was Tom Thoresen, who was succeeded in 2017 by Mari Velsand.

== Classification system ==
=== Current certifications ===
| Classification | Appropriate age | Description | Year implemented | Observations | Movies |
|---|---|---|---|---|---|
| A | All ages | Allowed for all ages | 1994 | Replaces classification 5. | Fantasia 2000, Cars, The Wizard of Oz, Cars 3, Black Cat Detective (Note: In IMDb the A classification is used) (only in IMDb) |
| 6 | 6 years or older | Allowed for anyone 6 years of age or older. Children under 6 years old can watch it in movie theaters if they are accompanied by an adult | 2015 | Replaces classification 7 (Note: In IMDb classification 6 is not used since classification 7 is exclusively used for IMDb.) | Incredibles 2, Cars 2, Despicable Me 3, The Good Dinosaur, Toy Story, Frozen, Cars 3, The Simpsons Movie, The Lego Movie, Rango, Zootopia |
| 9 | 9 years or older | Children under 9 years old (but down to 6 years) can watch it in movie theaters if they are accompanied by an adult | 2015 | Replace the rating 11 along with the rating 12. | Ford v Ferrari, Goosebumps 2: Haunted Halloween, Spider-Man: Into the Spider-Verse, Beauty and the Beast, Ghostbusters, Star Wars: Episode V - The Empire Strikes Back, Casablanca |
| 12 | 12 years or older | Children under the age of 12 (but down to 9 years) can watch it in movie theaters if they are accompanied by an adult. | 1954 | Abolished in 1994 and replaced by rating 11, but it was re-implemented in 2015 as a replacement for rating 11. | Avengers: Endgame, Spider-Man: Homecoming, 2012, Pirates of the Caribbean: Dead Man's Chest, Mortal Kombat (Netflix), 10,000 BC, Spider-Man 2 (Re-classification), Star Wars: Episode II - Attack of the Clones (re-classification), Oblivion, Batman v Superman: Dawn of Justice, Vacation |
| 15 | 15 years or older | Young people under the age of 15 (but down to 12 years) can see it in movie theaters if they are accompanied by an adult. | 1988 | Replaces classification 16. | 1917, The Mechanical Orange (re-classification), Cars 2 (2020 re-classification in Bergen, Tromsø and Svalbard), The Godfather (only in iTunes), The Godfather II (re-classification), An American Werewolf in London, Final Destination, Teenage Mutant Ninja Turtles, World War Z, Cold Prey 2, Fast Five |
| 18 | 18 years or older | Absolute lower limit. In cinemas, everyone who is present must be at least 18 years old. | 1970 | It also applies to films that must be presented in theaters, but that are not presented for classification by the NMA. | |

=== Obsolete certifications ===
| Classification | Appropriate age | Description | Implemented. | Suppressed | Observations |
|---|---|---|---|---|---|
| 5 | 5 years or more | Absolute lower limit | 1970 | 1994 | Replaced by A-rating |
| 7 | 7 years or older | Children under the age of 7 can watch it in movie theaters if they are accompanied by an adult | 1954 | 2015 | Replaced by 6-rating |
| 10 | 10 years or more | Children under the age of 10 can watch it in movie theaters if they are accompanied by an adult | 1988 | 1994 | Replaced by 11-rating |
| 11 | 11 years or older | Children under the age of 11 can watch it in movie theaters if they are accompanied by an adult | 1994 | 2015 | Replaced by 9 and 12 classifications |
| 16 | 16 years or older | Allowed for anyone 16 years of age or older. | 1921 | 1988 | Replaced by 15-rating |
| Forbidden | | It is not allowed for its premiere in theaters | 1913 | 2004 | Only partially abolished. Classification is still mandatory for films to be presented to an audience under the age of 18. The NMA cannot register or classify films that it considers contrary to Norwegian criminal law. |

=== Prohibited content ===
As of 2004, it was no longer necessary to classify the films that should be seen by people 18 years of age or older. If a distributor decides to register a film without classification, the distributor of the film will be criminally liable if the film has content prohibited by Norwegian law.

The prohibited contents in movies and other entertainment media in Norway are:

- Child pornography
- Pornography (with exceptions)
- Improper use of serious depictions of violence for entertainment purposes.
