= Seine-Saint-Denis's 11th constituency =

Constituency of the National Assembly of France

11th constituency of Seine-Saint-Denis
- inline Constituency of the National Assembly of France

- Deputy: Clémentine Autain; L'Après
- Department: Seine-Saint-Denis
- Registered voters: 62,665

The 11th constituency of Seine-Saint-Denis (French: Onzième circonscription de la Seine-Saint-Denis) is one of the 12 legislative constituencies in Seine-Saint-Denis département of France (93). Like the other 576 French constituencies, it elects one MP using the two-round system.

== Deputies ==
Election	Member	Party	Source
1988	François Asensi	PCF	
1993	François Asensi	PCF	
1997	François Asensi	PCF	
2002	François Asensi	PCF	
2007	François Asensi	PCF	
2012	François Asensi	PCF	
2017	Clémentine Autain	LFI	
2022	Clémentine Autain	LFI	
2024	Clémentine Autain	LFI	
2024	Clémentine Autain	L'Après	

== Election results ==
=== 2024 ===
Candidate	Party	Alliance	First round			Second round		
Candidate	Party	Alliance	Votes	%	+/–	Votes	%	+/–
Clémentine Autain	LFI	NFP	22,209	62.65	+15.96			
Renée Joly	RN		6,694	18.88	+5.76			
Fayza Basini	DVC	ENS	3,702	10.44	-0.27			
Max Maran	DIV		1,658	4.68	N/A			
Kahina Näit-Kaci	UDI		801	2.26	+1.10			
Charlotte Séchet	LO		388	1.09	+0.29			
Lucien Belzane	DIV		0	0.00	N/A			
Valid votes			35,452	97.59	+0.05			
Blank votes			570	1.57	-0.16			
Null votes			306	0.84	+0.11			
Turnout			36,328	56.22	+23.28			
Abstentions			28,289	43.78	-23.28			
Registered voters			64,617					
Source: Ministry of the Interior, Le Monde
Result						LFI HOLD		

=== 2022 ===
Legislative Election 2022: Seine-Saint-Denis's 11th constituency
Party	Candidate	Votes	%	±%
LFI (NUPÉS)	Clémentine Autain	9,400	46.15	+3.07
PCF	Virginie de Carvalho*	3,091	15.18	N/A
RN	Renée Joly	2,672	13.12	−1.25
PRV (Ensemble)	Hakima Ouaret	2,181	10.71	−17.56
DVC	Febrice Scagni	776	3.81	N/A
REC	Guillemette Dusausoy	549	2.70	N/A
DVD	Ton Tona Khul	425	2.09	N/A
Others	N/A	1,274		
Turnout		20,883	32.94	−2.09
2nd round result
LFI (NUPÉS)	Clémentine Autain	11,296	100.0	+40.48
Turnout		11,296	22.90	−8.53
LFI hold				

* PCF dissident; withdrew before the 2nd round.

=== 2017 ===
Legislative Election 2017: Seine-Saint-Denis's 11th constituency
Party	Candidate	Votes	%	±%
LFI	Clémentine Autain	7,977	37.21	N/A
LREM	Elsa Wanlin	6,062	28.27	N/A
FN	Marie Mavande	3,080	14.37	+0.78
LR	Christine Perron	2,113	9.86	−8.21
PS	Laurent Chantrelle	678	3.16	N/A
EELV	Céline Fréby	580	2.71	−22.52
Others	N/A	950		
Turnout		21,952	35.03	−12.90
2nd round result
LFI	Clémentine Autain	10,962	59.52	N/A
LREM	Elsa Wanlin	7,456	40.48	N/A
Turnout		19,693	31.43	+5.52
LFI gain from FG		Swing		

=== 2012 ===
Legislative Election 2012: Seine-Saint-Denis's 11th constituency
Party	Candidate	Votes	%	±%
FG	François Asensi	10,598	35.64	+2.58
EELV	Stéphane Gatignon*	7,503	25.23	+22.75
UMP	Martine Valleton	5,373	18.07	−14.80
FN	Pierre-Antoine Lebeault	4,040	13.59	+8.17
DIV	Seid Ferrat	811	2.73	N/A
Others	N/A	1,412		
Turnout		29,737	47.93	−7.03
2nd round result
FG	François Asensi	16,078	100.00	+43.25
Turnout		16,078	25.91	−27.76
FG gain from PCF				

* Withdrew before the 2nd round

=== 2007 ===
Legislative Election 2007: Seine-Saint-Denis's 11th constituency
Party	Candidate	Votes	%	±%
PCF	François Asensi	10,509	33.06	−1.21
UMP	Martine Valleton	10,449	32.87	+10.40
PS	Christophe Borgel	5,467	17.20	+7.15
FN	Roger Holeindre	1,723	5.42	−10.48
MoDem	Yvon Kergoat	1,298	4.08	N/A
LV	Viet Tan Tran Tan	788	2.48	−0.19
Others	N/A	1,554		
Turnout		32,237	54.96	−5.28
2nd round result
PCF	François Asensi	17,464	56.75	−0.37
UMP	Martine Valleton	13,307	43.25	+0.37
Turnout		31,532	53.67	−1.72
PCF hold				

=== 2002 ===
Legislative Election 2002: Seine-Saint-Denis's 11th constituency
Party	Candidate	Votes	%	±%
PCF	François Asensi	10,486	34.27	+1.74
UMP	Martine Valleton	6,875	22.47	+2.50
FN	Roger Holeindre	4,865	15.90	−6.04
PS	Michèle Bouichou	3,077	10.05	−1.24
DIV	Jacques Oudot	1,567	5.12	N/A
LV	Lino Ferreira	817	2.67	−1.29
MPF	Dominique Bailly	802	2.62	N/A
Others	N/A	2,113		
Turnout		31,043	60.24	−4.14
2nd round result
PCF	François Asensi	15,749	57.12	−9.56
UMP	Martine Valleton	11,822	42.88	N/A
Turnout		28,542	55.39	−10.79
PCF hold				

=== 1997 ===
Legislative Election 1997: Seine-Saint-Denis's 11th constituency
Party	Candidate	Votes	%	±%
PCF	François Asensi	10,897	32.53	
FN	Roger Holeindre	7,349	21.94	
RPR	Jacques Oudot	6,691	19.97	
PS	André Touati	3,781	11.29	
LV	Jean-François Baillon	1,325	3.96	
LO	Sandra Rosendale	856	2.56	
Others	N/A	2,598		
Turnout		34,759	64.38	
2nd round result
PCF	François Asensi	21,699	66.68	
FN	Roger Holeindre	10,844	33.32	
Turnout		35,726	66.18	
PCF hold				
