= Darach Ó Séaghdha =

Irish writer, podcaster and activist (born 1977)

- Born: 20th century Rathfarnham
- Occupation: Writer, podcaster

Signature
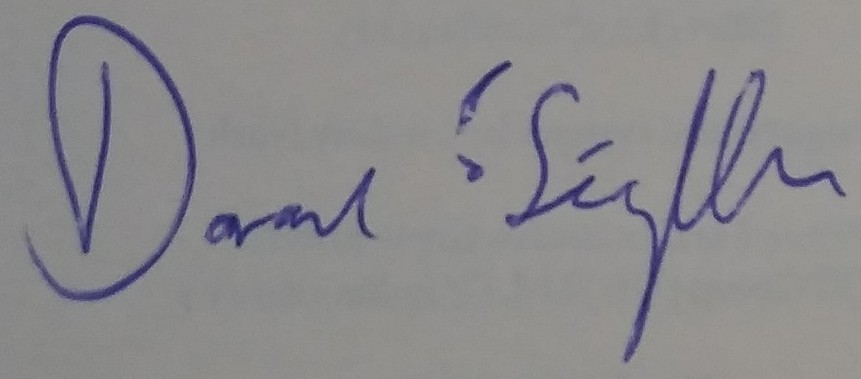

Darach Ó Séaghdha (pronounced [ˈd̪ˠaɾˠəx oː ˈʃeː]; born 5 November 1977) is an Irish writer, podcaster and Irish language activist. He is the author of Motherfoclóir: Dispatches from a Not So Dead Language, which won 'Ireland AM Popular Non-Fiction Book of the Year' in the 2017 Irish Book Awards.

== Biography ==
Ó Séaghdha grew up in Rathfarnham, a suburb of Dublin, in a multi-lingual household. His father, a linguist, and mother used to speak Irish together but spoke English to their children. When Ó Séaghdha's father became very ill, Ó Séaghdha became interested in learning Irish and used Twitter to share interesting Irish phrases and words he came across.

Ó Séaghdha describes Irish as "the amazing buried treasure". In his writing he wants to show people how they, through Irish, can make sense of the world around them, through words and phrases that do not exist in the English language. In the 2017 Irish Book Awards, his book Motherfoclóir: Dispatches from a Not So Dead Language (Head of Zeus, 2017) won the award for Ireland AM Popular Non-Fiction Book of the Year.

The follow-up to Motherfoclóir, published in 2018, which carries the name Craic Baby: Dispatches from a Rising Language, explores the very new and very old parts of the Irish language from a personal perspective, covering the topics multilingualism, Brehon Law, Gaelscoileanna and especially lexicon.

He runs the popular Irish-language-trivia Twitter account The Irish For. He is also the main host of the podcast Motherfoclóir, part of the Headstuff Podcast Network.
