= Are We Europe =

European independent magazine

Are We Europe is a non-profit media organization founded in Amsterdam in 2016. It publishes a print and online magazine, also called Are We Europe, and runs a foundation which supports cross border journalism in Europe. It has offices in Brussels and Amsterdam, and has a network of contributors across the European continent.

== History and structure ==
Are We Europe started as a blog in 2015 when Ties Gijzel, Kyrill Hartog, Marije Martens and Mick ter Reehorst, then students at Amsterdam University College, grew frustrated with the way traditional media covered European news and politics. In 2017, the group established an online magazine that published monthly issues with the help of contributors throughout Europe. They received grant funding through the Stimuleringsfonds voor de Journalistiek and the European Cultural Foundation, which allowed them to expand.

The print magazine was launched in 2018, initially published four times a year, and as of 2022 on a bimonthly schedule. The Are We Europe Foundation was established to encourage cross border journalism.

The organization received the third-place award in the European Charlemagne Youth Prize, awarded by the European Parliament and the International Charlemagne Prize Foundation, in 2017.

== Projects ==
During the first COVID-19 lockdown in 2020, Are We Europe produced an issue called The Silver Lining, which dealt with solidarity and local experiences of the pandemic in Europe. For the issue, it received a coverage grant from Solutions Journalism Network. The team also initiated the pop-up project Summer of Solidarity in 2020.
