= Grace Ly =

French writer

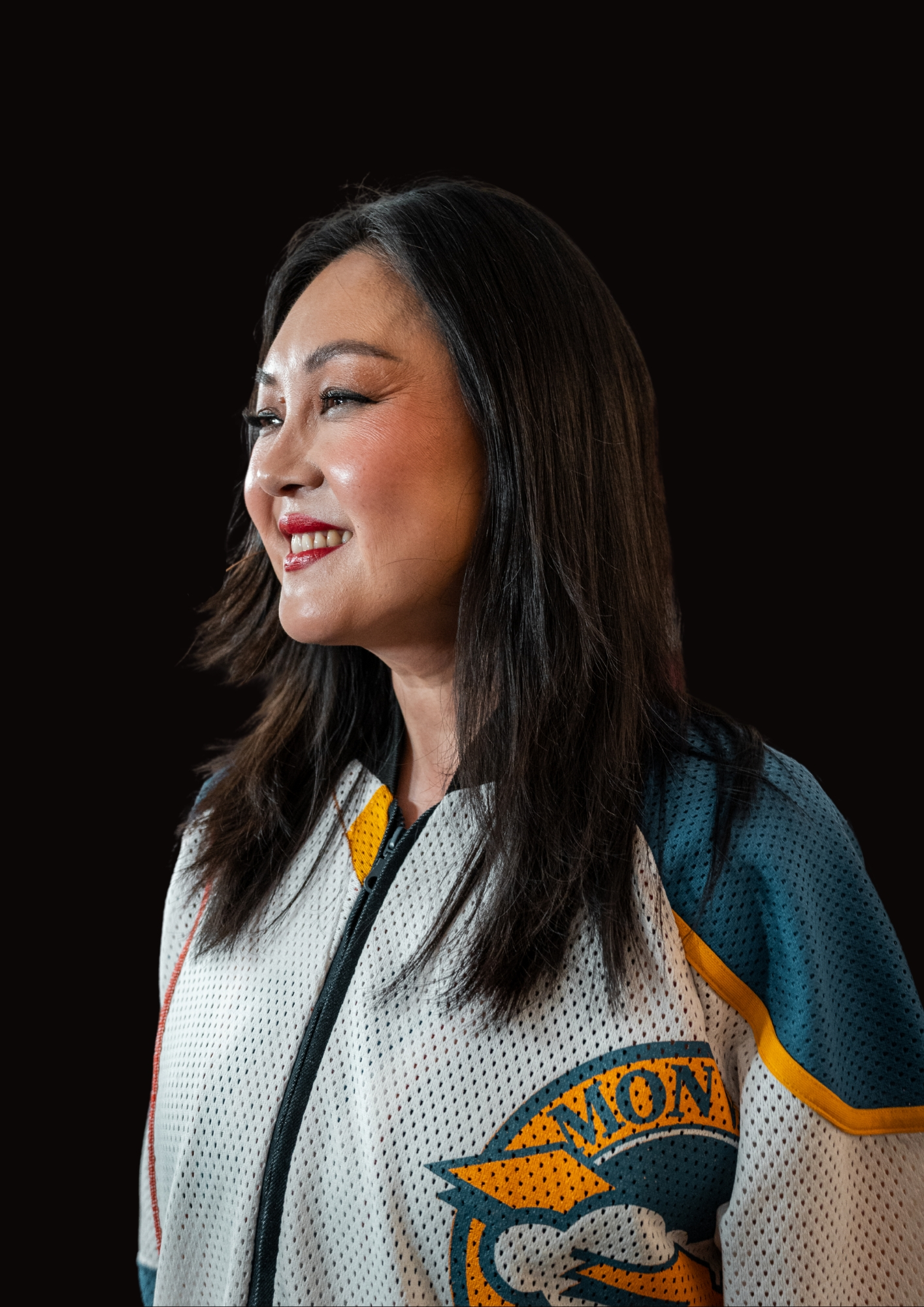
- Ly in 2025
- Born: 1979; Grenoble, France
- Occupations: writer, podcaster, activist
- Website: Grace Ly

Grace Ly (born in 1979) is a French writer, podcaster and anti-racist and feminist activist.

== Early life ==
Ly's parents are Cambodian Chinese. They fled the Cambodian Civil War and the Khmer Rouge regime and arrived to France in the 1970s. In Grenoble, her father initially ran an Asian food restaurant. Ly and her family were the only Asians in their neighborhood. When Ly was 6 years old, her family moved to Paris. Ly studied law.

== Focus on stereotypes about Asians ==
In 2011 Ly launched the blog Petite Banane (Little Banana) dedicated to food. The blog evolved from food to also discuss racial stereotypes that are associated with Asian food and East and South East Asian communities more broadly. This led Ly to launch the web-series Ça reste entre nous (It Stays Between Us), where French-Asian public figures discuss their heritage and how they experience their identities. In her work, Ly denounces the model minority myth and the corrosive effect of positive stereotypes often associated with the Asian community in France. Imitating accents is one form of casual racism that Ly considers as offensive. Ly's first novel Une jeune fille modèle (A model young girl) was published in 2018. The book is a work of fiction inspired by her personal story. In the book the main character, Chi Chi, progressively uncovers the hidden past of her family living in France, who fled the Khmer Rouge genocidal regime.

In 2023 Ly published the children’s book Est-ce que tu as faim ? (Are you hungry?) illustrated by Franco-Vietnamese artist Melody Ung. The story of young Anna-Yi is inspired by her grandmother who never told her "I love you" but constantly asked "Are you hungry?" and questions the many languages of love.

== Anti-racist work ==
In 2018 Ly launched the podcast Kiffe Ta Race (Pardon My Race in French) together with the French journalist Rokhaya Diallo. The podcast aims to encourage a public discussion on race. In France conversations on race are often suppressed under the pretext of expected colour blindness of the state. This is at odds with the lived reality of ethnic minorities in France, that face daily discrimination, discussed on Kiffe Ta Race. Ly and Rokhaya Diallo interview academics and thinkers to discuss the difficult relationship between the French state and race, which difficult relationship contributes to the marginalization of racialised minorities in the country. Ly denounced the alleged colour blindness of the French state, as a convenient framing to avoid taking stock of the rampant discrimination in the society. She calls the attitude arrogant.

== Contributions to public debates and literary events ==
Together with Hengameh Yaghoobifarah, she curated the 2021 edition of the Read My World Festival in Amsterdam. She spoke as a distinguished international guest at the following year’s edition in 2022 about motherhood. Ly is a frequent contributor to debates at academic institutions In France on the questions of racism and classism. Ly cites among her literary influences author Chimamanda Ngozi Adichie.
