= Patrick Gathara =

Kenyan blogger and author

- Born: Patrick Gathara; 1972 (age 53–54)
- Occupation: Blogger

Patrick Gathara (born 1972) is a Kenyan journalist, cartoonist, blogger, and author. He is also a regularly published commentator on regional and international affairs.

== Career ==
His work has appeared in multiple publications, including The Washington Post, Al Jazeera, and The Star.

Gathara is currently a curator for Kenyan news site The Elephant. He is also the author of Gathara Will Draw for Food, a collection of his political cartoons and commentary on the Kenyan political scene.

== Cartoon style ==
Gathara draws in pencil, preferring delicate shading to allow his subjects to emerge from the page rather than be defined by a series of strong ink lines. He focuses on faces, with his subject's foreheads narrowed, the cheekbones and jowls extended, and the ears exaggerated.
