= Clémentine Autain =

French politician and journalist (born 1973)

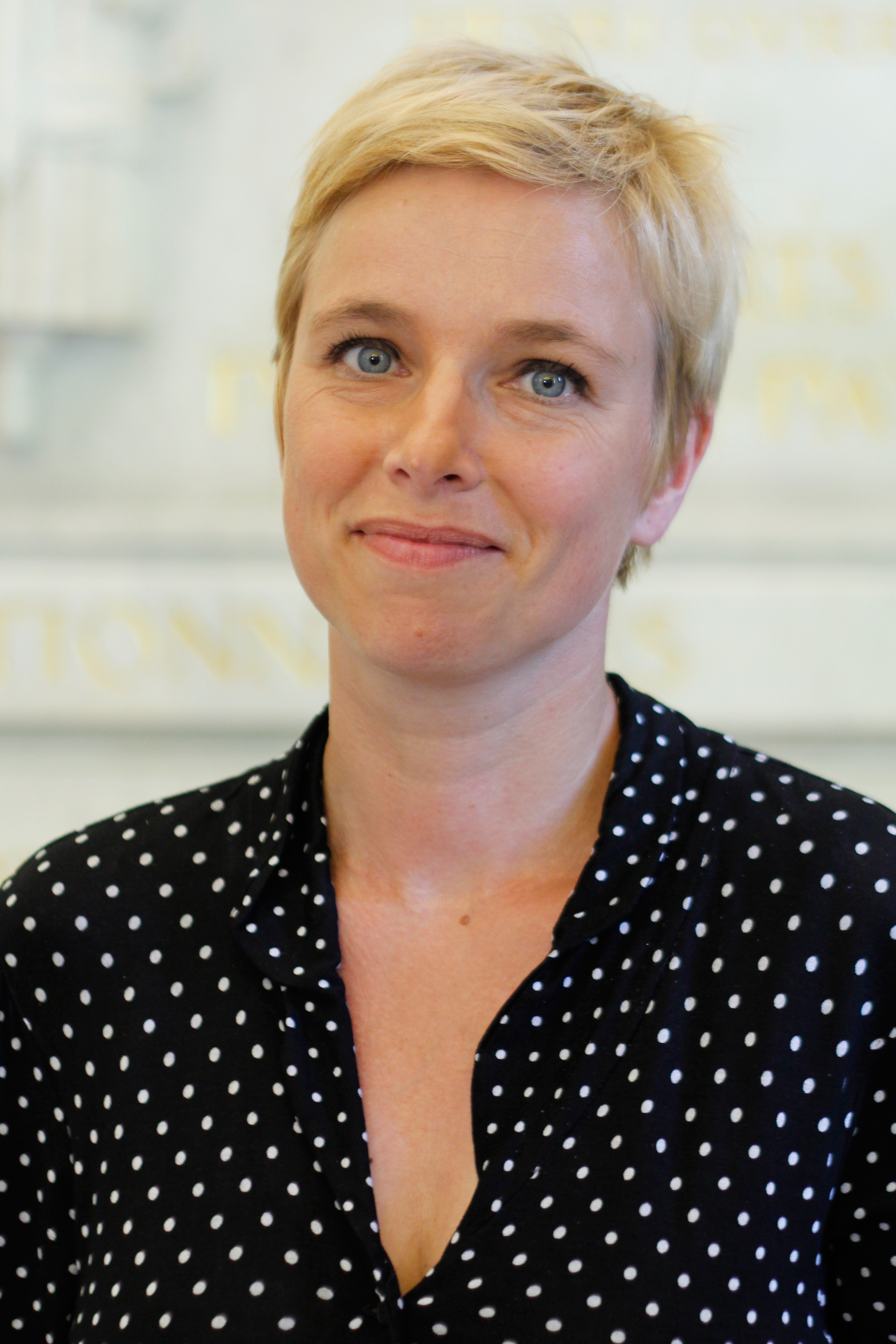
- Autain in 2017

Member of the National Assembly for Seine-Saint-Denis's 11th constituency
- Incumbent
- Assumed office 21 June 2017
- Preceded by: François Asensi

Personal details
- Born: 26 May 1973 (age 53) Saint-Cloud, Île-de-France, France
- Party: L'Après (2024–present)
- Other political affiliations: French Communist Party (until 2008); Federation for a Social and Ecological Alternative (2008–2013); Ensemble! (2013–2023); La France Insoumise (2016–2024); Ecosocialist Left (2022–2024)
- Parents: Yvan Dautin (father); Dominique Laffin (mother)
- Education: Paris 8 University

Clémentine Autain (French pronunciation: [klemɑ̃tin otɛ̃]; born 26 May 1973) is a French politician and journalist who has represented Seine-Saint-Denis's 11th constituency in the National Assembly since the 2017 French legislative election. Autain is the daughter of singer Yvan Dautin and actress Dominique Laffin. A feminist activist, she is co-editor of the monthly publication Regards with Roger Martelli and co-secretary of the Fondation Copernic, a "circle of reflection" critical of liberalism.

In the 2001 French municipal elections, Autain was elected to the Council of Paris for the 17th arrondissement with the support of the French Communist Party, where she served one term. As a councillor, she developed the Conseils de la jeunesse de Paris (Youth Councils of Paris). From 2001 to 2008, she held the title of Deputy Mayor of Paris under Bertrand Delanoë tasked with youth affairs. She was a member of the executive council of the Organisme d'habitations à loyer modéré and Offices publics d'aménagement et de construction, organisations responsible for the management of low-cost housing in Paris. In the 2014 French municipal elections, she was elected to the municipal council of Sevran, where she served again one term.

Autain has served as the Member of Parliament (MP) for the 11th constituency of Seine-Saint-Denis since 2017 as a member of LFI. She held a position in the Bureau of the National Assembly of the 15th legislature of the French Fifth Republic as a secretary. She also served as a regional councillor of Île-de-France since 2021, previously holding a seat in the regional council from 2015 until her resignation in 2017 to focus on her work as an MP.

== Early life and education ==
Autain was born in Saint-Cloud, the daughter of actress Dominique Laffin and singer Yvan Dautin. Her paternal uncle, François Autain, was a French senator and member of Parti de gauche (Left Party) for Loire-Atlantique, as well as former Deputy Mayor of Bougue and former Secretary of State for Immigration, Defense, and social security during the presidency of François Mitterrand. Her grandfather, André Laffin, a veteran of the Indochina Wars, was briefly elected as a right-wing candidate as a member of UNR in the department of Yonne. Her mother committed suicide in 1985, when Autain was twelve.

She has a son and a daughter, born in 2008 and 2010. As of 2022 she has written 15 books, including a novel, Assemblées. Autain studied history at Paris 8 University, earning a master's degree in history ("maîtrise"), with a specialisation in colonial Algeria, and a master's degree (Diplôme d'études approfondies, DEA) examining the Mouvement de libération des femmes (MLF).

== Political career ==
In 2001, the French Communist Party asked her to run at the top of the ballot in the 17th arrondissement of Paris against Françoise de Panafieu, which she described as a "big bourgeois woman" with "appalling class contempt". Winning with 35% of the vote, the new Mayor of Paris, Bertrand Delanoë, named her assistant in charge of youth. As a representative of the Paris municipality, in 2001 she attended the Universités d'été euroméditerranéennes des homosexualités, where she worried about possible discrimination towards militant bisexuals in the associations within the homosexual world, a "biphobia".

In 2003, she defended lesbians against the "phallocratic" tendencies of some members of gay associations. She denounced the threat that the Centre d'archives gay-lesbiennes de la mairie de Paris could neglect the "lesbian identity". In 2005, she signed the Appel des indigènes de la République, before ultimately withdrawing her signature when Tariq Ramadan added his own. During this period, she participated in activities organized by the Conseil représentatif des associations noires de France (CRAN). In the Group of 29 May, she campaigned against the 2004 Treaty of Rome, the European Constitutional Treaty, during the French referendum on the treaty. A frequent presence on television screens, in 2006 Clémentine Autain became a possible candidate for Gauche antilibérale.

She was declared ready to be a candidate in the 2007 French presidential election on 10 September 2006, at the meeting of the Collectif national d'initiative pour un rassemblement antilibéral de gauche et des candidatures communes where several local groups were in attendance, believing that she answered the needs of some militants for a candidate who did not represent any party, which gave her an advantage over Marie-George Buffet, Olivier Besancenot, Patrick Braouezec, Yves Salesse or José Bové "to synthesize". She participates in the Fondation Copernic, a club for discussions relating to the radical left and to leftist ideas: the RAP with Jacques Kergoat, SELS (Sensibilité écologiste libertaire et radicalement sociale-démocrate) or "Ramulaud" (a movement to develop an alternative to the left, named after a restaurant where it was launched). She has also contributed written pieces to L'Humanité. At the end of 2008 – beginning of 2009, she contributed to the creation of the Fédération pour une alternative sociale et écologique (FASE), a political movement whose objective is to "unite all the forces of transformation and transcendence of capitalism" and of which she is the spokesperson.

=== Reporting to Paris City Hall ===
As Deputy Youth Mayor of Paris from 2001 to 2007, Clémentine Autain developed the Conseils de la jeunesse de Paris (Youth Councils of Paris), operations charged with providing youth with opportunities for dialogue with elected officials, to contribute their perspectives on important initiatives driving the city (transportation, environment, housing, etc.) and to open projects up to the average Parisian. These operations distribute a budget of approximately 200,000 euros to the councils of the city's arrondissements and another 80,000 euros to the Conseils de la jeunesse de Paris. Thanks to a 50% increase in the budget directed at youth, Clementine Autain put in place different initiatives: Paris Jeunes Talents, Paris Jeunes Vacances, Paris Jeunes Aventures, Paris Jeunes Solidarité, which provide youth with activities such as job training, professional experience, and educational travel.

=== Reflection ===
After the setback of a planned unitarian antiliberal candidacy, Clémentine Autain decided not to engage in a disunited campaign that was establishing itself:

I made the fight for our coming together with the touchstone of my commitment, the key to my identification. It was to make this possible that I was declared a candidate in September. Getting involved in supporting those who will make one segment, necessary but a segment just the same, of anti-liberalism ... does not conform to what I actually did, said, or want to be ... It is not easy ..., when militancy is in the gut, to sit on a shelf instead of being part of a campaign. It is not exciting and it is not done among friends ... but in politics nothing is more important than consistency, over the long haul. I also prefer not to pretend and stay in synch with my deep conviction. I respect the choices of everyone. Mine is to stay true to what I have said and done to date: the convergence of the broader progressive left is my only compass. It does not guide us today, to the presidency. We are going tomorrow.

=== Controversy in Montreuil ===
In May 2007, Clémentine Autain left the 17th arrondissement in Paris for a new home in Montreuil in Seine-Saint-Denis, and sold her former apartment, which she had bought some years previously. Several months later, Clémentine Autain confirmed her intention to not run as a candidate in the 2008 Paris municipal elections. She expressed concerns about a possible alliance of Bertrand Delanoë with MoDem in Paris in the second round of municipal voting. She stated that she moved to Montreuil to "learn about the suburb". Before Clémentine Autain had even moved, there were rumours that she could reinforce the list headed by the outgoing Mayor, Jean-Pierre Brard, who like Autain, was linked with the communists. In reality, there was no substance to the rumours, the move to Montreuil corresponded above all with her personal choice and economic reasons. On her blog, Clémentine Autain confirms "she had asked nothing of the sort and nothing had been promised". Brard, who was ultimately defeated by Dominique Voynet, reaffirmed his opposition in principle. In part motivated by a desire to fight the "gentrification" of Montreuil, Clémentine Autain's arrival paradoxically comes in a context of strong social change in the previously more working class community. Living in Montreuil since early 2008, she cohosts a program focusing on political discussion, Paroles de gauche (Words from the Left) and supported the militants without papers during their strike.

=== The Nouveau Parti anticapitaliste ===
During 2008, Autain became involved with the Nouveau Parti anticapitaliste (NPA) (New Anticapitalist Party) under development, launched by the Ligue communiste révolutionnaire. Autain attended the national conference of l'Appel de Politis, a movement to create an alternative to the left. She called for "an acting out", making reference to the necessary creation of a new political force. However, this unity did not materialize. Clémentine Autain expressed regret that Olivier Besancenot and the NPA did not seek to build political majorities nor to work and create alliances with others, such as Jean-Luc Mélenchon.

Autain is active with Fédération pour une alternative sociale et écologique (FASE), for which she is spokesperson. In particular, she has represented FASE at the congress of the Parti de Gauche de Jean-Luc Mélenchon, indicating her desire to work with him despite differences on issues such as secularism, the Republic, the forms of political organisation or the concept of "revolution through the ballot box", to which she prefers that of "democratic revolution".

== Activism ==
Autain was raped at knifepoint near the Université de Paris VIII when she was 22. She first revealed this publicly in 2006. As the spokesperson for Jean-Luc Mélenchon in the 2012 presidential election, she disclosed this during the presidential pre-campaign as "a way to bring the issue of violence into the debate".

I do not deliver private confidences about what I felt, I do not have a desire to comment on the consequences of the rape in my private life. ... This part of the experience belongs to me, it will remain to me. ... But to talk is to be faithful to my commitment. Because silence is playing into the hands of the rapists. ... My example shows how rape is a taboo subject. My rapist was a repeat offender, he confessed to raping between twenty and thirty women, but only three complaints were filed. Rape is a phenomenon of considerable magnitude and severity, largely left in silence.

This rape marked, for her, the start of her engagement in feminism. She was active in the Union des étudiants communistes. She supported the Collectif contre le viol and contributed her feminist perspective. She made the Mouvement de libération des femmes (MLF) the thesis topic for her DEA in History. In 1997, she decided to create a new feminist organisation, Mix-Cité, for which she was co-president. The organisation is well known in France for its protests against the use of live models in the display windows of the shopping center Galeries Lafayette. She next worked as a parliamentary assistant to Georges Mazars, the Senator for the department of Tarn. She worked with Cécile Silhouette, a Paris councilor, who was elected as a representative of Ensemble pour une gauche alternative et écologiste. According to Le Monde, she would also have been close to the leftwing socialist current associated Jean-Luc Mélenchon. Recently, she became increasingly critical on Mélenchon.

== See also ==
- Mix-Cité
- Parti communiste français
- Regards

== Bibliography ==
- Anne Delabre, Clémentine Autain. Portrait, Danger public, novembre 2006. ISBN 2-35123-118-X
