= Hans Holten =

Norwegian newspaper editor

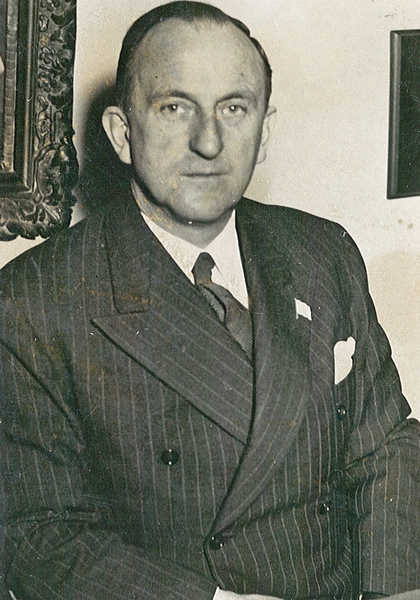
Hans Holten, c. 1938

Hans Holten (1892–1973) was a Norwegian newspaper editor.

He was born in Surnadal Municipality and was educated as an agronomist but became a journalist by occupation. From 1933 to 1940 he led the press office of the Agrarian Party, while also serving as secretary general. From 1945 to 1963 he was the editor-in-chief of Nationen. He was also a member of the Norwegian Language Council, representing Bokmål writers.

Media offices
Preceded by	Chief editor of Nationen; 1945–1963	Succeeded by Dagfinn Vårvik
