= Regards =

French monthly news magazine

- Editor: Rémi Duat
- Categories: News, photojournalism
- Frequency: Monthly
- Circulation: 25,000 (2005)
- Founded: 1932 - 1962, 1995 -
- Country: France
- Based in: Paris
- Language: French
- Website: regards.fr
- ISSN: 1160-8056
- OCLC: 473333625

Regards (also known as Regards Magazine or Revue Regards, trans: "Views") is a monthly French Communist news magazine published in Paris, France.

== History and profile ==
Created in 1932 as a Communist title, Regards is primarily known for photojournalism, and pre-dated other pictorial magazines such as Life (1936) and Paris-Match (1949). Regards was a periodical which launched photojournalism in the years before World War II. Leon Moussinac, critic and film theorist, a friend of Leon Delluc, runs the magazine. Robert Capa and Henri Cartier-Bresson are core photographers.

The magazine stopped publication in 1962, and then reappeared in 1995, under the leadership of the communist Henri Malberg. In 2000, it again reorganized under new management, trying to return to the original concept, of investigation of the world through photojournalism, surveys and contributions of intellectuals. According to the magazine's website, its modern readership is mainly composed of intellectuals and actors involved in social and political life.

After a second bankruptcy in October 2003, employees decided to create a "Scop" (société coopérative de production) or Cooperative. Roger Martelli and Clementine Autain ensure the direction of writing, and Pablo Pillaud-Vivien is the editor in chief.

== Disambiguation ==
The French magazine Regards should not be confused with the Belgian magazine Regards which is produced by the Belgian Jewish community.
