= Bondebladet (weekly) =

Weekly newspaper with a focus on farming in Norway

- Type: Weekly newspaper
- Format: Tabloid
- Owner(s): Norwegian Farmers' Union
- Publisher: Tun Media
- Founded: 1974; 51 years ago
- Language: Norwegian
- Headquarters: Oslo
- Country: Norway
- OCLC number: 1171481
- Website: Bondebladet

Bondebladet (Norwegian: The Farmers' Paper) is a weekly newspaper published in Oslo, Norway. The paper has been in circulation since 1974.

== History and profile ==
Bondebladet was established in 1974. The paper is the official organ of the Norwegian Farmers' Union. As of 1997 its publishers were the Norwegian Farmers' Union and the Norwegian Agricultural Co-operative Society. It is published by Tun Media on a weekly basis and is based in Oslo. Its target audience is the Norwegian farmers and the paper provides them with an opportunity to publish their advertisements. The weekly is published in tabloid format and is sent to the members of the Union and to other agriculture-related institutions.

Bondebladet had a circulation of 83,000 copies in 2003. The paper claimed a circulation of 63,479 copies and the readership of 110,000 in 2014.
