= Emma Holten =

Danish lecturer and feminist activist (born 1991)

Emma Holten (born 1991) is a Danish-Swedish feminist debater, online human rights defender. She is the editor of the Danish magazine Friktion and teacher at Krogerup, a folk high school in Humlebæk.

== Biography ==
Holten graduated from the University of Copenhagen with a master's degree in literary science.

She became famous in Denmark in 2014 when she took a stand against revenge porn. In 2011 Holten had naked pictures stolen from her and distributed over the internet without her consent. The harassment led her to becoming an activist for the right to privacy on the internet and a prominent voice in the Danish feminist debate. Holten contacted Danish photographer Cecilie Bødker to have new naked pictures taken of her, but this time with her consent. The project titled "Consent" was published in the Danish online magazine Friktion.

Since then, Holten has done projects focusing on gender-related violence, cyberbullying, revenge porn, and feminism. Among her projects are the 1800.plus project - 16 days of activism against gender-based violence, the Tedx Talk "Learning from revenge porn: Online rights are human rights", the video "Striving for Utopia" by The Why Foundation and several lectures on feminism, revenge porn and online rights.

In July 2016 RTL (German TV channel) did a story on Holten which featured the stolen naked pictures without Holten's consent. This led to a lawsuit and an apology and compensation was given from RTL to Holten.
