= Landkreditt =

Norwegian agricultural credit institution

Landkreditt Bank
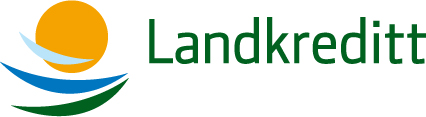
- Founded: 2002
- Headquarters: Oslo, Norway
- Net income: 91.4 mln NOK (2014)
- Total assets: 15.8 bln NOK(2014)
- Website: www.landkredittbank.no/

Landkreditt is a Norwegian cooperative financial group established in 1915.

The group consists of Landkreditt Bank, Landkreditt Forvaltning, Landkreditt Finans, Landkreditt Boligkreditt, Landkreditt Invest and Landkredittgården. Landkreditt Bank opened in 2002 as a self-service internet bank, with focus on both private- and businessmarket. Most of the business customers are part of the primary industry. The banks total assets is approximately 15,2 billion NOK.
