= Rijksmuseum =

National museum in Amsterdam, Netherlands

Coordinates: 52°21′36″N 4°53′07″E

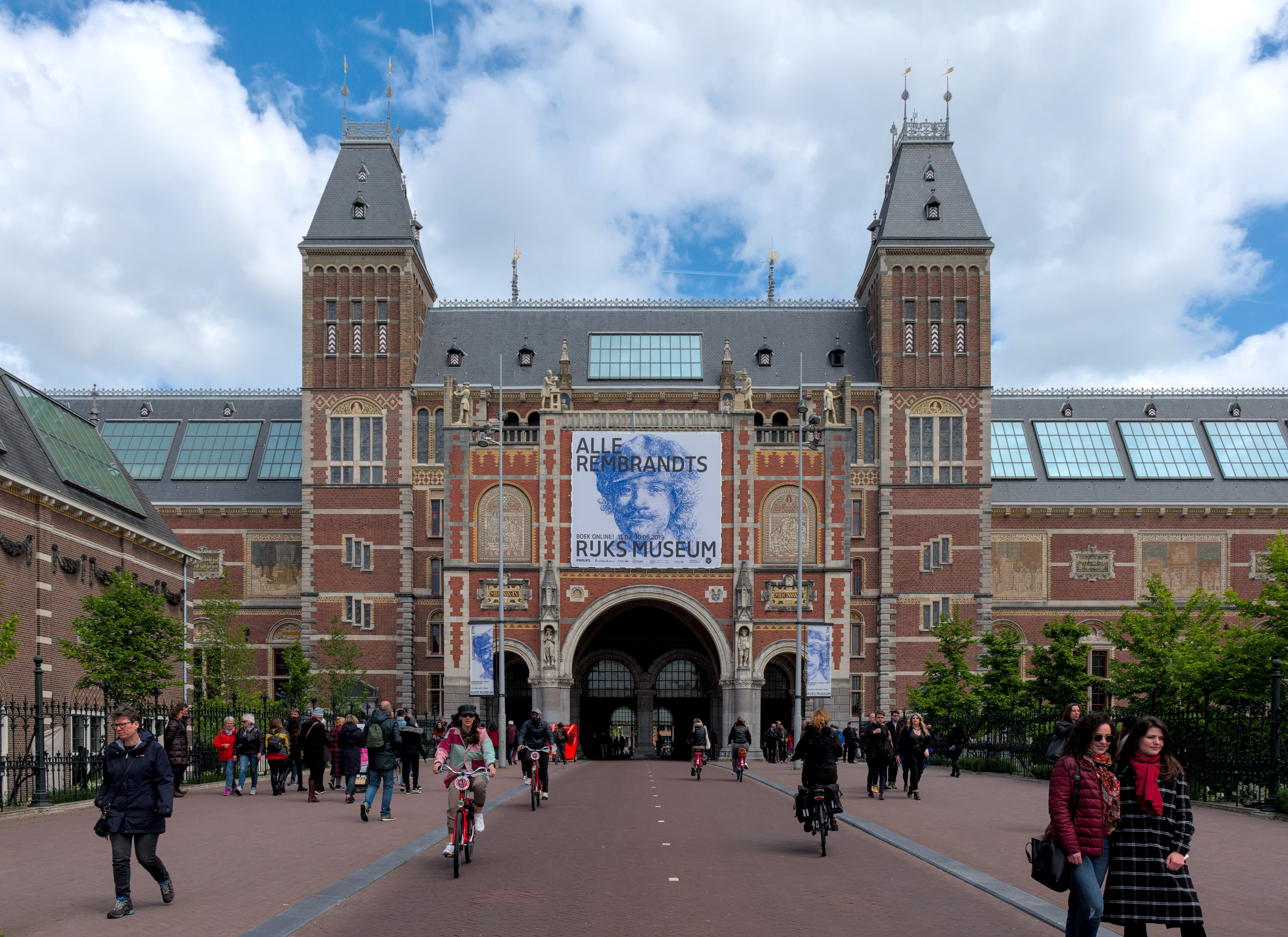
- Rijksmuseum at the Museumplein in 2019
- Established: 19 November 1798
- Location: Museumstraat 1 Amsterdam, Netherlands
- Type: National museum; Art museum; History museum
- Collection size: 1 million objects
- Visitors: 2,702,824 (2023)
- Director: Taco Dibbits
- President: Jaap de Hoop Scheffer
- Public transit access: Tram: 2 , 5 , 7 , 10 , 12 Bus: 26, 65, 66, 170, 172, 197
- Website: www.rijksmuseum.nl/en

The Rijksmuseum (Dutch: [ˈrɛiksmyˌzeːjʏm]) is the national museum of the Netherlands dedicated to Dutch arts and history, located at the Museum Square in the borough of Amsterdam South, close to the Van Gogh Museum, the Stedelijk Museum Amsterdam, and the Royal Concertgebouw.

The Rijksmuseum was founded in The Hague on 19 November 1798 and moved to Amsterdam in 1808, where it was first located in the Royal Palace and later in the Trippenhuis. The current main building was designed by Pierre Cuypers and first opened in 1885. On 13 April 2013, after a ten-year renovation which cost €375 million, the main building was reopened by Queen Beatrix. In 2013 and 2014, it was the most visited museum in the Netherlands with record numbers of 2.2 million and 2.47 million visitors. It is also the largest art museum in the country.

The museum has on display 8,000 objects of art and history, from their total collection of one million objects from the years 1200–2000, among which are some masterpieces by Rembrandt, Frans Hals, and Johannes Vermeer. The museum also has a small Asian collection, which is on display in the Asian pavilion.

== History ==
The collection of the Rijksmuseum was built over a period of 200 years and did not originate from a royal collection incorporated into a national museum. Its origins were modest, with its collection fitting into five rooms at the Huis ten Bosch palace in The Hague. Although the seventeenth century was beginning to be recognised as the key period in Dutch art, the museum did not then hold paintings by Frans Hals, Rembrandt, Jan Steen, Johannes Vermeer, or Jacob van Ruisdael. The collection was built up by purchase and donation. Napoleon had carried off the stadholder's collection to Paris; the paintings were returned to The Netherlands in 1815 but housed in the Mauritshuis in The Hague rather than the Rijksmuseum. With the founding of the Rijksmuseum in 1885, holdings from other entities were brought together to establish the Rijksmuseum's major collections.

=== 18th century ===
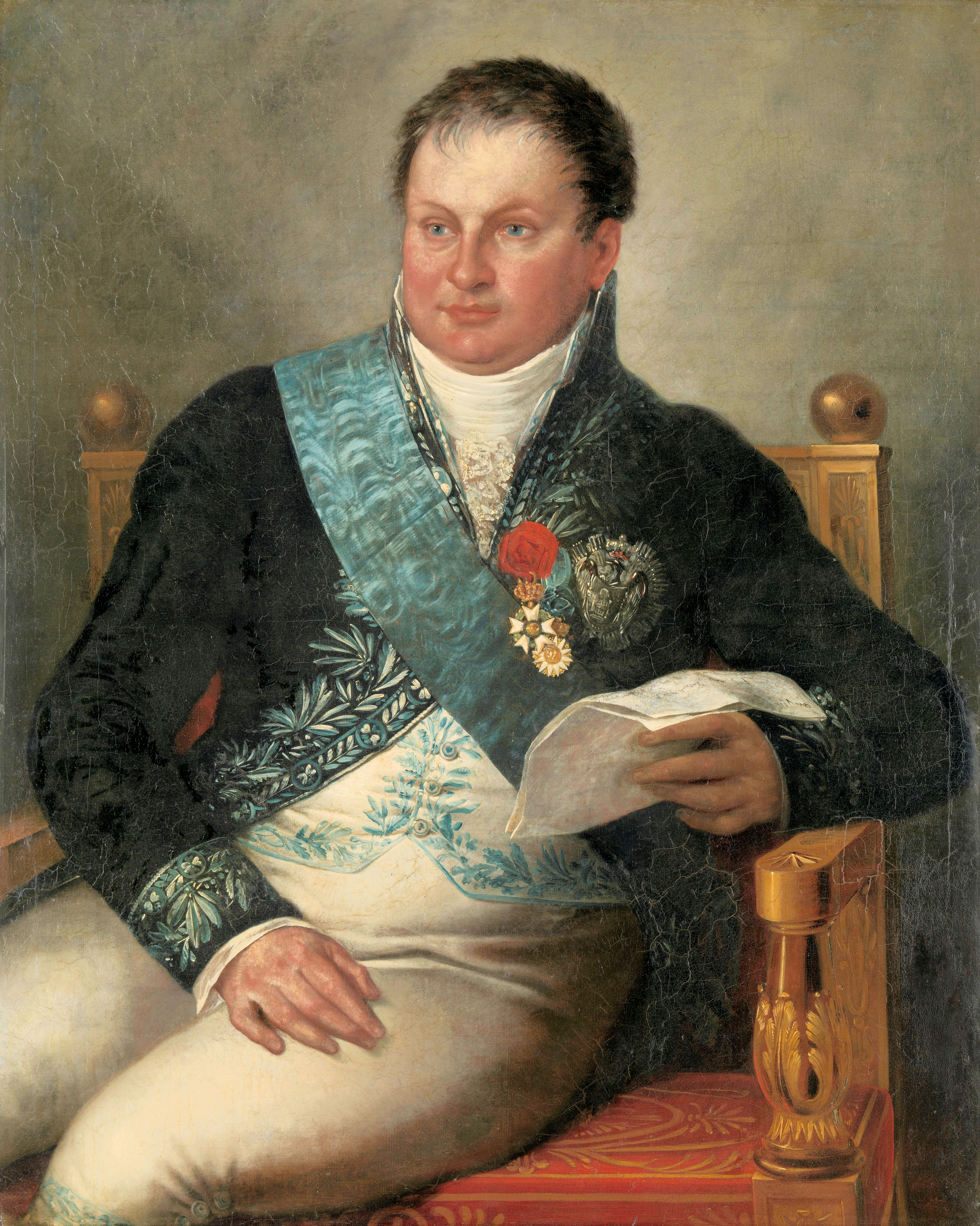
Isaac Gogel (1765–1821)

In 1795, the Batavian Republic was proclaimed; its Minister of Finance Isaac Gogel argued that a national museum, following the French example of The Louvre, would serve the national interest. On 19 November 1798, the government decided to found the museum.

=== 19th century ===
On 31 May 1800, the National Art Gallery (Dutch: Nationale Kunst-Galerij), precursor of the Rijksmuseum, opened in Huis ten Bosch in The Hague. The museum exhibited around 200 paintings and historic objects from the collections of the Dutch stadtholders.

In 1805, the National Art Gallery moved within The Hague to the Prince William V Gallery, on the Buitenhof. In 1806, the Kingdom of Holland was established by Napoleon Bonaparte. On the orders of king Louis Bonaparte, brother of Napoleon, the museum moved to Amsterdam in 1808. Paintings owned by that city, such as The Night Watch by Rembrandt, became part of the collection. In 1809, the museum opened in the Royal Palace in Amsterdam.

In 1817, the museum moved to the Trippenhuis. The Trippenhuis turned out to be unsuitable as a museum. In 1820, the historical objects were moved to the Mauritshuis in The Hague and in 1838, the 19th-century paintings "of living masters" were moved to King Louis Bonaparte's former summer palace Paviljoen Welgelegen in Haarlem.

"Did you know that a large, new building will take the place of the Trippenhuis in Amsterdam? That's fine with me; the Trippenhuis is too small, and many paintings hang in such a way that one can't see them properly."

— Vincent van Gogh in a letter to his brother Theo in 1873. Vincent himself would later become a painter and some of his works would be hanging in the museum.

In 1863, there was a design contest for a new building for the Rijksmuseum, but none of the submissions was considered to be of sufficient quality. Pierre Cuypers also participated in the contest and his submission reached the second place.

In 1876, a new contest was held and this time Pierre Cuypers won. The design was a combination of gothic and renaissance elements. The construction began on 1 October 1876. On both the inside and the outside, the building was richly decorated with references to Dutch art history. Another contest was held for these decorations. The winners were B. van Hove and Frantz Vermeylen for the sculptures, Georg Sturm for the tile panels and painting and W.F. Dixon for the stained glass. The museum was opened at its new location on 13 July 1885.

In 1890, a new building was added a short distance to the south-west of the Rijksmuseum. As the building was made out of fragments of demolished buildings, the building offers an overview of the history of Dutch architecture and has come to be known informally as the 'fragment building'. It is also known as the 'south wing' and is currently (in 2013) branded the Philips Wing.

=== 20th century ===
Dutch newsreel from 1959

In 1906, the hall for The Night Watch was rebuilt. In the interior more changes were made between the 1920s and 1950s – most multi-coloured wall decorations were painted over. In the 1960s exposition rooms and several floors were built into the two courtyards. The building had some minor renovations and restorations in 1984, 1995–1996 and 2000.

A renovation of the south wing of the museum, also known as the 'fragment building' or 'Philips Wing', was completed in 1996, the same year that the museum held its first major photography exhibition featuring its extensive collection of 19th-century photos.

=== 21st century ===
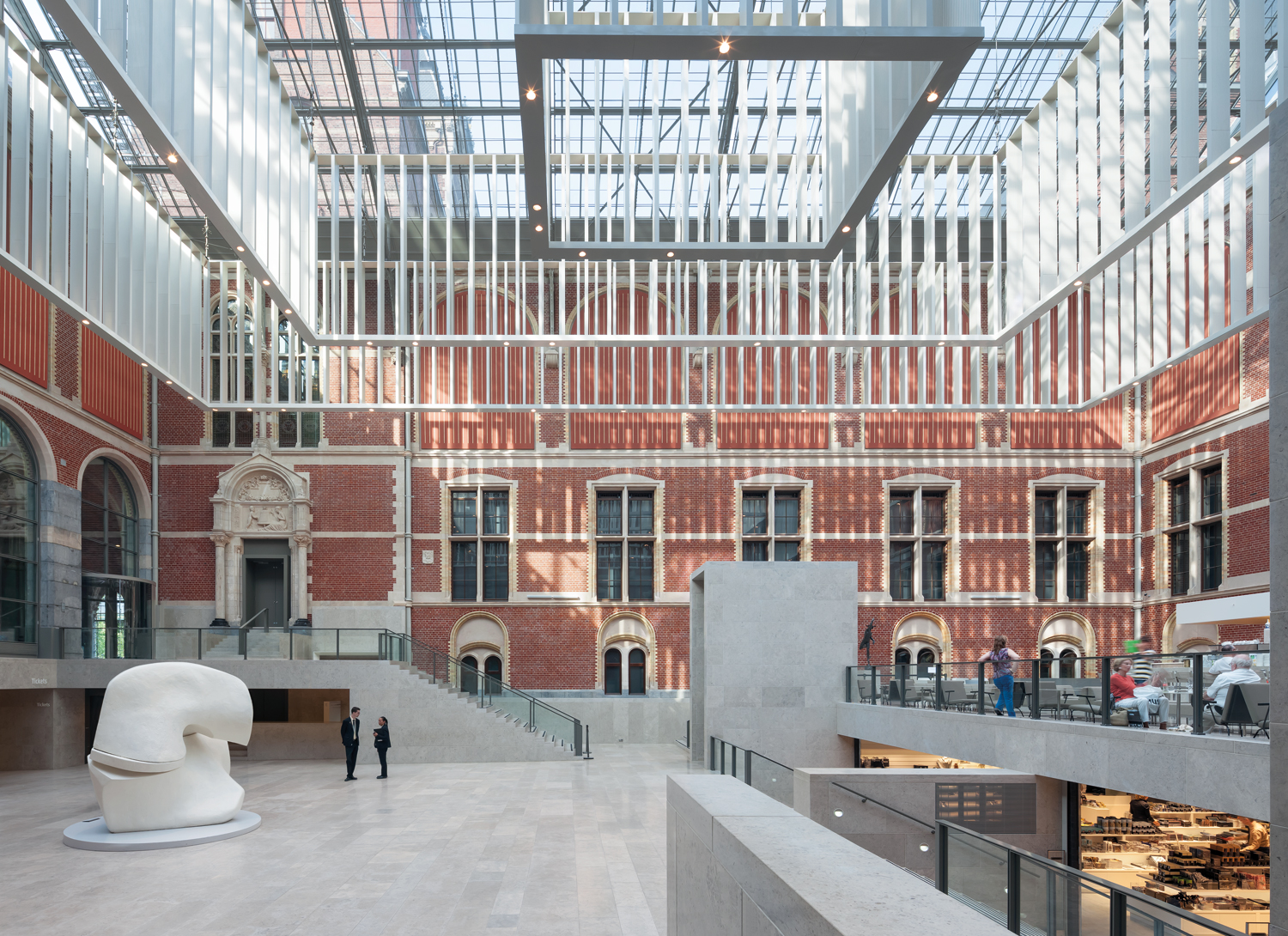
The atrium after the renovation in 2013

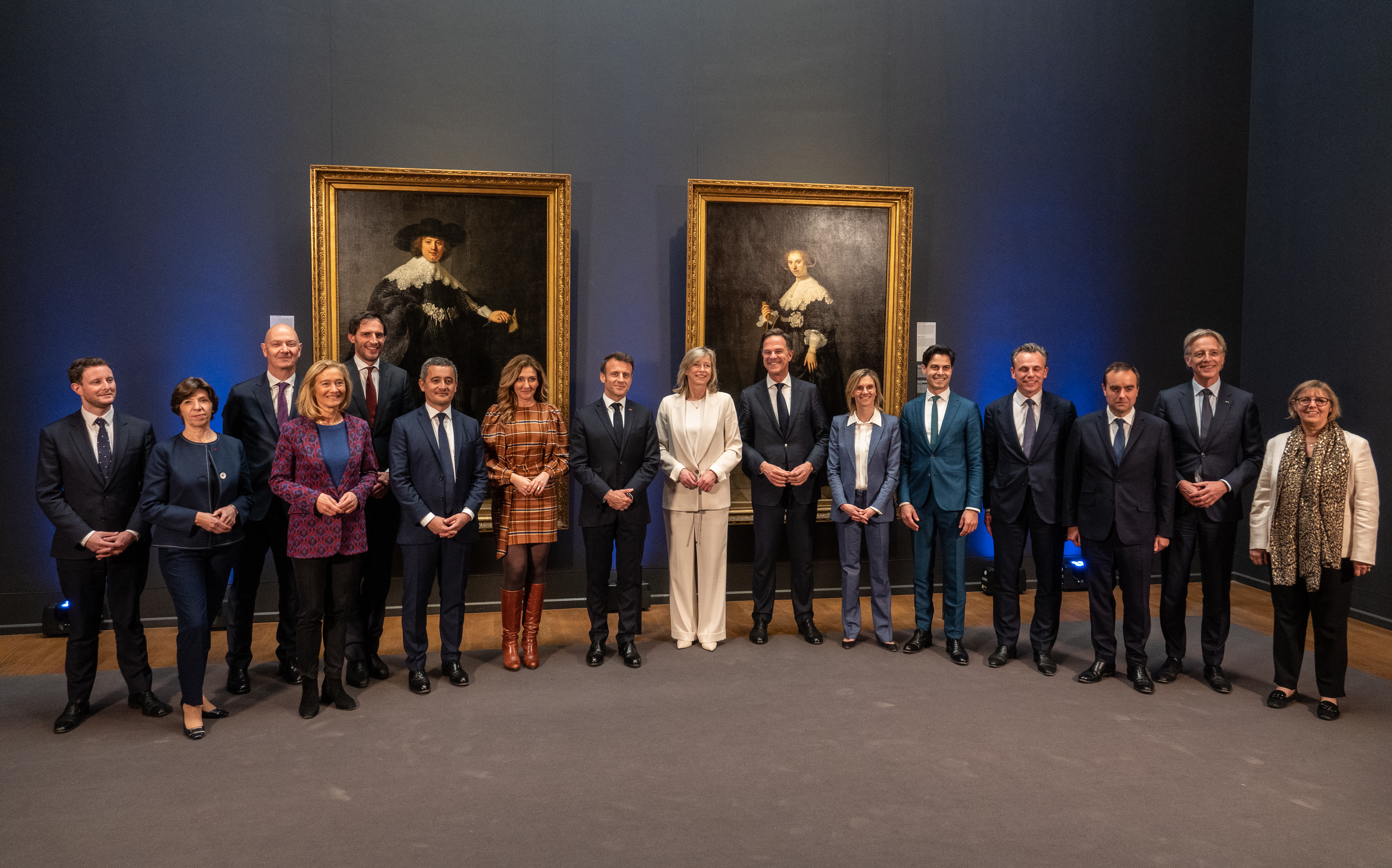
French President Emmanuel Macron with members of the French and Dutch governments at the Rijksmuseum in 2023

In December 2003, the main building of the museum closed for a major renovation. During this renovation, about 400 objects from the collection were on display in the 'fragment building', including Rembrandt's The Night Watch and other 17th-century masterpieces.

The restoration and renovation of the Rijksmuseum are based on a design by Spanish architects Antonio Cruz and Antonio Ortiz. Many of the old interior decorations were restored and the floors in the courtyards were removed. The renovation would have initially taken five years, but was delayed and eventually took almost ten years to complete. The renovation cost €375 million.

The reconstruction of the building was completed on 16 July 2012. In March 2013, the museum's main pieces of art were moved back from the 'fragment building' (Philips Wing) to the main building. The Night Watch returned to the Night Watch Room, at the end of the Hall of Fame. On 13 April 2013, the main building was reopened by Queen Beatrix. On 1 November 2014, the Philips Wing reopened with the exhibition Modern Times: Photography in the 20th Century.

In 2025, the Rijksmuseum announced plans to partner with the municipality of Eindhoven to build a satellite branch in Eindhoven; the branch will show works from the Rijksmuseum’s collection.

On 13 January 2026, the Rijksmuseum announced plans for a new sculpture garden with three pavilions and works by Henry Moore, Alberto Giacometti, and Louise Bourgeois, among others. The new garden will be funded by the Don Quixote Foundation, as well as providing long-term loans of works for the garden. The museum hopes it will open in autumn 2026.

=== List of directors ===
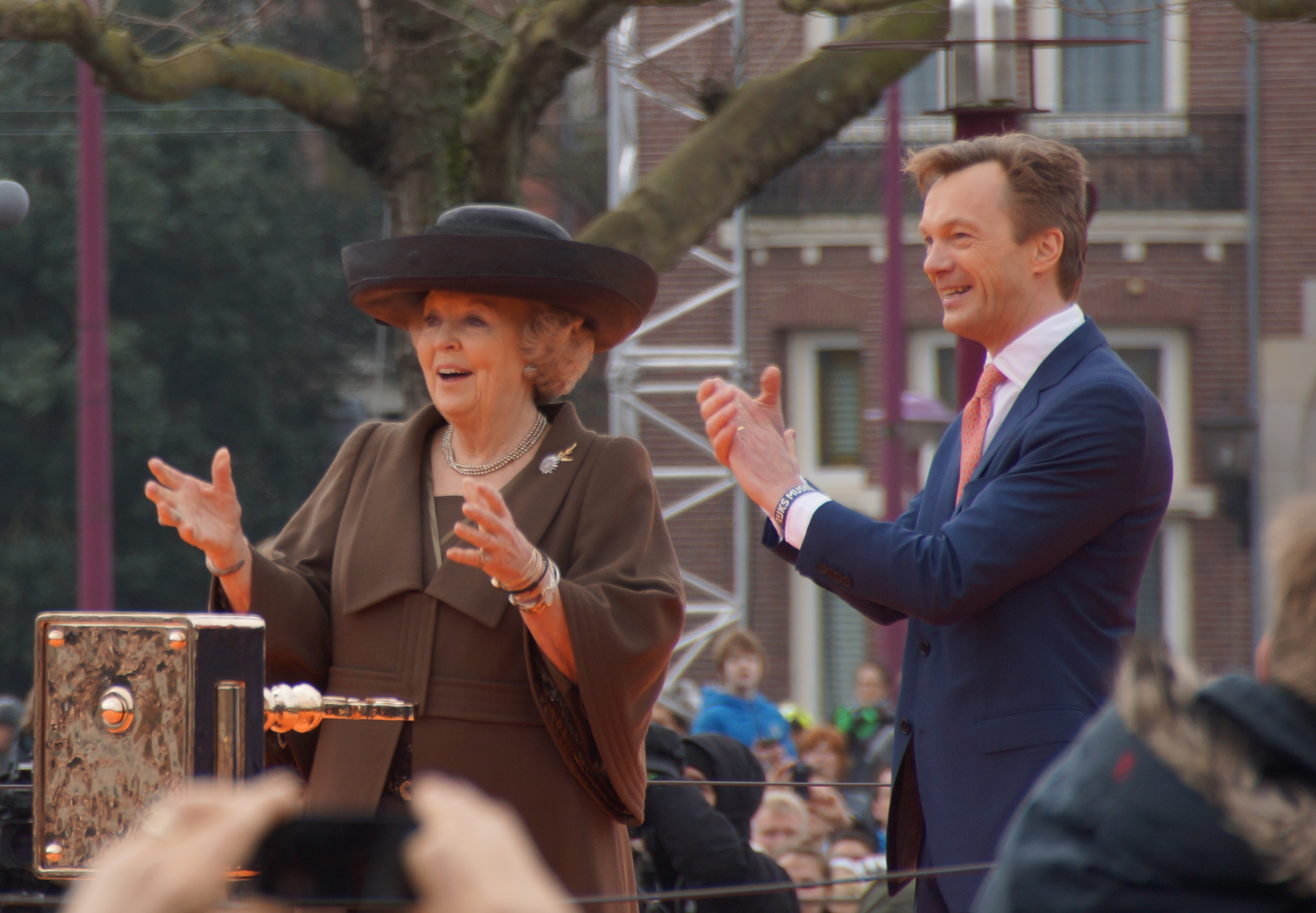
Queen Beatrix and museum director Wim Pijbes in 2013

- Cornelis Sebille Roos
- Cornelis Apostool (1808–1844)
- Jan Willem Pieneman (1844–1847)
- Johann Wilhelm Kaiser (1873–1883)
- Frederik Daniël Otto Obreen (1883–1896)
- Barthold Willem Floris van Riemsdijk (1897–1921)
- Frederik Schmidt-Degener (1921–1941)
- David Röell (1945–1959)
- Arthur F.E. van Schendel (1959–1975)
- Simon Levie (1975–1989)
- Henk van Os (1989–1996)
- Ronald de Leeuw (1996–2008)
- Wim Pijbes (2008–2016)
- Taco Dibbits (2016–present)

== Building ==
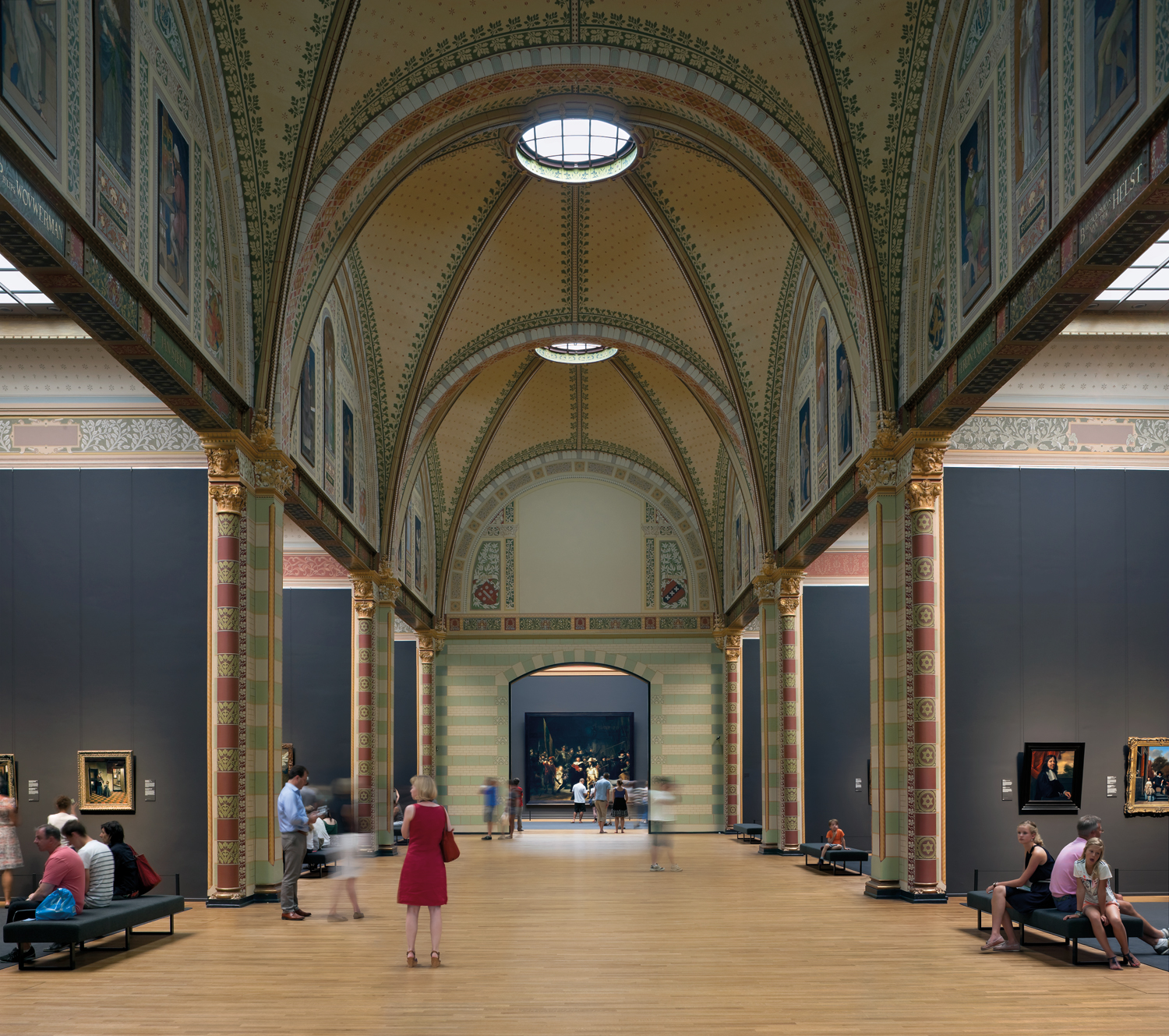
The Gallery of Honour

The building of the Rijksmuseum was designed by Pierre Cuypers and opened in 1885. It consists of two squares with an atrium in each centre. In the central axis is a tunnel with the entrances at ground level and the Gallery of Honour at the first floor. The building also contains a library. The fragment building, branded Philips wing, contains building fragments that show the history of architecture in the Netherlands. The Rijksmuseum is a rijksmonument (national heritage site) since 1970 and was listed in the Top 100 Dutch heritage sites in 1990. The Asian pavilion was designed by Cruz y Ortiz and opened in 2013.

According to Muriel Huisman, Project Architect for the Rijksmuseum's renovation, "Cruz y Ortiz always like to look for synergy between old and new, and we try not to explain things with our architecture". With the Rijks, "there’s no cut between old and new; we’ve tried to merge it. We did this by looking for materials that were true to the original building, resulting in a kind of silent architecture."

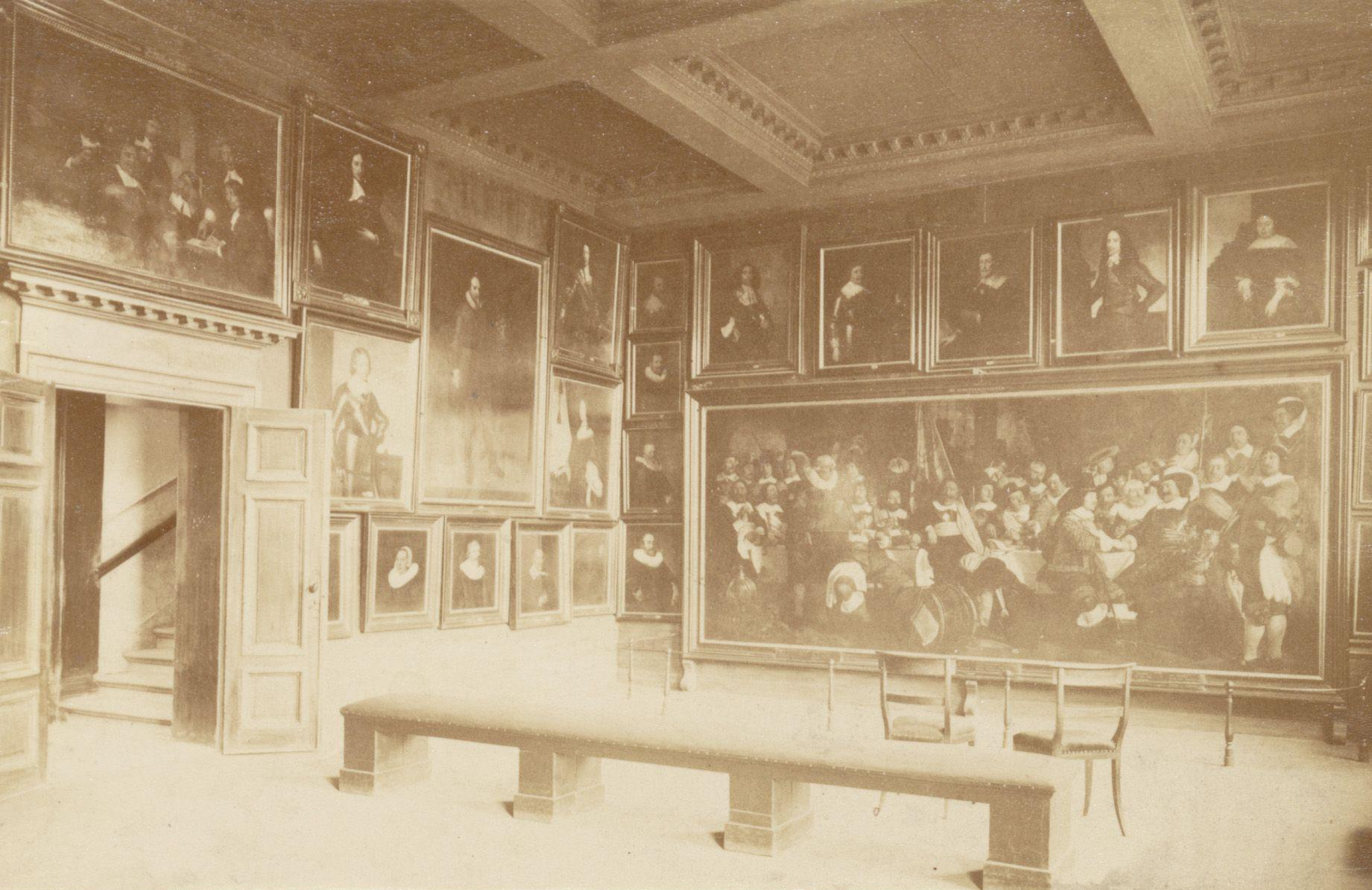
The Rijksmuseum was located in the Trippenhuis between 1817 and 1885.

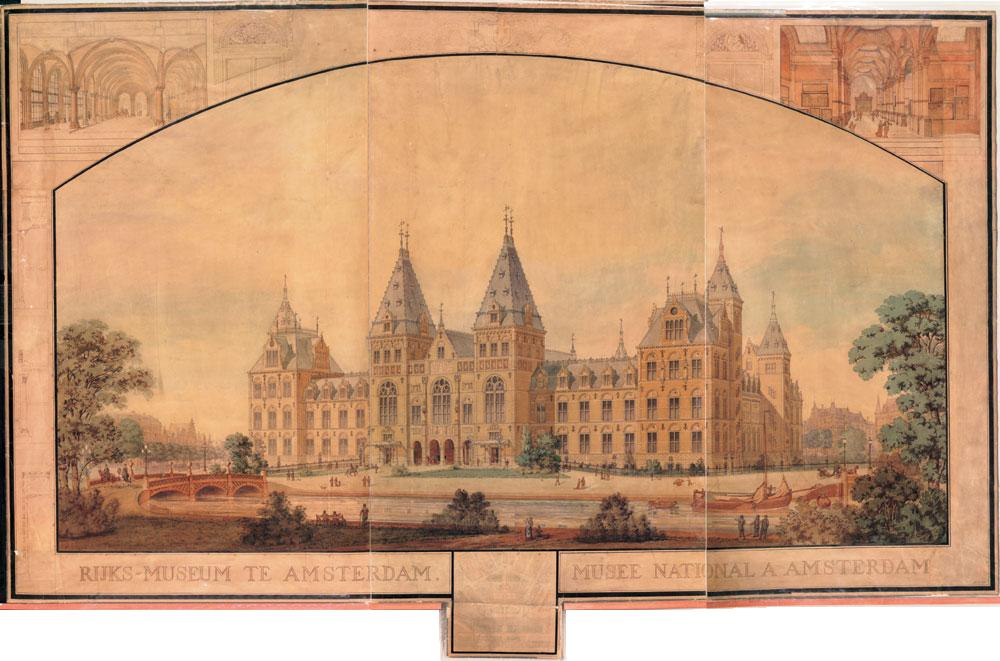
Drawing of the design by Pierre Cuypers in 1876.

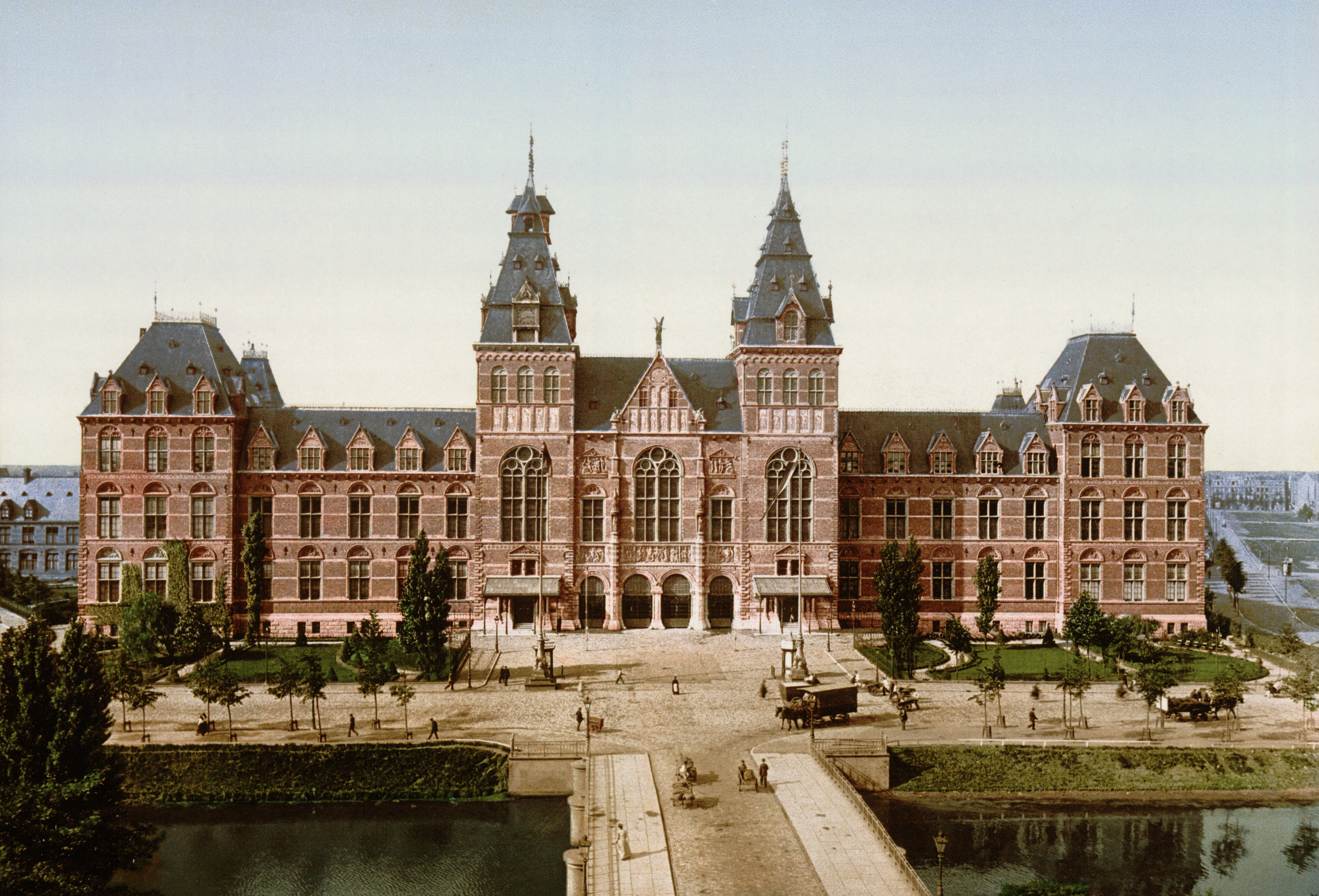
Front of Cuypers' building, circa 1895.

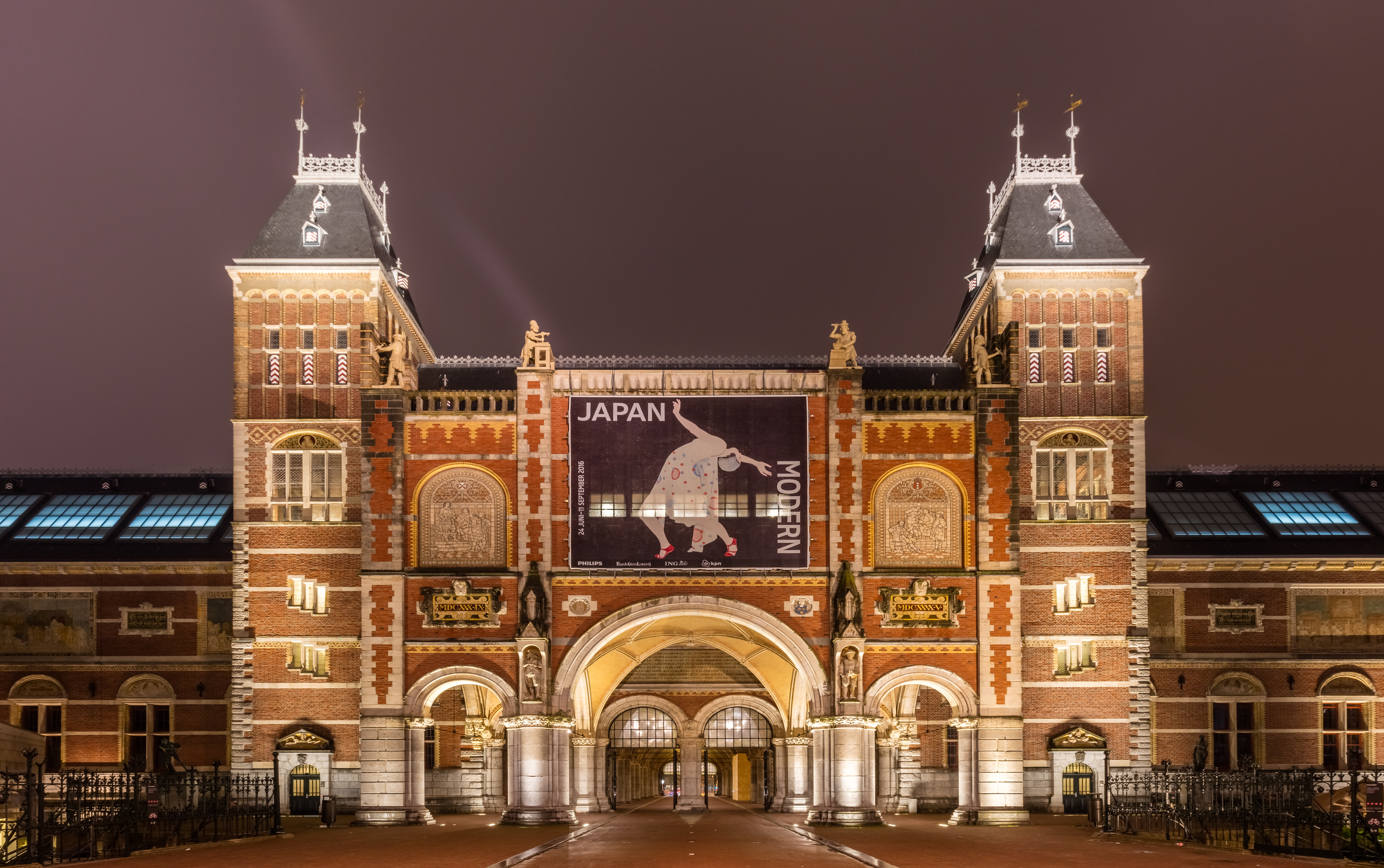
View of the façade by night.

Video of the Rijksmuseum (2016).

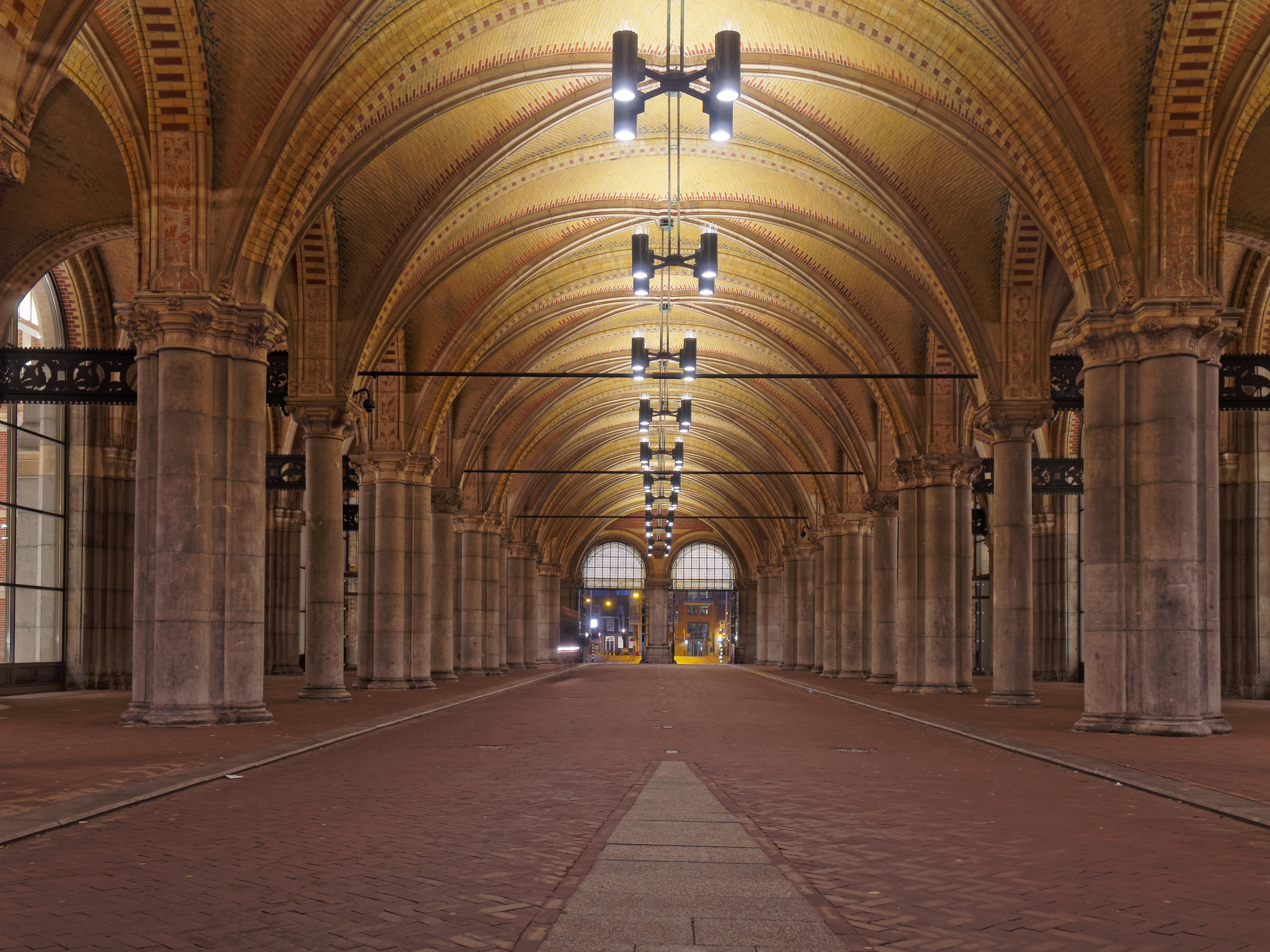
The Passage of the Rijksmuseum, the Passage is also used as a bicycle tunnel.

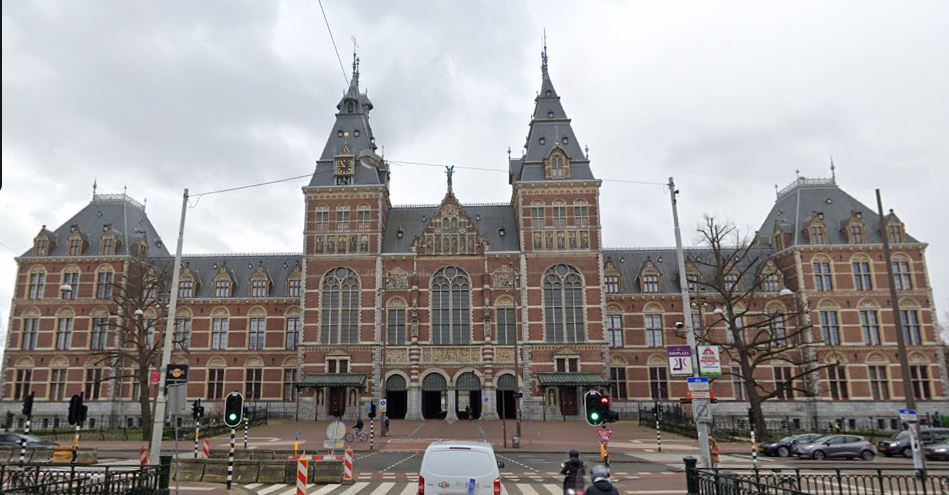
The front of the Rijksmuseum in 2024.

== Collection ==
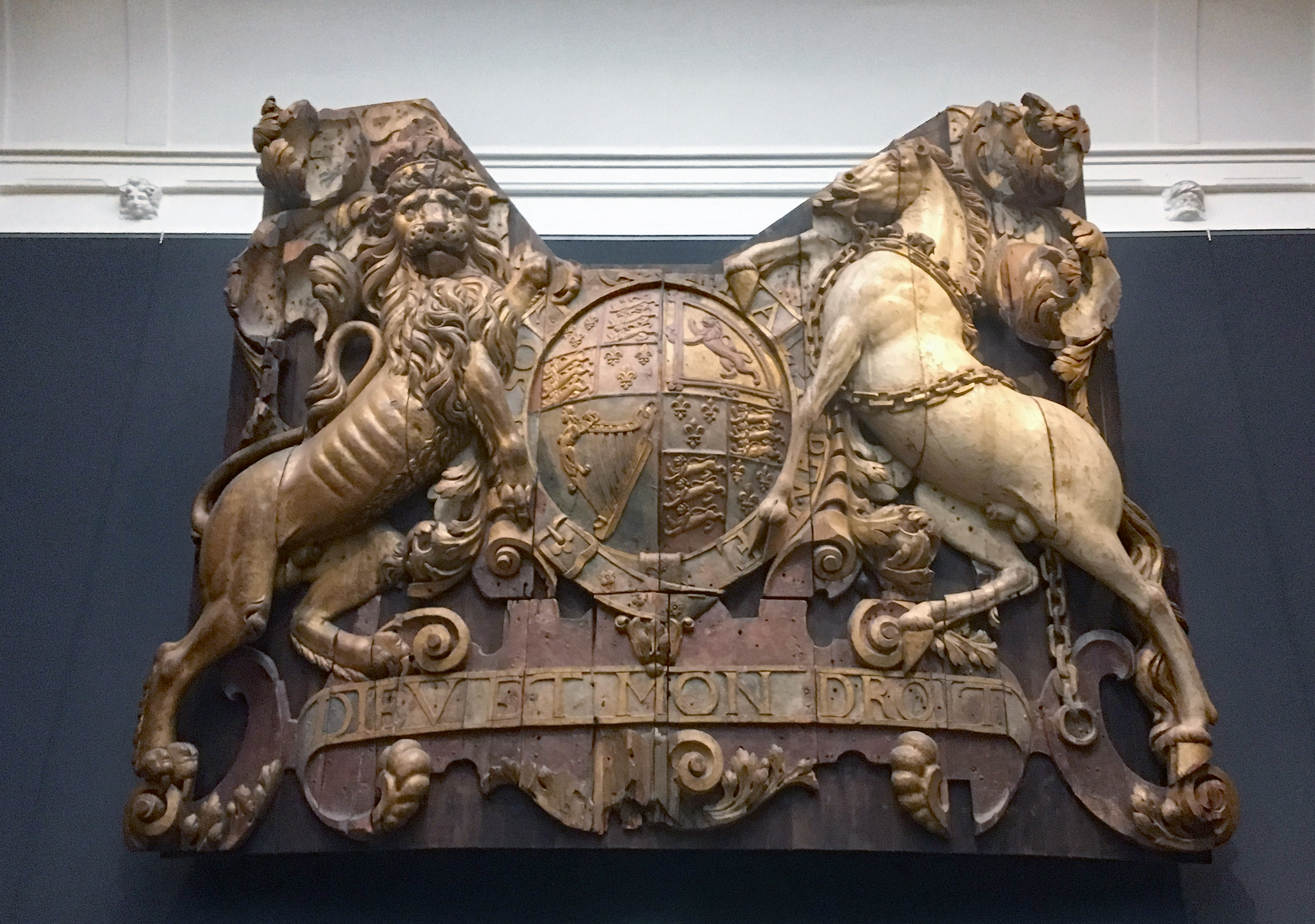
Royal crest from the stern of the Royal Charles

The collection of the Rijksmuseum consists of 1 million objects and is dedicated to arts, crafts, and history from the years 1200 to 2000. Around 8,000 objects are currently on display in the museum.

The collection contains more than 2,000 paintings from the Dutch Golden Age by notable painters such as Jacob van Ruisdael, Frans Hals, Johannes Vermeer, Jan Steen, Rembrandt, and Rembrandt's pupils.

The museum also has a small Asian collection which is on display in the Asian pavilion.

Some of the more unusual items in the collection include the royal crest from the stern of HMS Royal Charles which was captured in the Raid on the Medway, the Hartog plate and the FK35 Bantam biplane.

In 2012, the museum made some 125,000 high-resolution images available for download via its Rijksstudio webplatform, with plans to add another 40,000 images per year until the entire collection of one million works is available, according to Taco Dibbits, director of collections. As of January 2021, the Rijksstudio hosts 700,000 works, available under a Creative Commons 1.0 Universal license, essentially copyright-free and royalty-free.

== Gallery ==
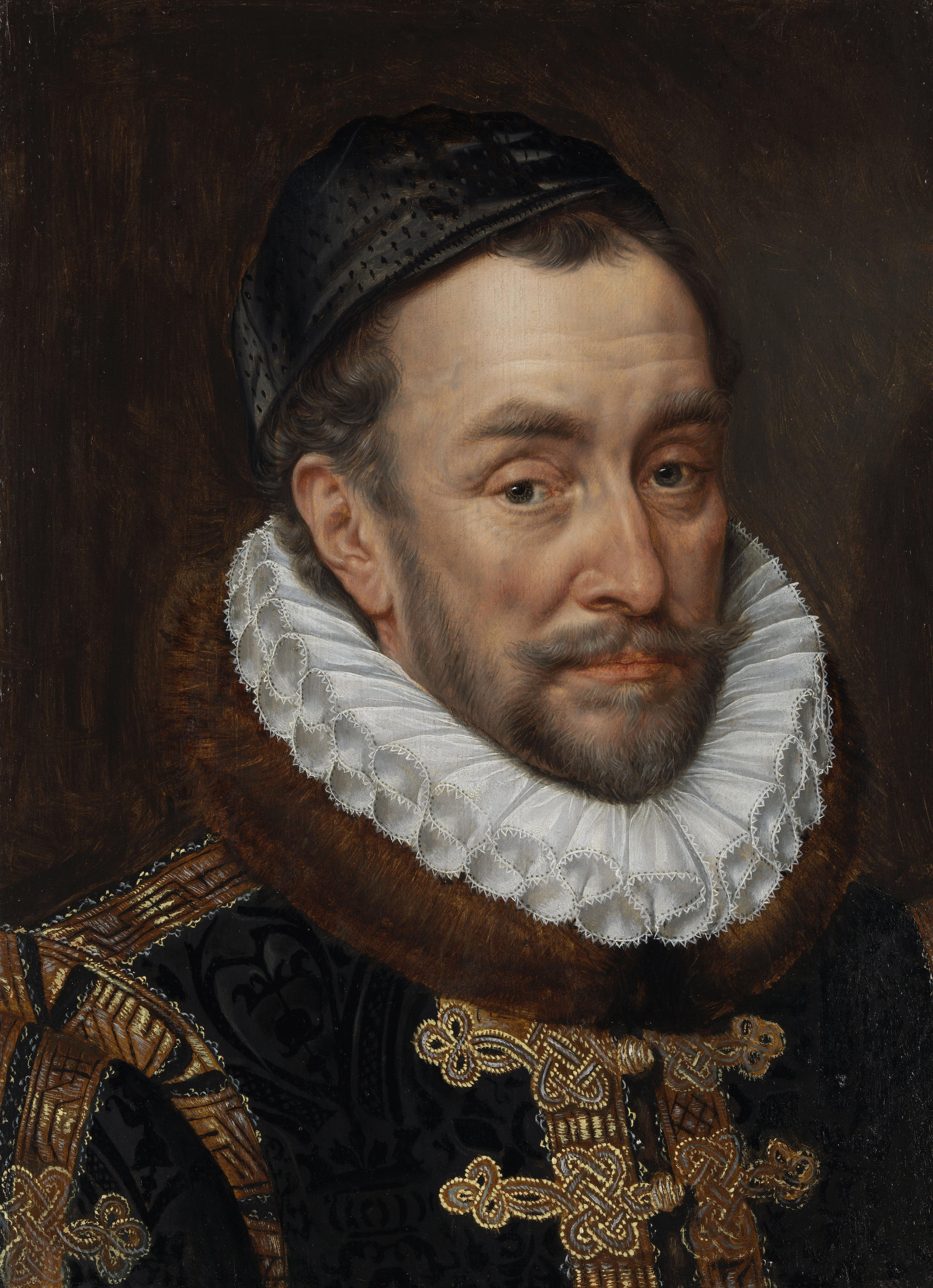
Portrait of William of Orange (1579) by Adriaen Thomasz Key

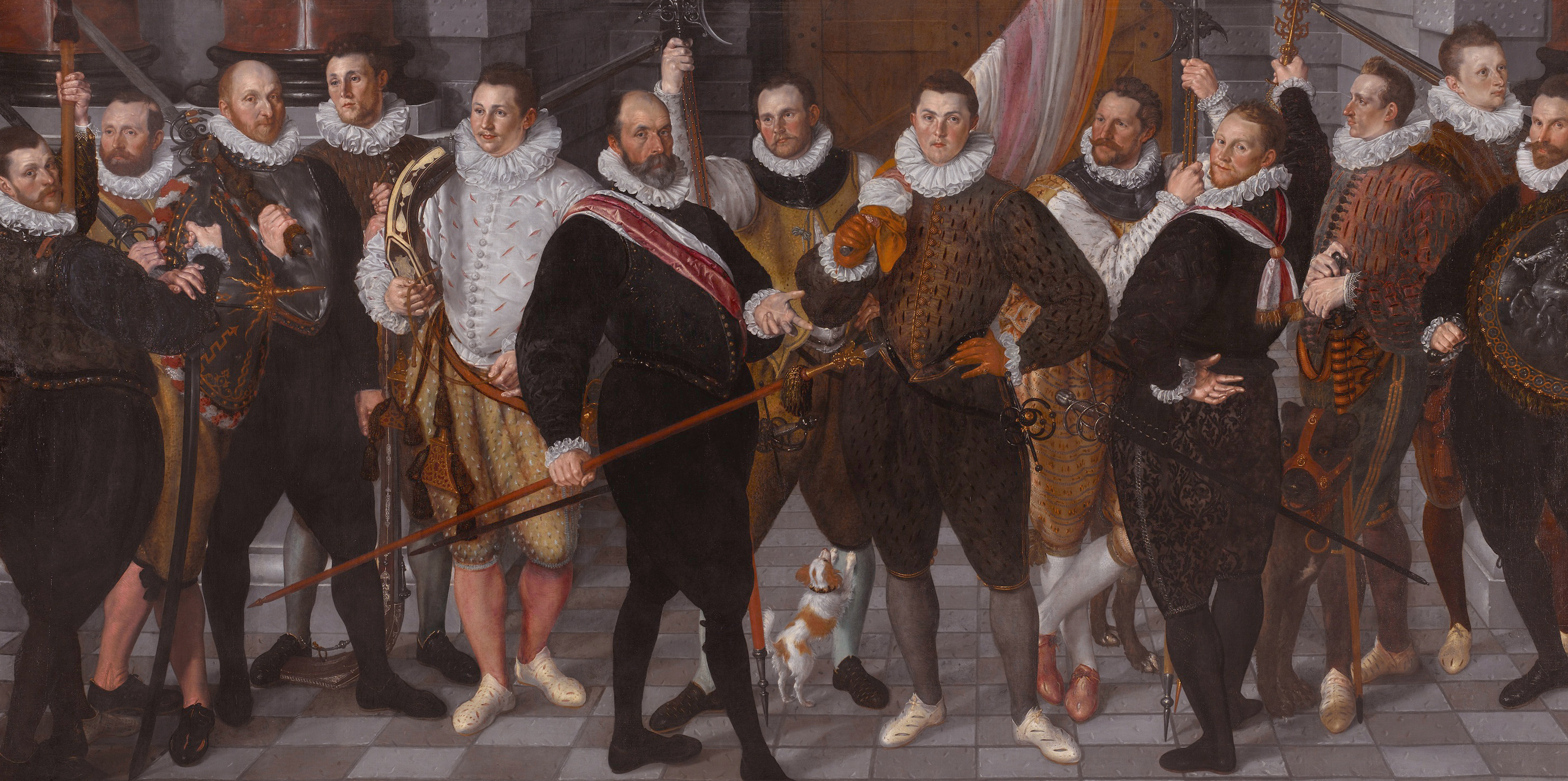
The Company of Captain Dirck Jacobsz Rosecrans and Lieutenant Pauw (1588) by Cornelis Ketel

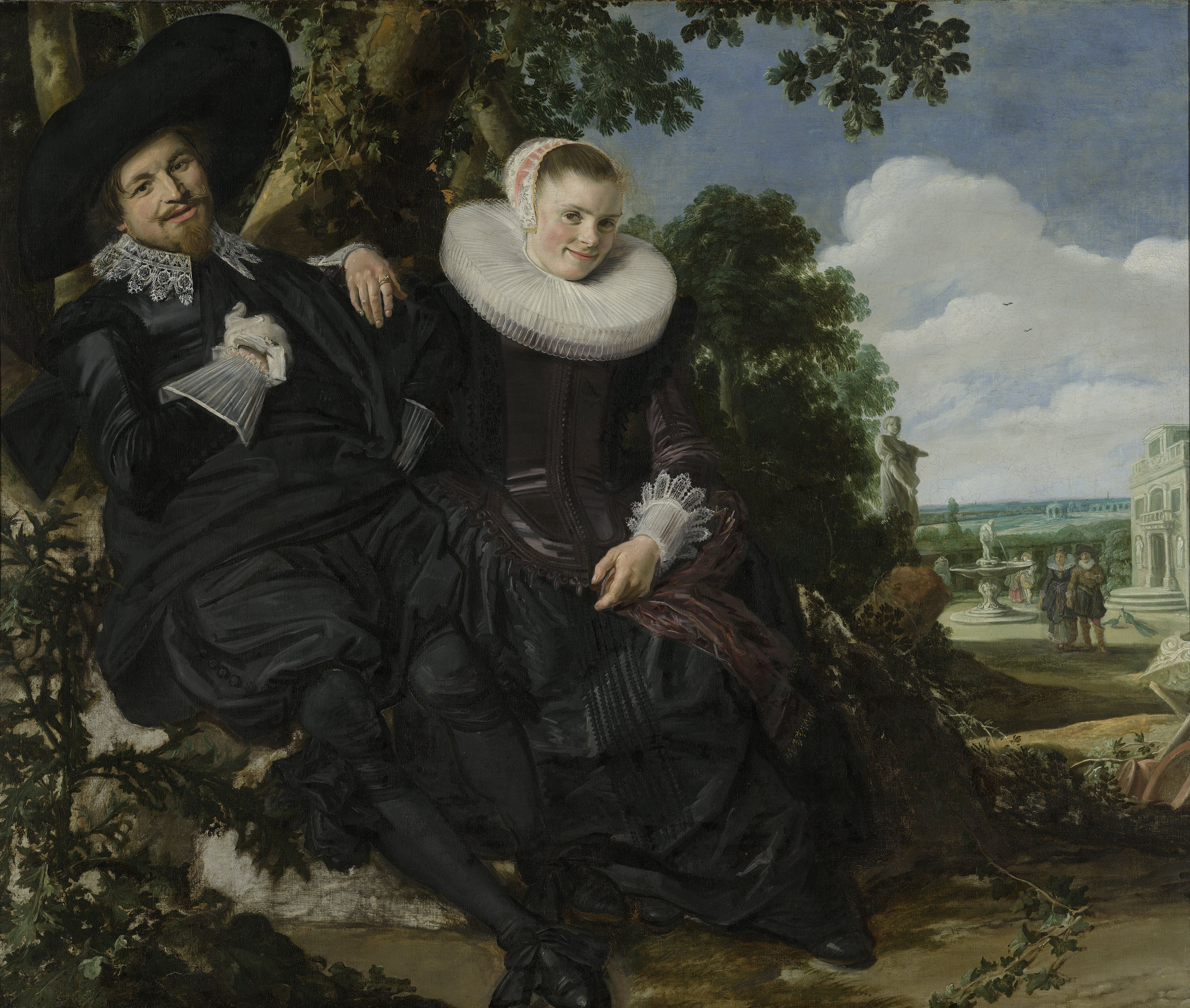
Portrait of a Young Couple (1622) by Frans Hals

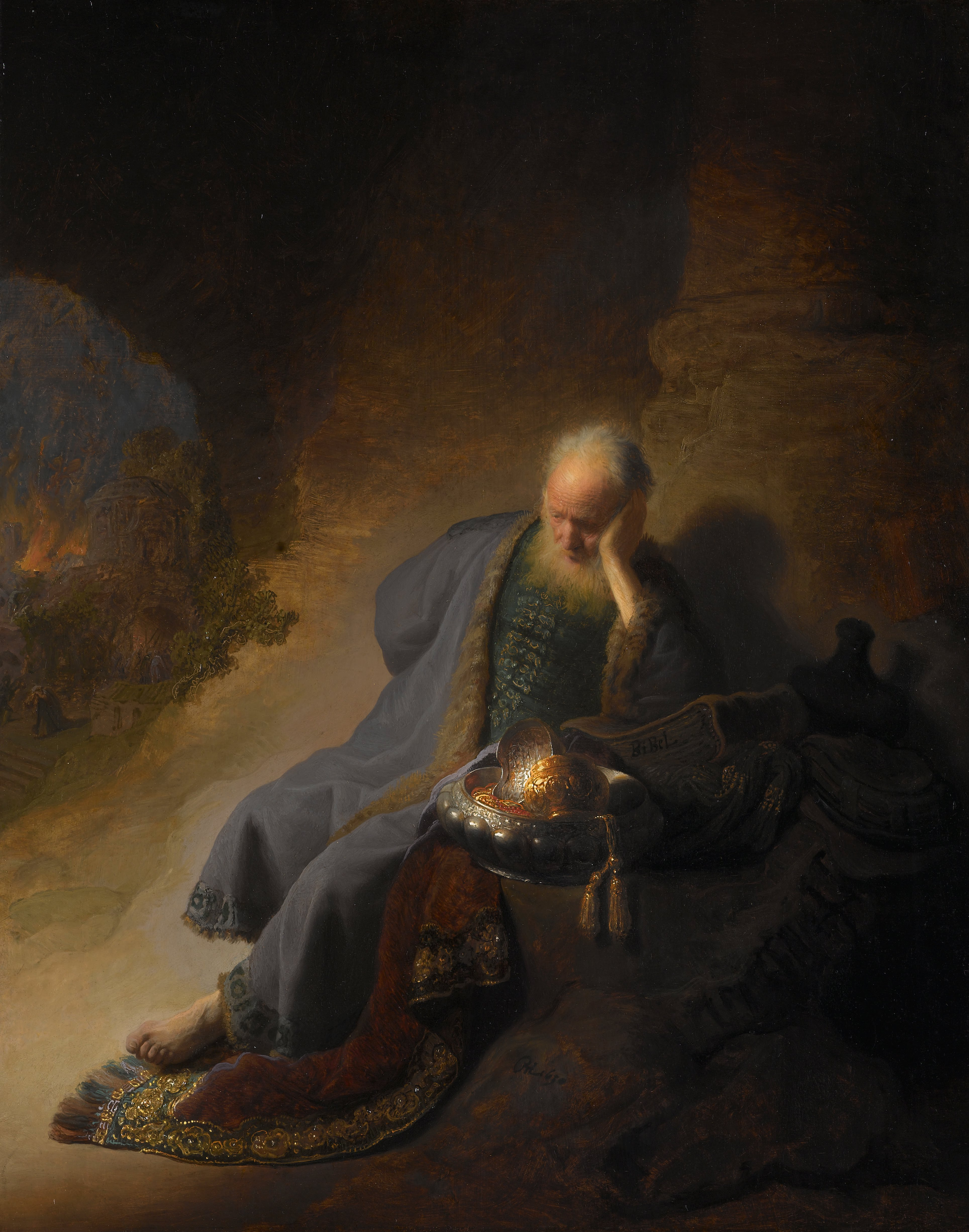
Jeremiah Lamenting the Destruction of Jerusalem (1630) by Rembrandt

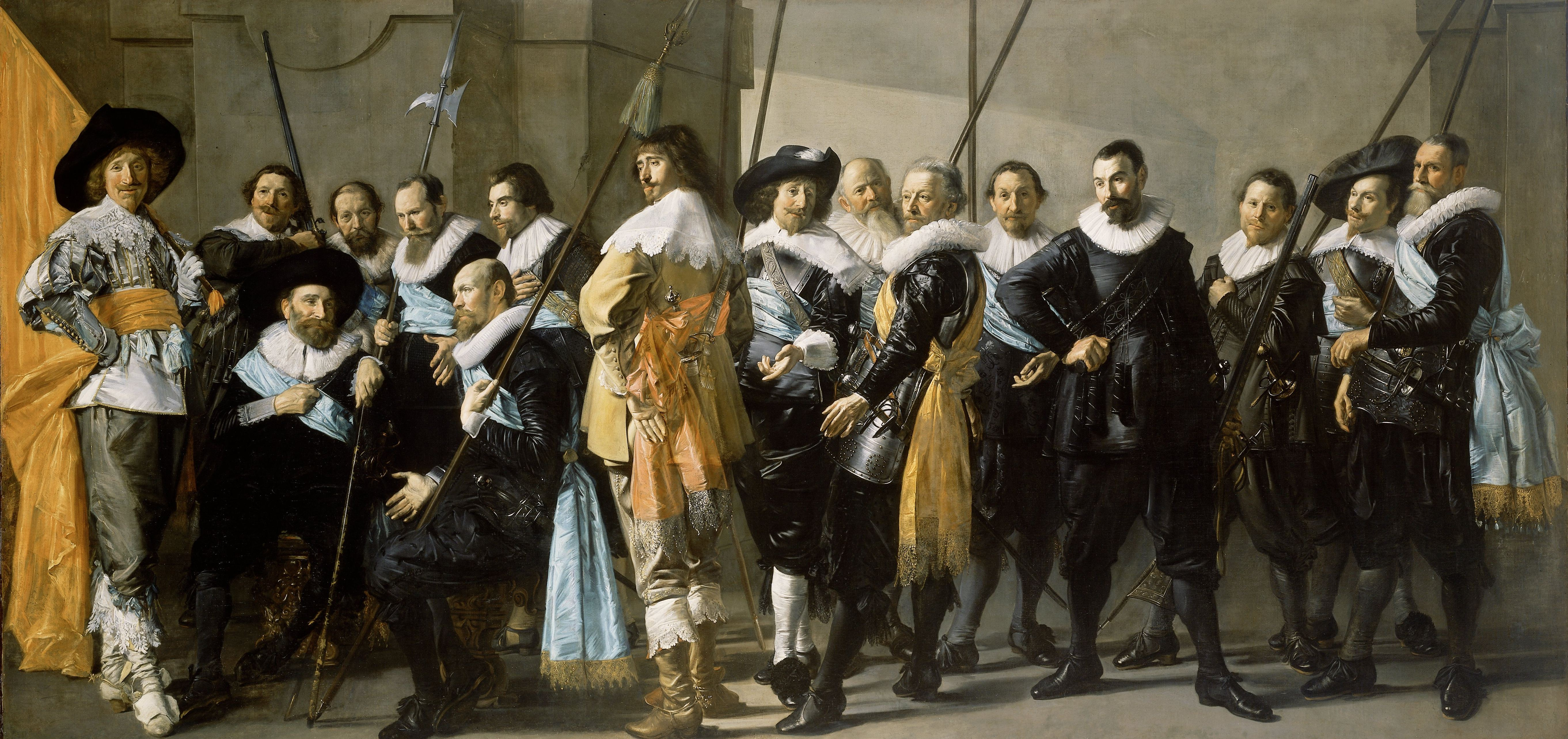
The Meagre Company (1633–37) by Frans Hals and Pieter Codde

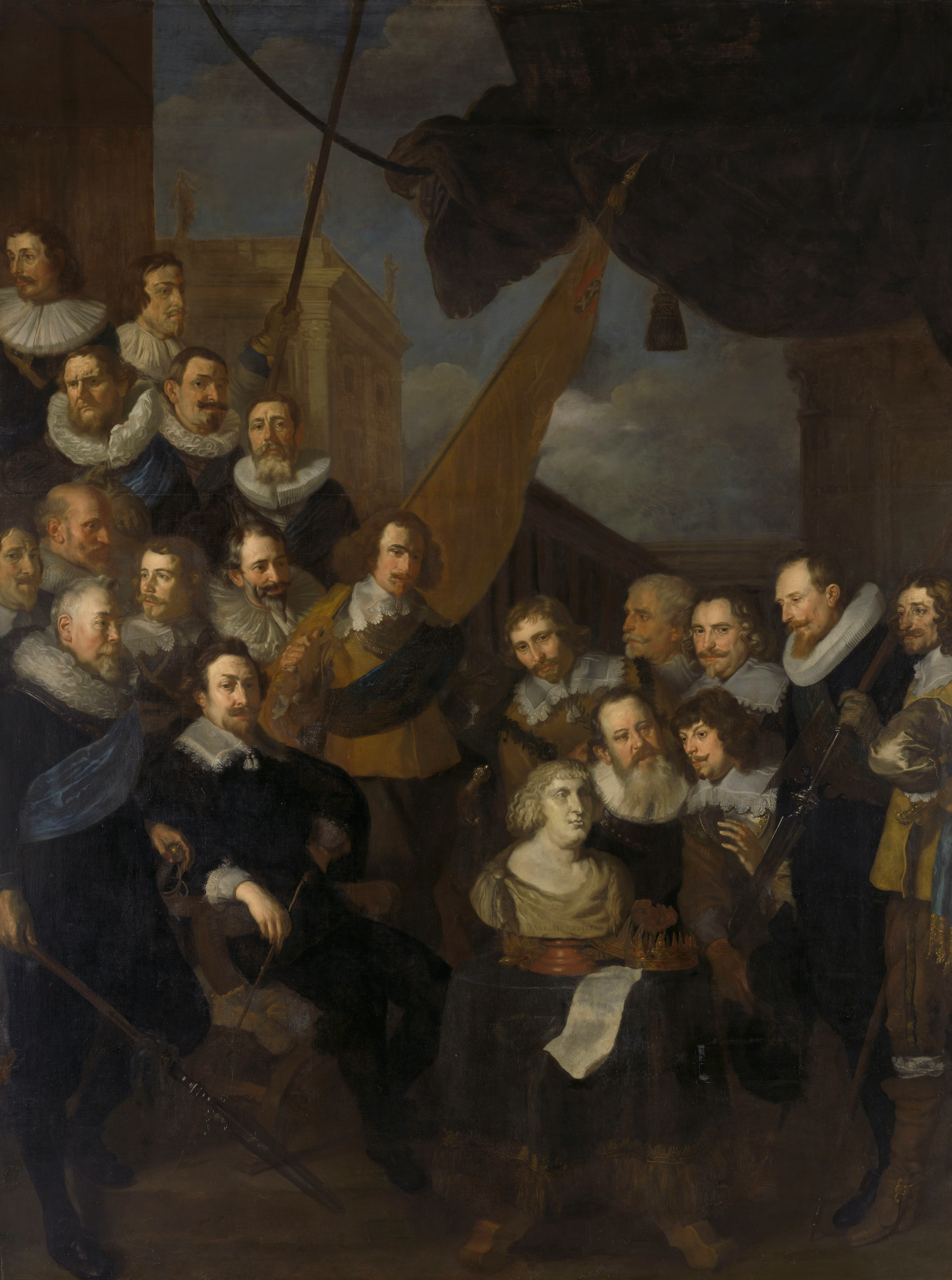
Company of captain Cornelis Bicker and lieutenant Frederick van Banchem, ready to receive Maria de' Medici, queen-mother of France, in September 1638 (1640) by Joachim von Sandrart

The Night Watch (1642) by Rembrandt

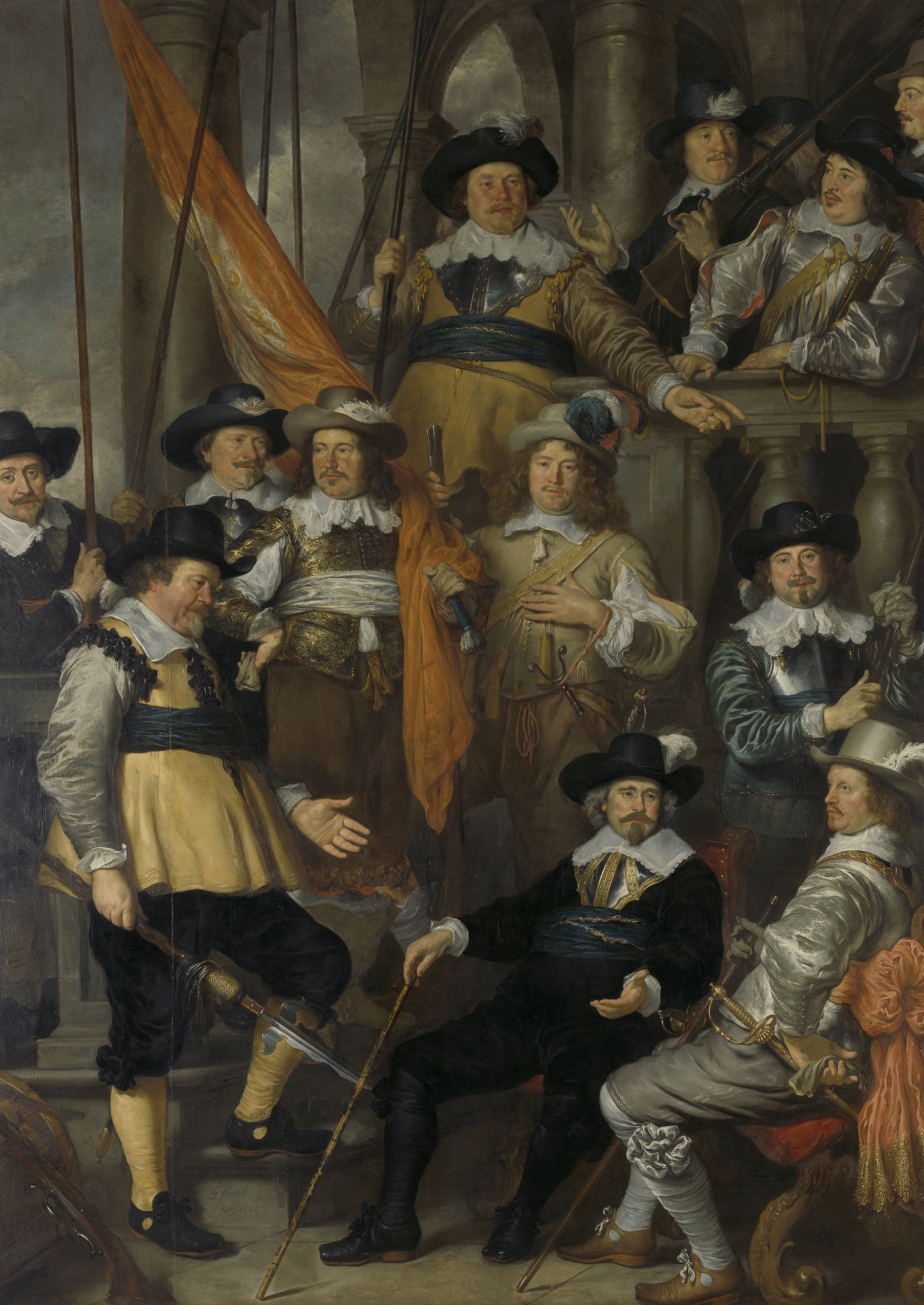
The Company of Captain Albert Bas and Lieutenant Lucas Conijn (1645) by Govert Flinck

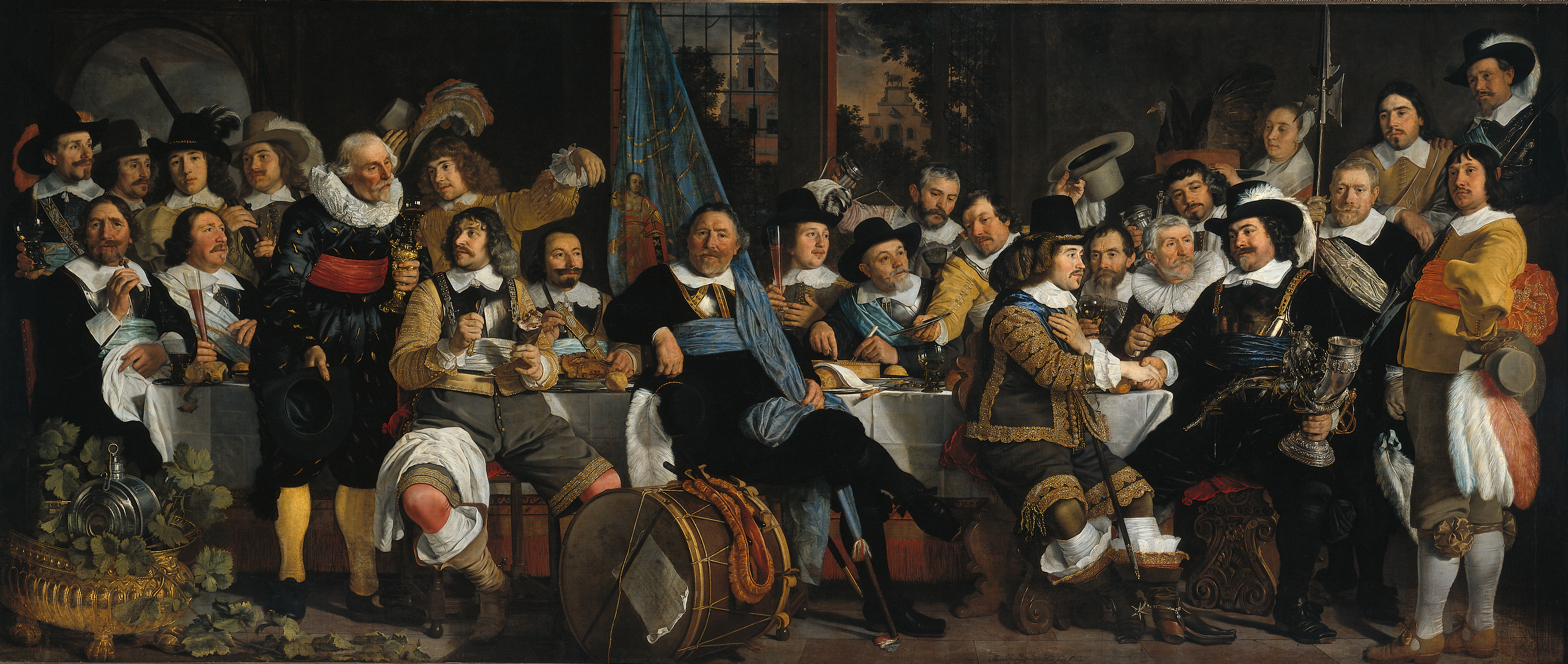
Banquet at the Crossbowmen’s Guild in Celebration of the Treaty of Münster (1648) by Bartholomeus van der Helst

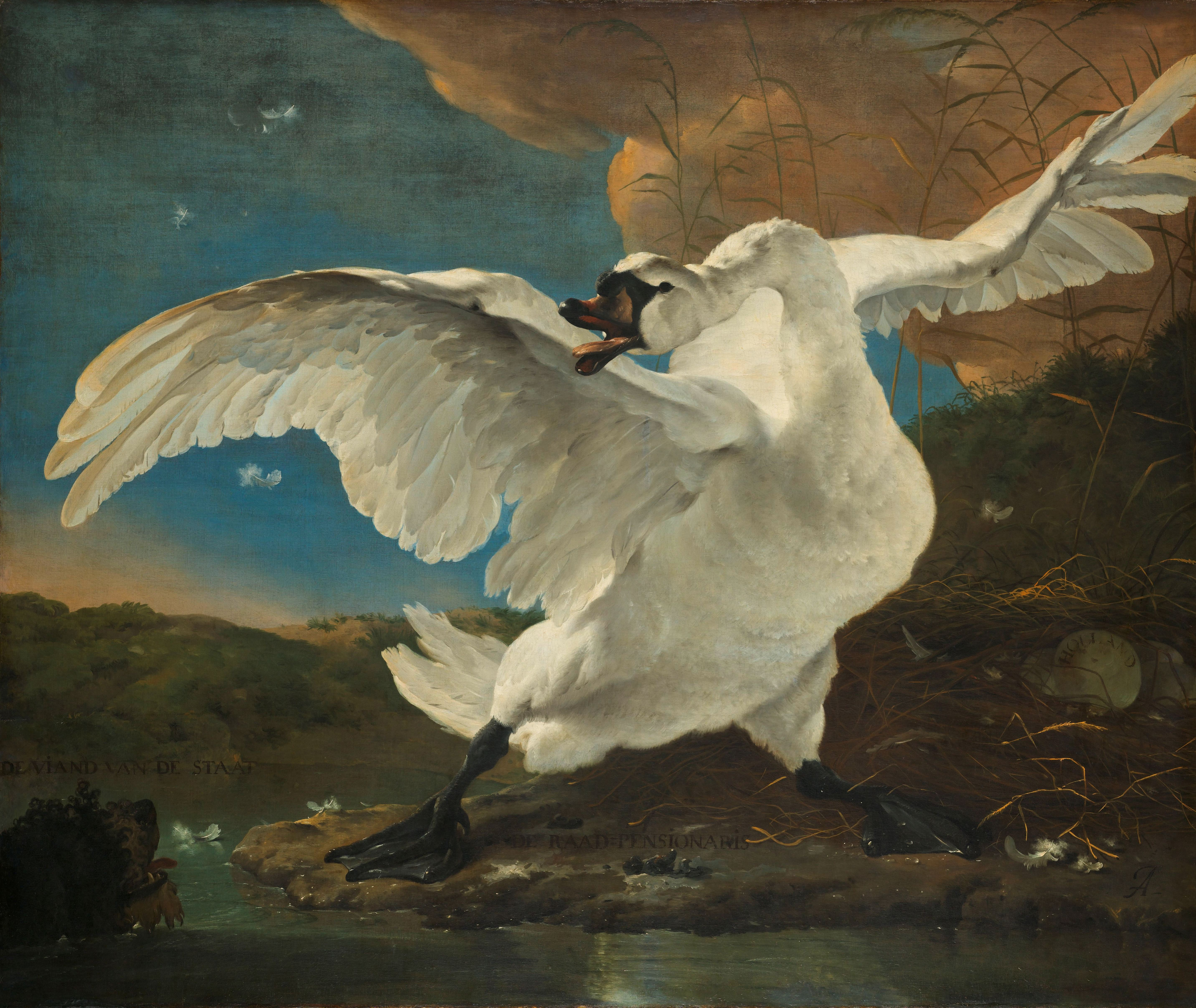
The Threatened Swan (c. 1650) by Jan Asselijn

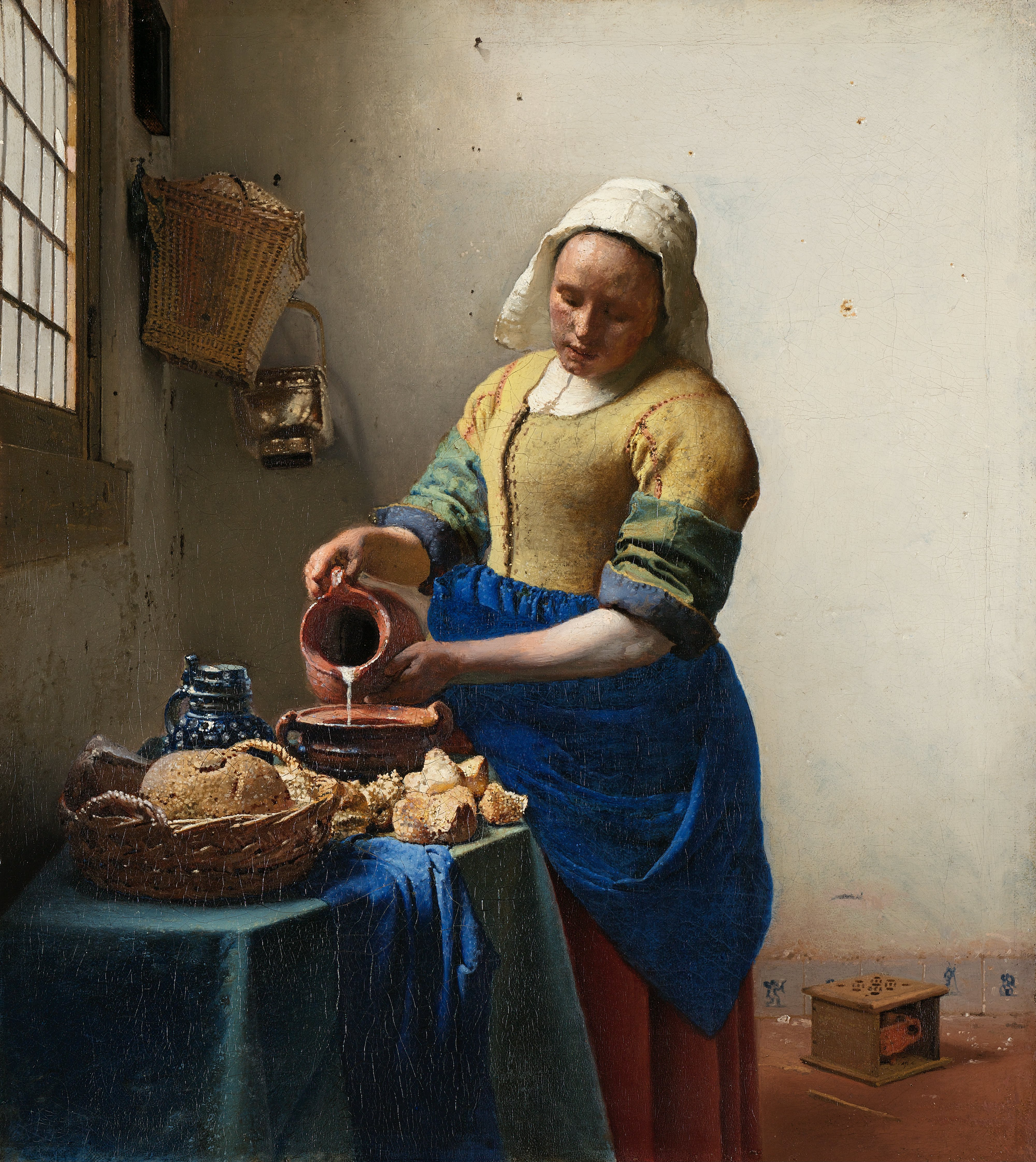
The Milkmaid (c. 1657–58) by Johannes Vermeer

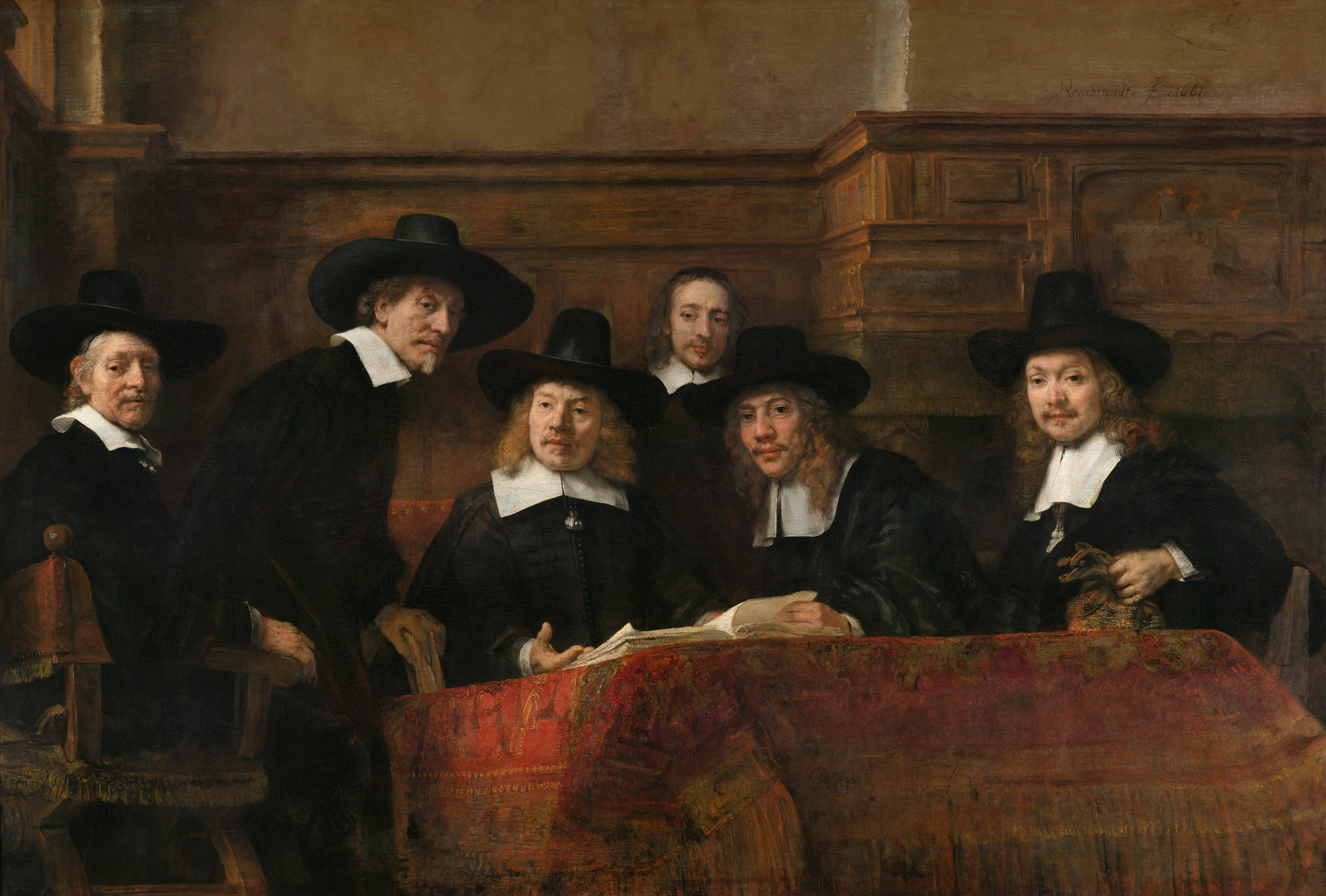
Syndics of the Drapers' Guild (1662) by Rembrandt

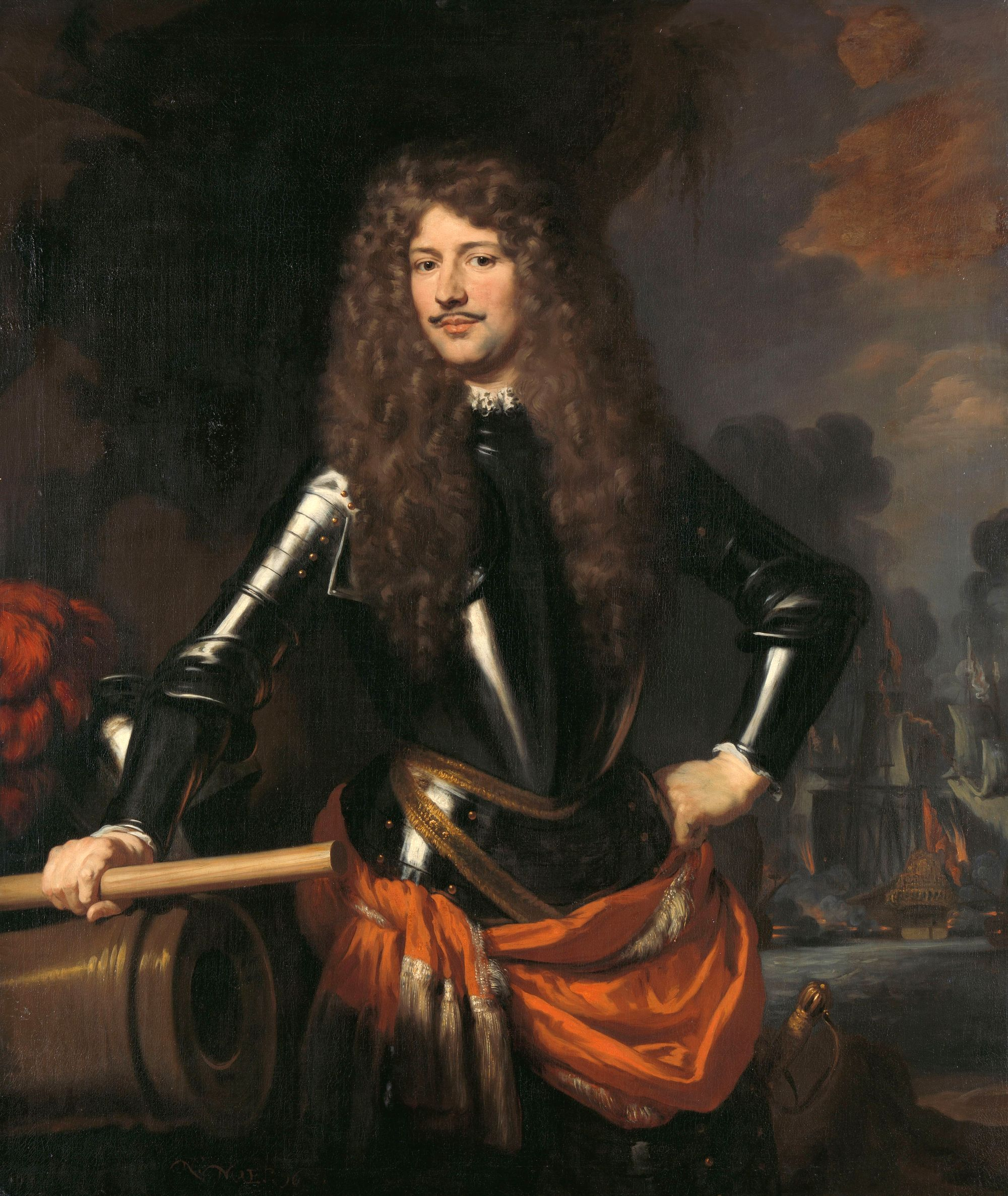
Portrait of Cornelis Evertsen the Youngest, Lieutenant Admiral of Zeeland (1662) by Nicolaes Maes

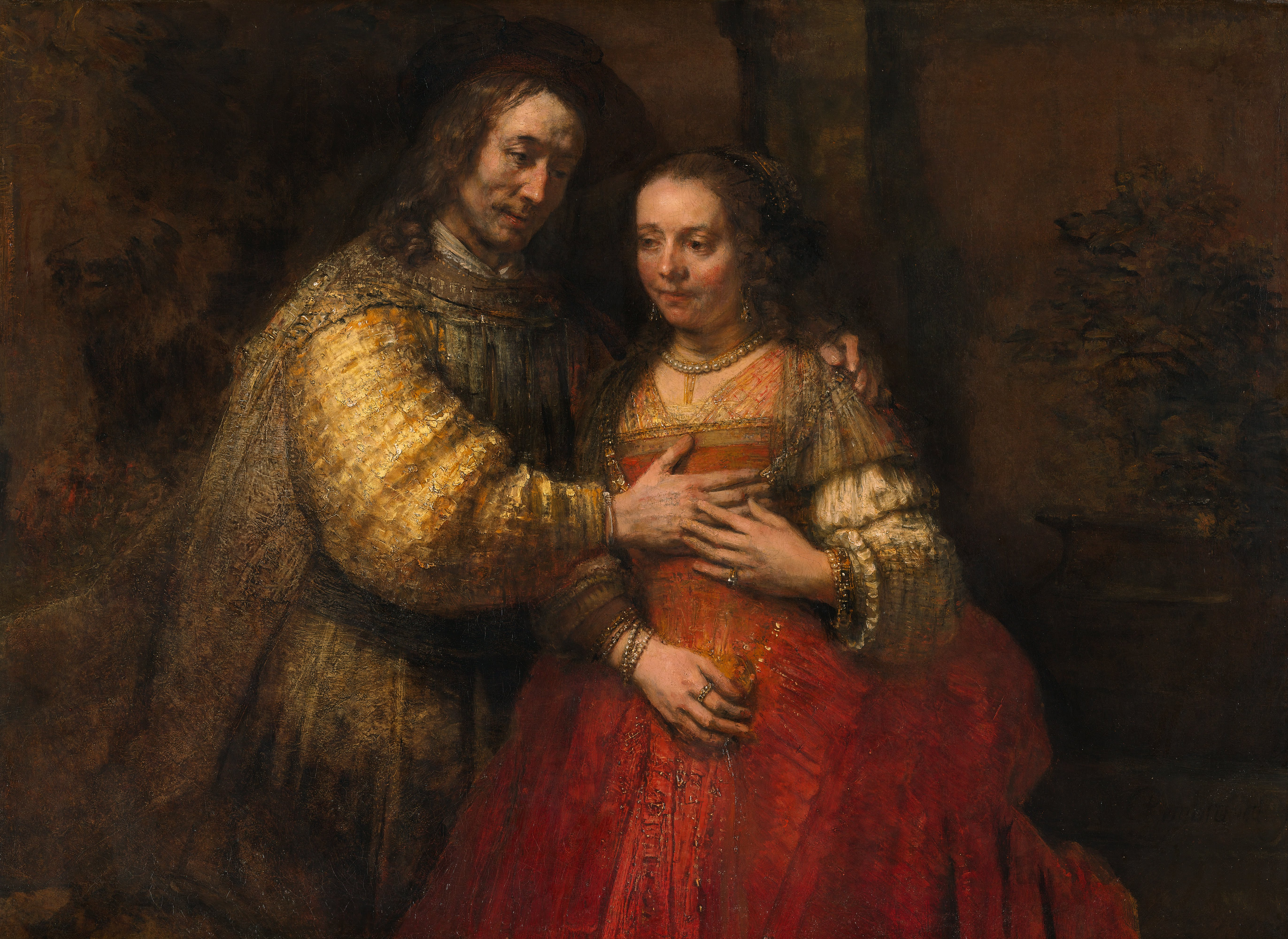
The Jewish Bride (c. 1667) by Rembrandt

Girl in a Blue Dress (1641) by Johannes Cornelisz Verspronck

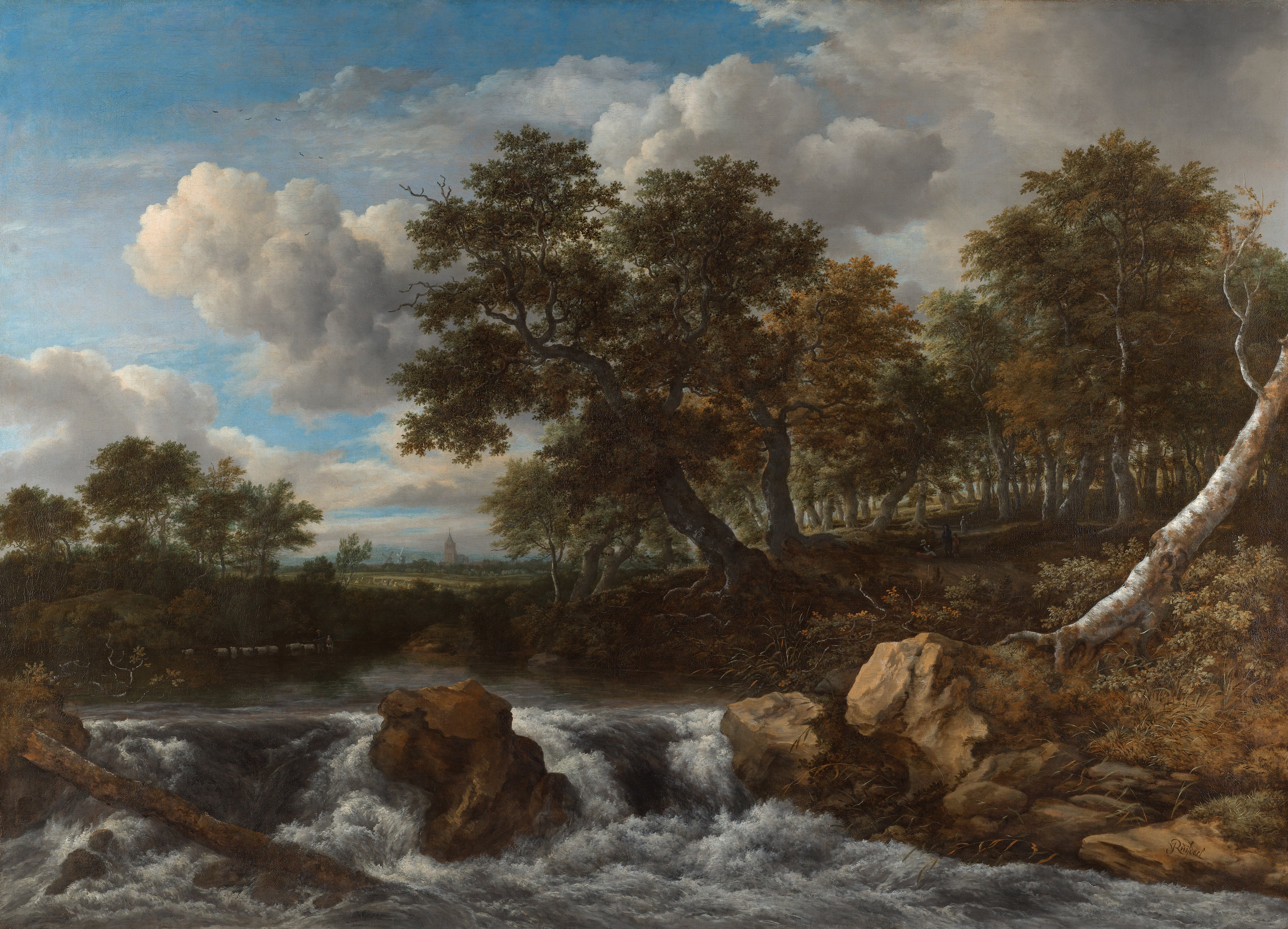
Landscape with Waterfall (1660s) by Jacob van Ruisdael

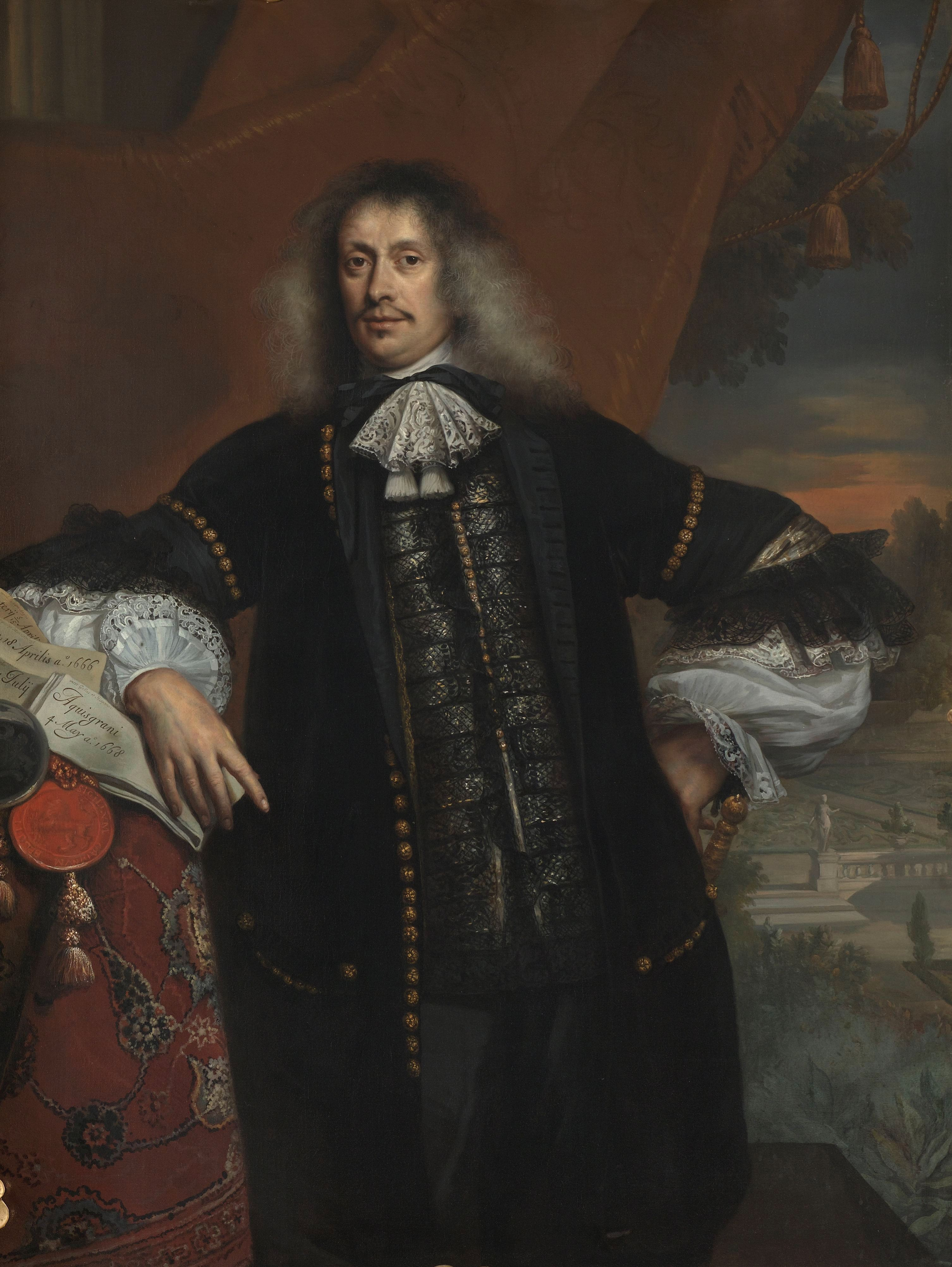
Portrait of Hieronymus van Beverningk (1670) by Jan de Baen

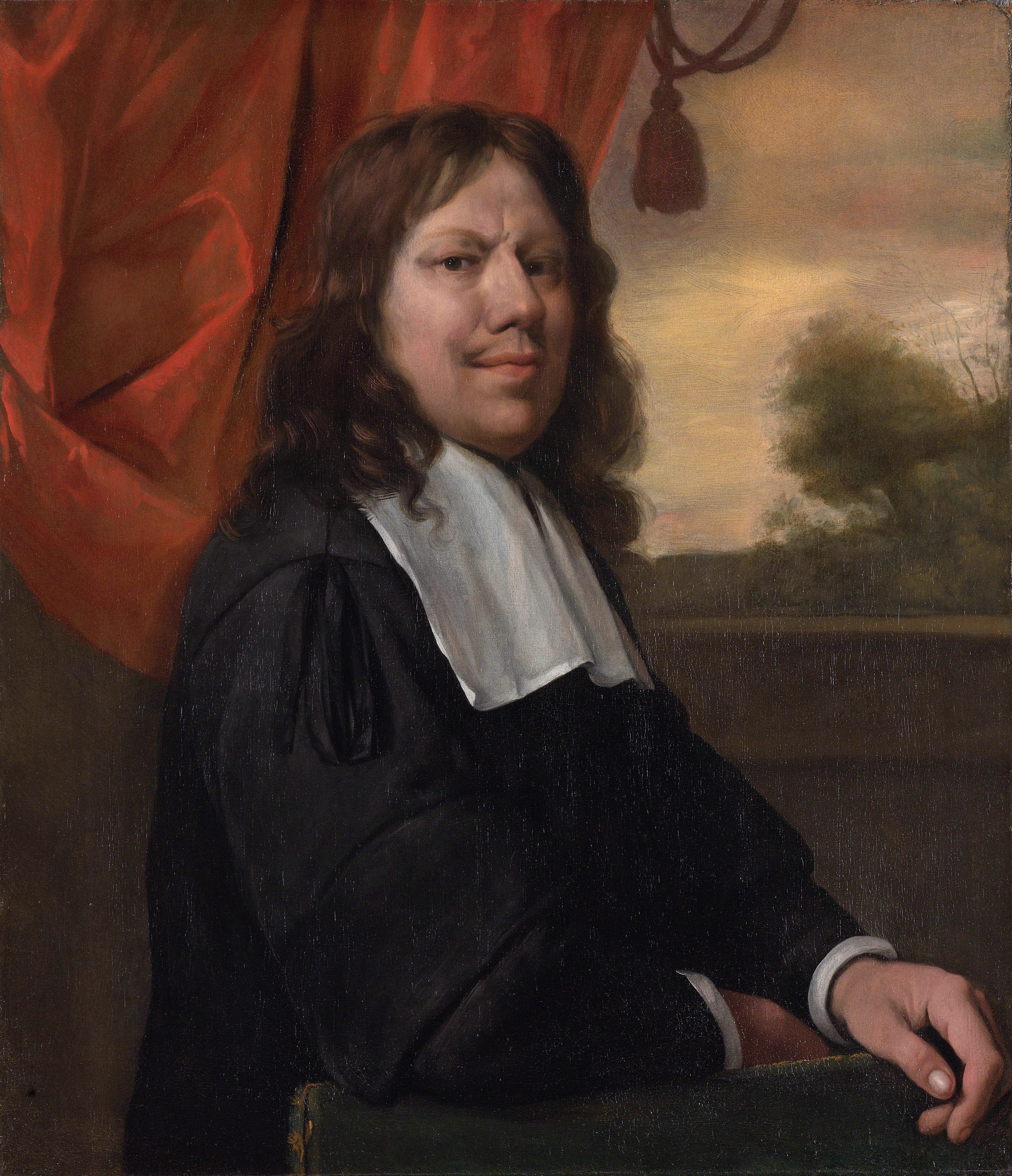
Self-portrait (c. 1670) by Jan Steen

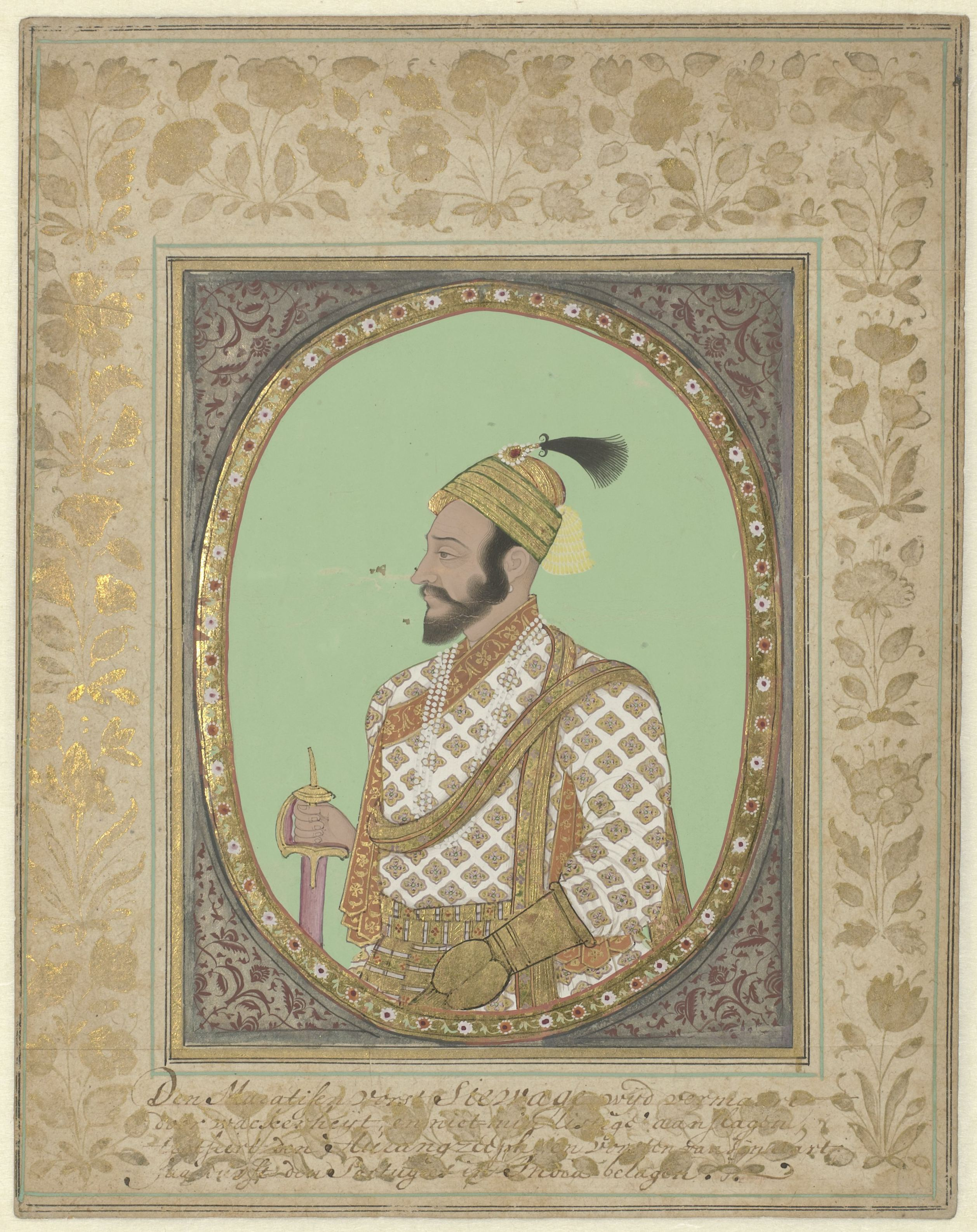
Shivaji's portrait (1680s) in the Rijksmuseum (1630–80)

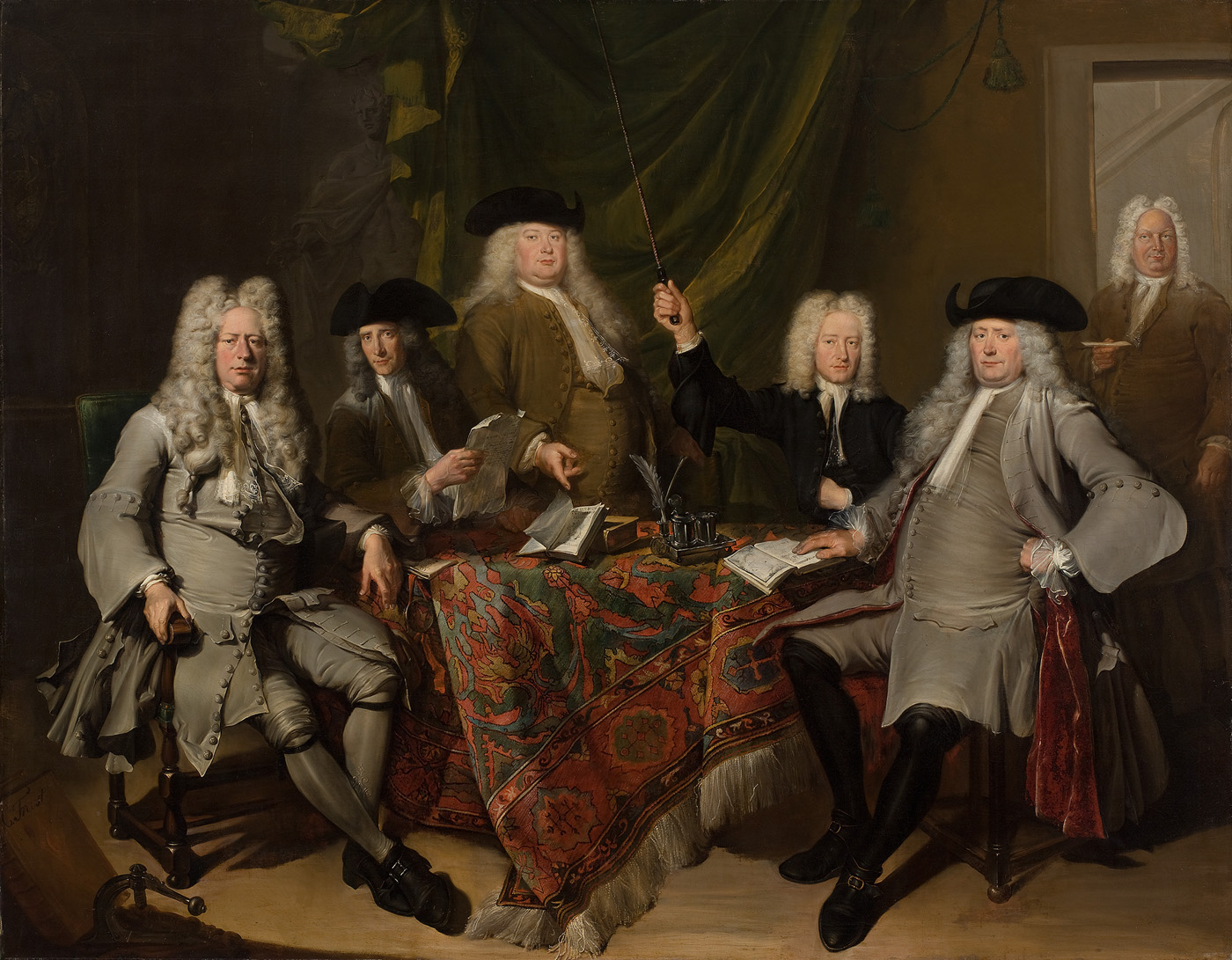
The inspectors of the Collegium Medicum in Amsterdam (1724) by Cornelis Troost

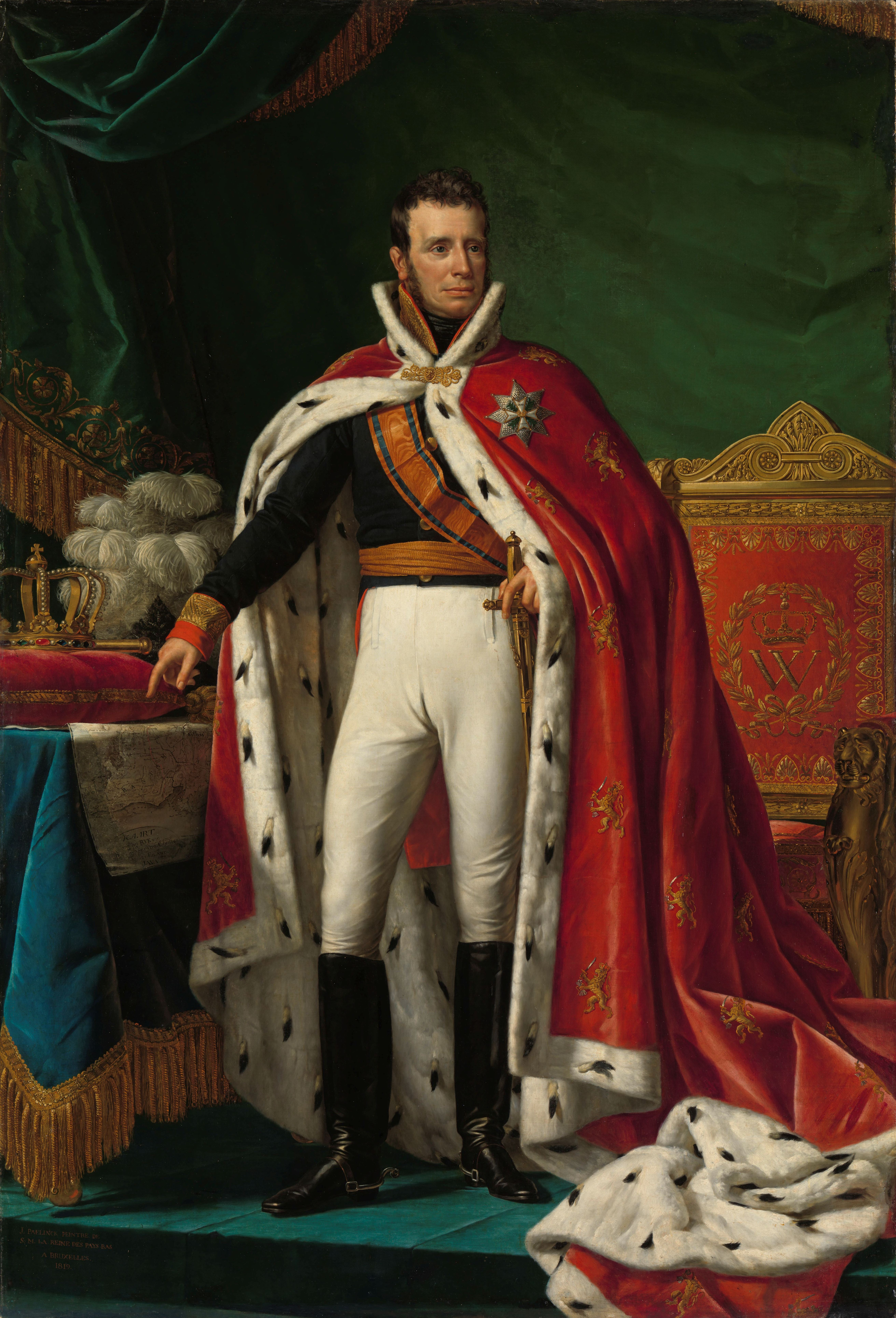
Portrait of William I, King of the Netherlands (1819) by Joseph Paelinck

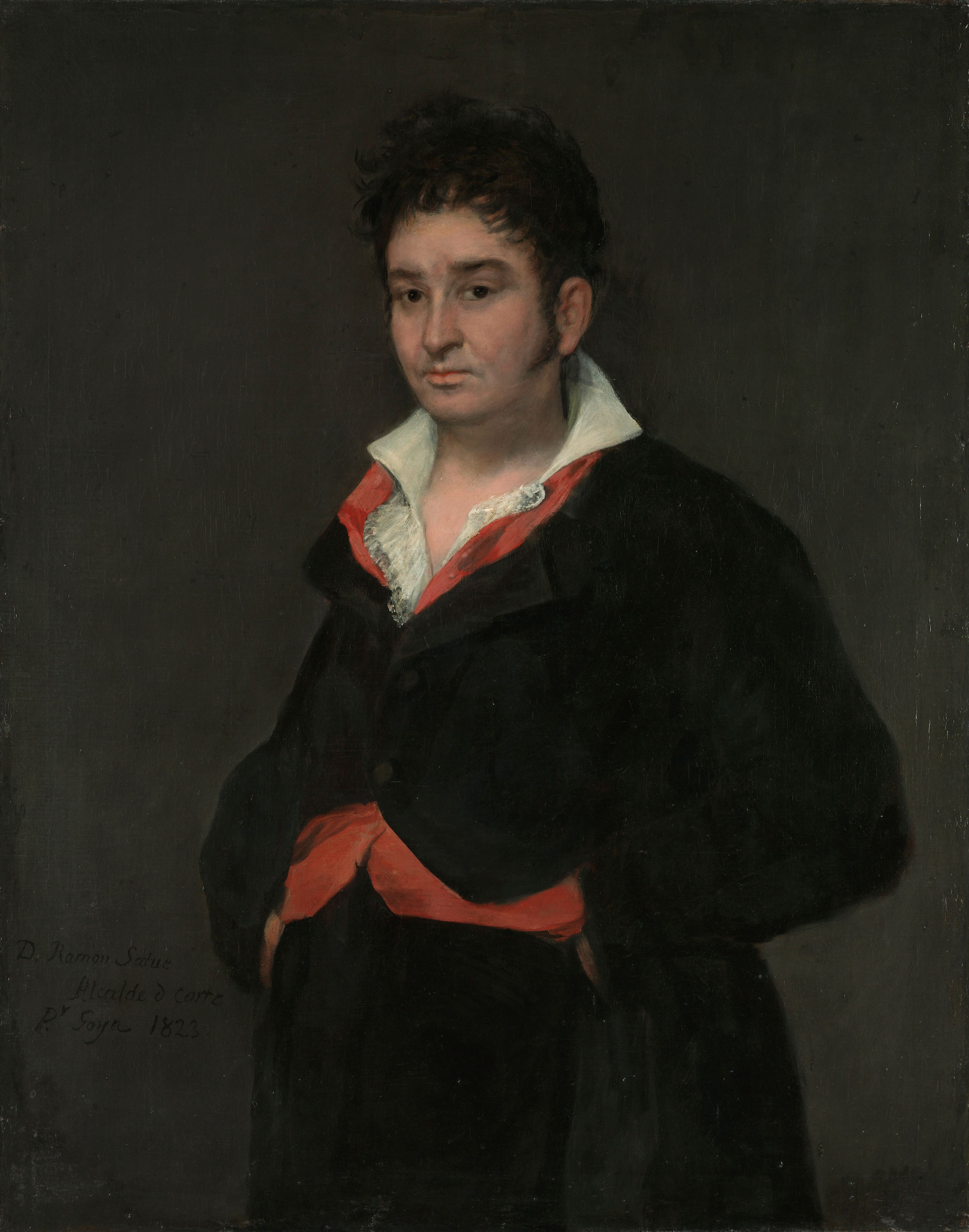
Portrait of Don Ramón Satué (1823) by Francisco Goya

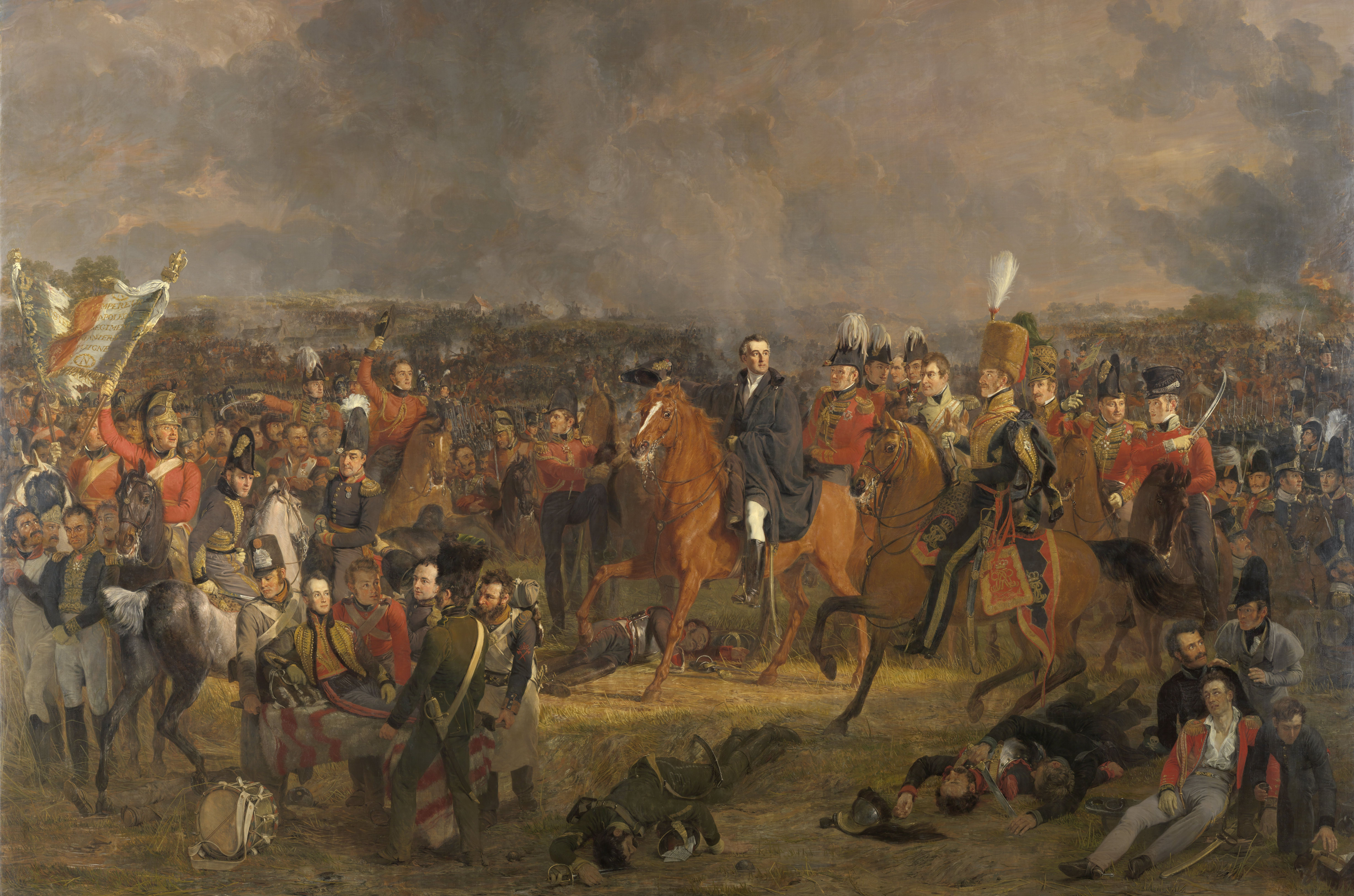
The Battle of Waterloo (1824) by Jan Willem Pieneman

== Special exhibitions ==
=== Rembrandt ===
In 2019, to mark the 350th anniversary of the artist's death, the museum mounted an exhibition of all the works by Rembrandt in its collection. Consisting of 22 paintings, 60 drawings and over 300 prints, this was the first time they had all been exhibited together. Principal features were the marriage portraits of Marten Soolmans and Oopjen Coppit along with the presentation of the Night Watch immediately before its planned restoration. The exhibition ran from February to June.

=== Slavery in the Dutch Empire ===
After previous temporary exhibitions on art historical themes, the Rijksmuseum in 2021 presented an exhibition on the history of slavery in the Dutch colonial empire, focusing on the more than 1.6 million people who were enslaved by Dutch slave traders. It covered trans-Atlantic slavery from the 17th to the 19th century in Suriname, Brazil and the Caribbean, as well as Dutch colonial slavery in South Africa and Asia, where the Dutch West India Company (WIC) and the Dutch East India Company (VOC) were engaged in slavery. Besides objects, such as a wooden block for locking slaves, paintings, archival documents, oral sources, poems and music, the exhibition also presented connections of the slavery system at home in the Netherlands. In the permanent collection, labels were added to 77 paintings and objects that had been seen as symbols of the country's wealth and power to indicate previously hidden links to slavery.

The exhibition was presented both physically in the museum from May to August 2021 and in an online version. It was complemented by audio tours and videos relating personal and real-life stories as well as an accompanying book titled Slavery.

=== Vermeer ===
Between 10 February and 4 June 2023 the Rijksmuseum held the largest exhibition of Vermeer works, with 28 of the known 37 works on display. Curator Pieter Roelofs called it a "once in a lifetime" event. The exhibition was attended by a record 650,000 visitors.

== Number of visitors ==
year	visitors	year	visitors	year	visitors	year	visitors
1975	1,412,000	2000	1,146,438	2010	896,393	2020	675,325
		2001	1,015,561	2011	1,010,402 (Note: This includes the 16,777 visitors to the main building.)	2021	623,923
1992	1,216,103 (Note: In 1993, the visitors number had decreased with 23% to 936,400, i.e. there were approximately 1,216,103 visitors in 1992.)	2002	1,100,488	2012	894,058		
1993	936,400	2003	833,450 (Note: The main building was closed from 7 December 2003.)	2013	2,246,122		
1994	1,002,000 (Note: In 1995, the visitor number had decreased with 60,000 to 942,000, i.e. there were approximately 1,002,000 visitors in 1994.)	2004	812,102	2014	2,474,352		
1995	942,000	2005	842,586	2015	2,345,666		
1996	1,275,000	2006	1,142,182	2016	2,200,000 (est.)		
1997	1,084,652	2007	969,561	2017			
1998	1,229,445	2008	975,977	2018			
1999	1,310,497	2009	876,453	2019			

The 20th-century visitor record of 1,412,000 was reached in the year 1975.

In the 1990s and early 2000s, the Rijksmuseum was annually visited by 0.9 to 1.3 million people. On 7 December 2003, the main building of the museum was closed for a renovation until 13 April 2013. In the preceding decade, the number of visitors had slightly decreased to 0.8 to 1.1 million people. The museum says after the renovation, the museum's capacity is 1.5 to 2.0 million visitors annually. Within eight months since the reopening in 2013, the museum was visited by 2 million people.

The museum had 2.2 million visitors in 2013 and reached an all-time record of 2.47 million visitors in 2014. The museum was the most visited museum in the Netherlands and the 19th most visited art museum in the world in 2013 and 2014.

The COVID-19 pandemic forced the closure of the museum from 15 December 2020, until 4 June 2021.

== Library ==
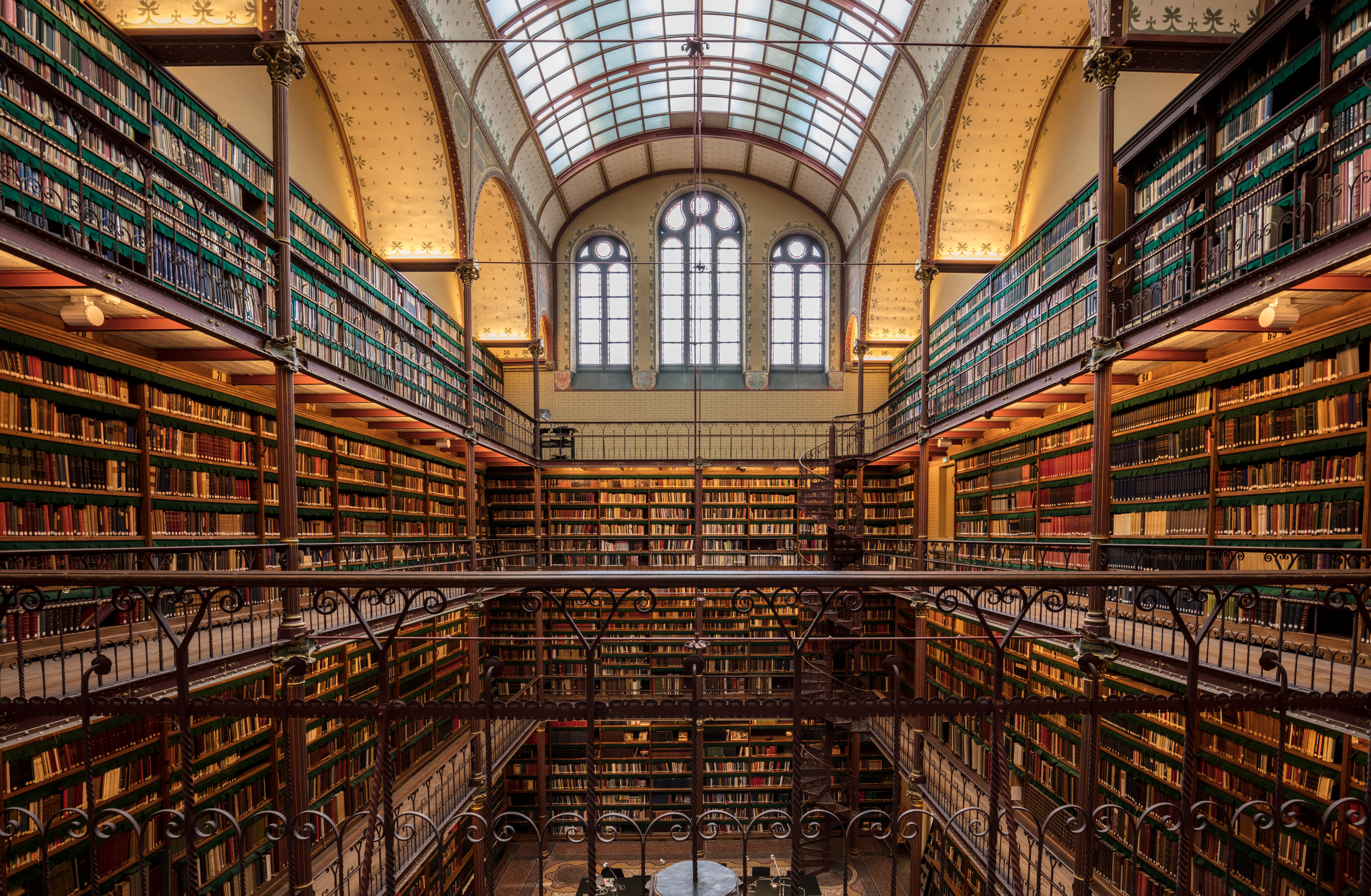
The library in the Rijksmuseum

The Rijksmuseum Research Library is part of the Rijksmuseum, and is the best and the largest public art history research library in The Netherlands.

== Restaurant ==
Rijks, stylised as RIJKS®, is a restaurant with 140 seats in the Philips Wing. Joris Bijdendijk has been the chef de cuisine since the opening in 2014. The restaurant was awarded a Michelin star in 2017.

== See also ==
- Onze Kunst van Heden – exhibition held in the winter of 1939 through 1940
- List of largest art museums
- Amsterdam Museum
