= Taco Dibbits =

Dutch art historian (born 1968)

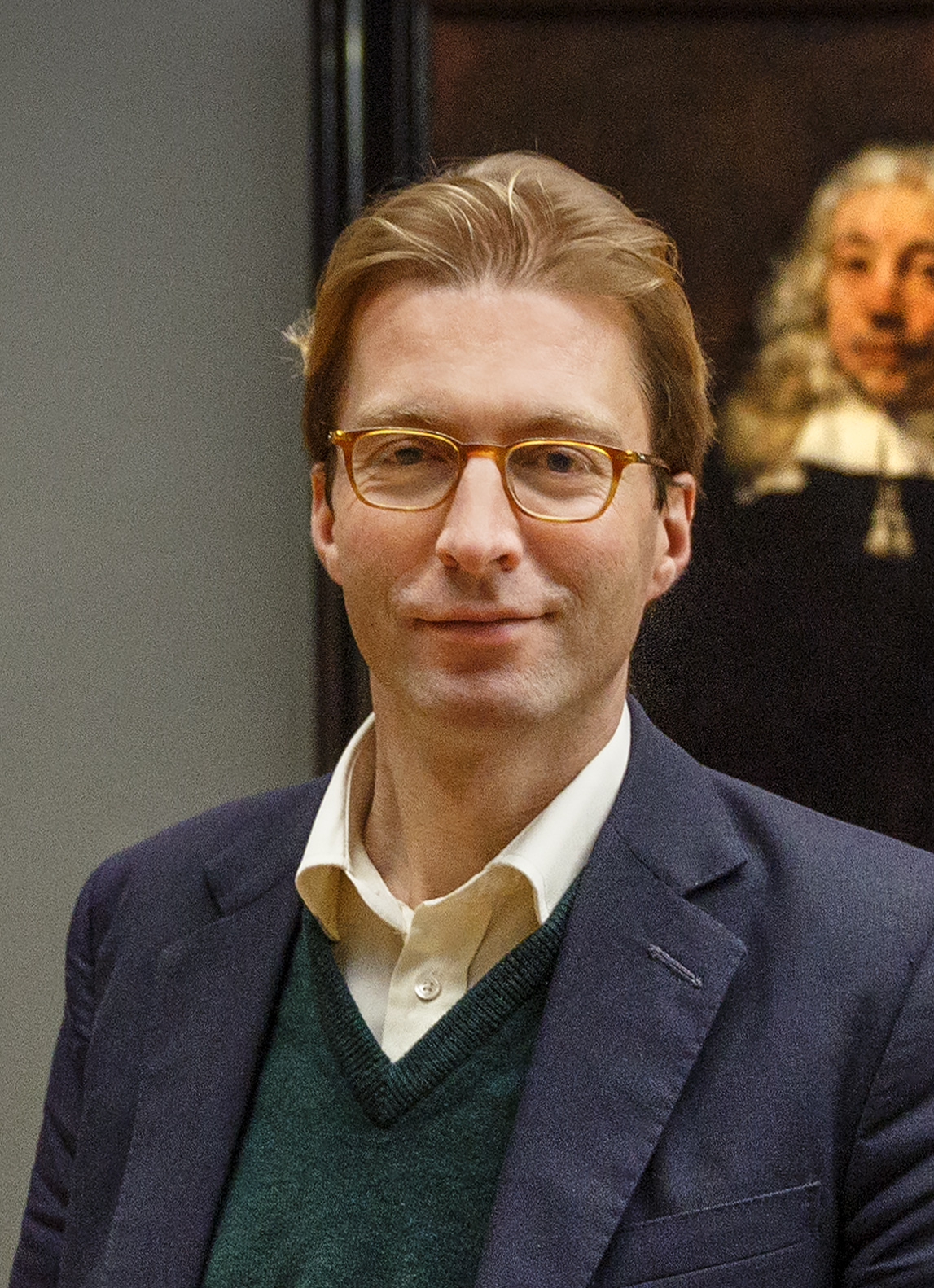
- Dibbits in 2015
- Born: 7 September 1968 (age 57)
- Occupation: Director of Rijksmuseum Amsterdam

Taco Dibbits (Dutch pronunciation: [ˈtaːkoː ˈdɪbɪts]; born 7 September 1968) is a Dutch art historian from Amsterdam, and director of the Rijksmuseum Amsterdam.

== Biography ==
Born 7 September 1968, Dibbits studied art history at the Vrije Universiteit Amsterdam and the University of Cambridge.

Dibbits first came to the Rijksmuseum Amsterdam as a junior staff member in 1995. From 1997 to 2002, he was director of the Old Master Paintings department at Christie's, London. He returned to the Rijksmuseum as curator of 17th-century painting in 2002.

As head of the department of Fine and Decorative Arts from 2006 to 2008, he led a team of curators of paintings, sculpture, applied art and Asiatic art at the Rijksmuseum. He was instrumental in many of the museum's acquisitions, including Jan Steen’s Burgomaster of Delft and Gerrit Berckheyde's View of the Herengracht, Amsterdam, and was closely involved in the successful Rembrandt-Caravaggio exhibition of 2006 as well as the Late Rembrandt exhibition of 2015.

Since 2002, Dibbits has played an important role in developing the layout of the renewed Rijksmuseum. In 2008, he was named Director of Collections, and he succeeded Wim Pijbes as the museum's General Director in July 2016.

Dibbits is also a contributing author to the books Dutch Drawings of the Seventeenth Century in the Rijksmuseum, Amsterdam: Artists Born Between 1580 and 1600 (1997), Rembrandt - Caravaggio (2006), and Dutch Paintings of the 17th Century in the Rijksmuseum, Amsterdam: Artists born between 1570 and 1600 (2008). He has also published on the drawings of the 16th-century Italian artist Girolamo Muziano.
