= Glenn Diesen =

Norwegian political scientist (born 1979)

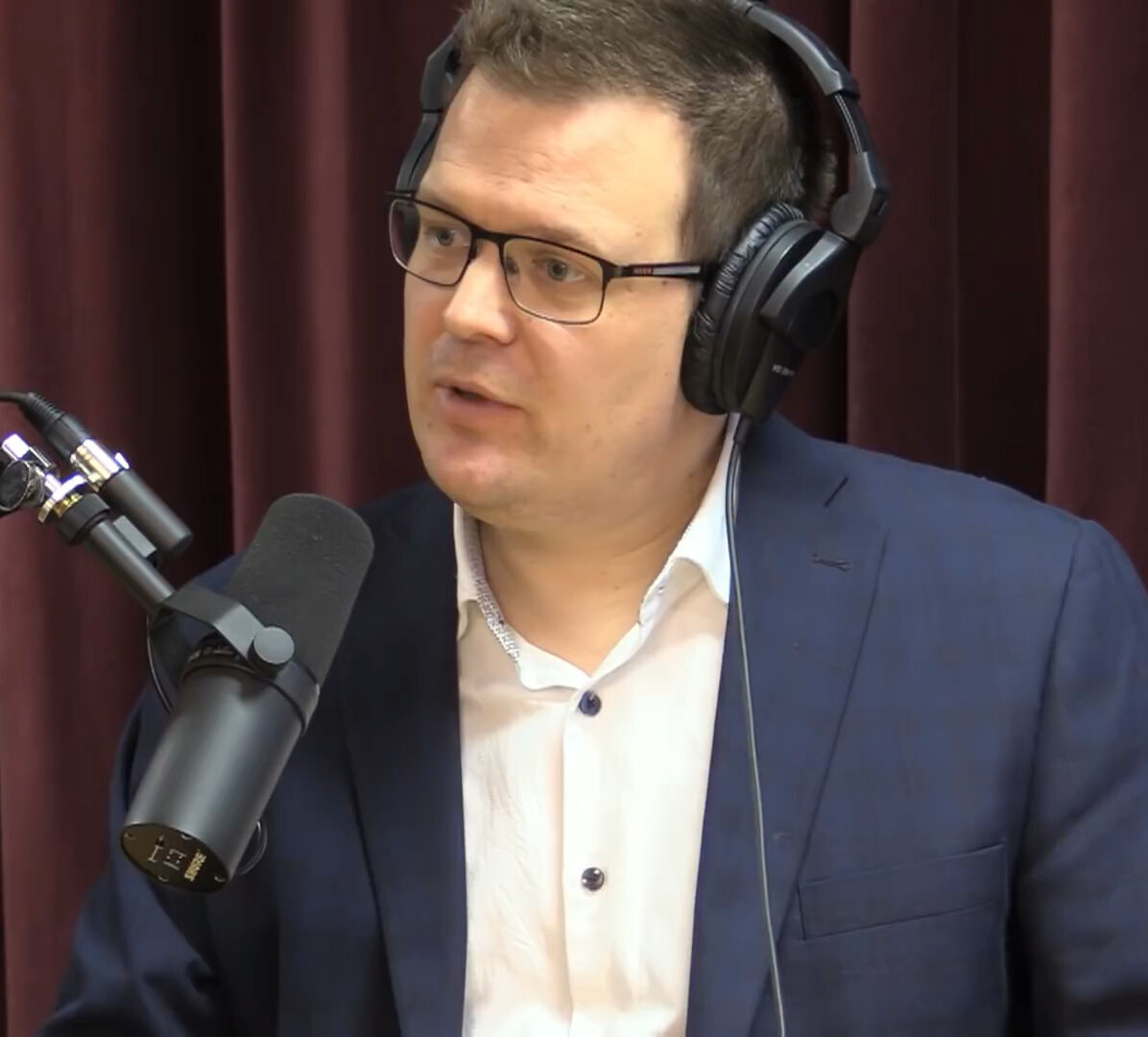
- Diesen on the Wolfgang Wee podcast
- Born: Glenn Eric Andre Diesen; 1979 (age 46–47)

Academic background
- Education: University of Wollongong (B.Com., 2001); University of Sydney (M.Bus., 2004); Macquarie University (M.A., 2009; Ph.D., 2014); Vrije Universiteit Amsterdam (Ph.D., 2014); Saint Petersburg State University
- Thesis: Inter-democratic Security Institutions and the Security Dilemma: EU and NATO Relations with Russia after the Collapse of the Soviet Union (2014)
- Doctoral advisors: Wolfgang Wagner; Steve Wood

Academic work
- Discipline: Political scientist
- School or tradition: Neorealism
- Institutions: University of South-Eastern Norway (2020–); Higher School of Economics (2017–2020); Western Sydney University (2016–2019); Macquarie University (2011–2017)
- Main interests: International relations; Geopolitics; Geoeconomics; Russian foreign policy

Glenn Eric Andre Diesen (born 1979) is a Norwegian political scientist, political commentator and politician who formerly served as a professor at the Department of Business, History and Social Sciences, University of South-Eastern Norway.

Diesen's primary field of research is Russia's Greater Eurasian Partnership strategy, with a focus on the political economy of Russia, conservatism in Russia, Russian foreign policy, and Eurasian economic integration.

He has been a regular commentator on the Russian state-controlled international television network RT for several years, and has been accused of promoting Russian propaganda. (Note: Attributed to multiple references:) In May 2025, he was reported to be a candidate for the pro-Russian party Peace and Justice in Akershus. In November of 2026, Diesen announced his resignation from the University of South-Eastern Norway and fled the country, citing repeated threats against him and cancellation of his speaking appearances.

== Early life and education ==
Glenn Eric Andre Diesen was born in Norway on November 29, 1979. He was raised in the Holmlia neighborhood of Oslo by a Norwegian father and a Dutch mother. At the age of 21 he moved overseas for education. He lived in Australia, Ireland, the Netherlands and Russia.

Diesen obtained a Bachelor of Commerce degree from the University of Wollongong, Australia, in 2001 and a Master of Business degree from the University of Sydney in 2004. He completed two years of Russian language and literature studies at Saint Petersburg State University in 2006. Diesen was awarded a master's degree in international relations from Macquarie University in Sydney, Australia in 2009, his master's thesis was on Russian president Dmitry Medvedev's proposal for a new European security architecture. He received a Ph.D. in politics and international relations jointly from the Vrije Universiteit Amsterdam and Macquarie University in 2014, with a dissertation under the supervision of Wolfgang Wagner and Steve Wood entitled Inter-democratic Security Institutions and the Security Dilemma: EU and NATO relations with Russia after the collapse of the Soviet Union. His dissertation, from a neoclassical realist perspective, addressed the ideational and institutional influence on the rationality of EU and NATO decision-makers on relations with Russia since the collapse of the Soviet Union in the early 1990s.

== Career ==
Diesen worked as a lecturer and scholarly teaching fellow in the Department of Security Studies and Criminology at Macquarie University from 2011 to 2017, as an adjunct research fellow in the School of Social Sciences and Psychology at Western Sydney University from 2016 to 2019, and as a visiting scholar and subsequently a professor in the Faculty of World Economy and International Affairs at the Higher School of Economics in Moscow, Russia from 2018 to 2020. He is affiliated with the Valdai Discussion Club. Since 2018 has been an associate editor of the Moscow-based Russia in Global Affairs journal. He is an advisory board member of the International Institute for Peace in Vienna, the Center for Nationalism Studies (CNS) in Sarajevo, and Contemporary World Economy in Moscow.

In 2020 he became an associate professor at the University of South-Eastern Norway, where he was promoted to professor in 2021. He is recorded as having been the Scholarly Teaching Fellow at the Department of Security Studies and Criminology at Macquarie University.

An international relations scholar, his area of expertise is geopolitics and Russian foreign policy, Russian conservatism, Eurasian economic integration and political propaganda, which he analyzes from a neorealist perspective. He has researched the geoeconomic balance of power, where systemic pressure motivates states to avoid asymmetric interdependence in order to preserve political independence. Diesen describes his theory as the "balance of dependence".

In June 2023, Diesen attended the St. Petersburg International Economic Forum (SPIEF). His attendance, travel and accommodation were paid for by the foundation Think Arctic, part of the Putin-backed Roscongress Foundation. At the conference, the University of St. Petersburg launched a new thinktank, GORKI ("The Geopolitical Observatory for Russia's Key Issues"), led by former Austrian Foreign Minister Karin Kneissl of the far-right Freedom Party (FPÖ) and listing Diesen as one of its twenty "top researchers". Diesen said he knew nothing of the thinktank.

== Commentary and views ==
Diesen has faced extensive and sustained criticism for promoting Russian propaganda.

He has been a regular commentator on Russia Today (RT). In 2021, he contributed more than 50 articles, which he said he did for a fee. In 2022, he said he had not been paid by the channel since the Russian invasion of Ukraine in March. He appeared on the channel ten times in the first half of 2023. He also writes for the conspiracy theorist website Steigan.no and for Ny Tid. He also wrote articles for the Lowy Institute's The Interpreter blog from 2016–2017 while he was a lecturer at Macquarie University. He has a YouTube channel, on which he has hosted John Mearsheimer, Karin Kneissl, Ron Paul, and Douglas Macgregor, and a Rumble channel, on which he has hosted Aleksandr Dugin and Max Blumenthal.

Diesen has written some op-eds published in Aftenposten, some co-authored with Arne Treholt. One 2020 op-ed with Treholt, a convicted KGB agent, stated that Russia has "legitimate interests and security needs" and that Russia was unfairly demonized as a security threat. The article also argues that Norway was becoming the frontline state in the West's war on Russia. The paper's former foreign affairs editor and Moscow correspondent Kjell Dragnes wrote that Diesen and Treholt's article uncritically spread Russian propaganda, and that in postulating that Norway was becoming a frontline state against Russia and China in a militarized Arctic, with the US in the driving seat, they turned things upside down, ignoring large-scale Russian rearmament in the Arctic since 2010, with better equipment on the Kola Peninsula.

Palm Beach Atlantic University historian Roger Chapman's H-Net review of Diesen’s 2020 book The Decay of Western Civilization and Resurgence of Russia describes the book as an ideologically charged defense of Putin’s Russia (Diesen calls Russia's incursions into neighboring countries as “nation-building initiatives”) and an "incarnation of Russian messianic thinking", which romanticizes authoritarianism and positions Russia as a cultural savior amidst Western decline. Chapman argues that Diesen's ideas resonate with those of the alt-right, noting Diesen’s admiration for figures like Steve Bannon and his approval of authoritarianism as a “moral virtue.”

Russian studies scholar Susanna Rabow-Edling's Nordisk Østforum review of Russian Conservatism (2021) criticizes Diesen for blurring the line between scholarly analysis and ideological advocacy, noting that his use of ideologically loaded concepts undermines the book’s academic credibility. As she writes, “Diesen’s book is difficult to read, since it is unclear whether it constitutes a societal analysis or a partisan contribution to the debate on Russia’s future,” adding that he blends “subjective judgments and objective analysis” while presenting conservative assumptions as universal truths. Russian Conservatism was described by The Christians Party leader Erik Selle as the "year’s most important book"; Selle took the term "national conservativism" from Diesen to describe his own ideology.

Diesen’s 2022 book Russophobia is about anti-Russian sentiment. It rejects as Russophobic propaganda the accusation that Russia was preparing an invasion of Ukraine; however, Russia's full invasion of Ukraine took place before the book was published. In a review in the periodical Vagant, Russian studies scholar Kåre Johan Mjør argued that the work itself functions as propaganda. Mjør contended that the book employs sweeping generalizations, lacks engagement with relevant academic literature, and selectively cites sources to promote a pro-Kremlin narrative, concluding that the book fails to meet basic standards of scholarly rigor. In a review for Media, War & Conflict, Chang Zhang and Ting Zhou of the Communication University of China described the book as an insightful analysis of Russophobia in the West and its negative implications especially for the latter. They concluded that the book "has arguably drawn a delicate balance between theoretical reflectivity, historical depth and empirical breadth."

In Spring 2022, after Russia's full invasion of Ukraine, Diesen was widely criticised for his regular writing for RT. The Swedish journalist Patrik Oksanen said that Diesen is "part of the Russian propaganda machinery." Aage Borchgrevink of the Norwegian Helsinki Committee said that Diesen has "an important role in RT as the Western expert, which gives legitimacy to what clearly appears to be the Kremlin's version [...] his writings are unreliable, the factual basis is doubtful, and characterized by the content and form of Russian propaganda, as expressed in RT and Sputnik." In responding, Diesen said he opposes Russia's military action against Ukraine.

Diesen states that a significant reason for the 2022 Russian invasion of Ukraine is NATO's eastward expansion and Russian security concerns regarding Ukraine membership in the alliance. He believes that the conflict is largely a proxy war between NATO and Russia over control of the Black Sea region with Ukraine as the victim of their power struggle. Nonetheless, Diesen believes that the Russian invasion was a serious misjudgment by the country's leadership.

Peace Research Institute Oslo's Pavel K. Baev, in his review of The Ukraine War and the Eurasian World Order (2024), describes Diesen’s book as an uncritical academic defense of Putin’s invasion of Ukraine, stating it attempts to justify Russian aggression using “blend of shallow history, vulgar geopolitics and undiluted propaganda.” Baev criticizes Diesen for presenting the war as a positive event, “the graveyard of liberal hegemony”, and for relying on “lengthy quotes from Putin and Xi Jinping” in place of substantive analysis or theoretical grounding. Geoffrey Roberts praised the book in his review for The Political Quarterly. Writing that Diesen is a soft realist with the book being "as much about ideas, values and subjectivities as transformations in power structures". Roberts states that "In no way does Diesen justify Putin's action—‘a war of aggression with unpredictable consequences’—but he does try to understand it." Ultimately, according to Roberts, Diesen sees that Western policies in Ukraine will lead to the transition of international relations from that of liberal hegemony dominated by the United States to a multipolar Eurasian world order.

In March 2025, a group of 20 Norwegian academics published an open letter accusing the Norwegian Helsinki Committee of attempting to curtail Diesen’s academic freedom. The Committee rejected the allegations as baseless, stating that they had not advocated for any form of censorship or dismissal, but had exercised their own freedom of expression in criticizing Diesen's role in disseminating Russian propaganda. 50 academics and public figures signed a counter-statement in support of the Committee, defending its right to publicly criticize Diesen’s views and methods. They argued that academic freedom must be grounded in truth-seeking and scholarly integrity, and asserted that Diesen "frequently operates well outside of that scope." 37 University of South-Eastern Norway staff also published an open letter condemning Diesen's views.

In May 2025, Diesen faced renewed criticism from commentators and researchers who accused him of actively promoting Russian state narratives under the guise of academic analysis. Former minister Torbjørn Røe Isaksen criticized Diesen’s rhetorical style and misrepresentation of academic sources. Aage Borchgrevink argued that Diesen’s public statements, such as casting doubt on Russian responsibility for the Bucha massacre, violate basic norms of academic integrity, and called for investigation by his university’s research ethics board. Scholars Kåre Johan Mjør and Sven G. Holtsmark criticised Diesen's work for lacking scholarly rigor and promoting an ideological narrative aligned with Russian state propaganda, arguing that his publications rely on selective use of sources, omit crucial context, and fall short of academic standards, replacing analysis with ideological framing. Holtsmark, a historian, argued that Diesen's claims misrepresent sources to frame Ukraine and the West as provocateurs and saboteurs of peace. He concludes that Diesen's claims overwhelmingly mirror Kremlin propaganda and distort reality under the guise of scholarly authority, offering ideology in place of analysis and systematically disregarding basic standards of academic integrity.

In 2026, during a visit to China, he advocated Europe accepting the defeat of Ukraine, while praising China's position, on a Chinese video channel.

== Political activism ==
As recently as 2022, Diesen has supported the right-wing Christian conservative microparty, Conservative (not related to the Conservative Party), focusing on criticism of Western countries. Geir Tønnessen has described Diesen as the party leader's "mentor".

In the 2025 Norwegian parliamentary election Diesen became the top candidate of the pro-Russian party Fred og Rettferdighet in Akershus. In May 2025, Diesen appeared in an advertisement campaign on behalf of the party, which was widely criticized for echoing Russian propaganda and promoting pro-Kremlin talking points. The campaign, which featured slogans opposing aid to Ukraine and Diesen's name and picture, was condemned by politicians across the political spectrum, with critics accusing both the party and Diesen of spreading disinformation aligned with Russian state interests. The Governing Mayor of Oslo, Eirik Lae Solberg, called the campaign "ugly" and "an echo of Russian propaganda." Questions were also raised about the campaign's financing, which reportedly had a list price of 1.4 million kroner. As of late May, the party had only reported a single donation of 50,000 kroner, prompting the Political Parties Act Committee to launch an investigation into the legality and transparency of its funding. Former Foreign Minister Ine Eriksen Søreide said that Diesen and Marielle Leraand promote "complete nonsense (...) they've swallowed the Russian propaganda whole." It was revealed that the pro-Russian advertisement campaign was paid for by Atle Berge, a Russia-based billionaire who maintains a pro-Kremlin stance. Diesen and his party have received support from the neo-Nazi organization Vigrid.

== Bibliography ==
=== Books ===
- EU and NATO Relations with Russia: After the Collapse of the Soviet Union. Routledge. 2017. ISBN 9781138063273.
- Russia's Geoeconomic Strategy for a Greater Eurasia. Routledge. 2017. ISBN 9780415791687.
- The Decay of Western Civilisation and Resurgence of Russia: Between Gemeinschaft and Gesellschaft. Routledge. 2019. ISBN 9780367587383.
- Europe as the Western Peninsula of Greater Eurasia: Geoeconomic Regions in a Multipolar World. Rowman & Littlefield. 2021. ISBN 9781538161760.
- Great Power Politics in the Fourth Industrial Revolution: The Geoeconomics of Technological Sovereignty. Bloomsbury. 2021. ISBN 9780755607013.
- Russian Conservatism: Managing Change Under Permanent Revolution. Rowman & Littlefield. 2021. ISBN 9781538149980.
- Diesen, Glenn (2022). Russophobia: Propaganda in International Politics. Singapore: Springer Nature Singapore. doi:10.1007/978-981-19-1468-3. ISBN 978-981-19-1467-6.
- The Think Tank Racket: Managing the Information War with Russia. Clarity Press. 2023. ISBN 9781949762808.
- The Ukraine War and the Eurasian World Order. Clarity Press. 2024. ISBN 9781949762952.
- Diesen, Glenn (2021). Russian Conservatism: Managing Change under Permanent Revolution (1 ed.). The Rowman & Littlefield Publishing Group. doi:10.5040/9798881814434. ISBN 979-8-8818-1443-4.

==== As editor ====
- Russia in a Changing World. Co-edited with Alexander Lukin. Springer. 2020. ISBN 9789811518942.
- The Return of Eurasia: Continuity and Change. Co-edited with Alexander Lukin. Palgrave Macmillan. 2021. ISBN 9789811621789.

=== Book chapters ===
- D. Gopal; D. Ahlawat, eds. (2016). "Russia's Pivot to Asia: Constructing a Eurasian State in a Multipolar World". Indo-Pacific: Emerging Powers, Evolving Regions and Challenges to Global Governance. New Delhi: Aakar.
- L. Grigoryev, ed. (2019). "Narrowing the widening political gap". Global Governance in Transformation: Challenges for International Cooperation. London: Springer.
- H. Reginbogin; P. Lottaz, eds. (2020). "Neutral Power Russia?". Permanent Neutrality. Washington D.C.: Lexington Books.
- C. Hawksley; N. Georgeou, eds. (2020). "Russia and COVID-19: Domestic Relief and Geoeconomic Reforms". State Responses to COVID-19. Sydney: Humanitarian and Development Research Initiative.
- A. Aseeva; J. Gorski, eds. (2020). "The Geoeconomics of the Eurasian Economic Union". The Law and Policy of New Eurasian Regionalization Economic Integration, Trade, and Investment in the Post-Soviet and Greater Eurasian Space. Leiden: Brill.
- Reginbogin, Herbert R.; Lottaz, Pascal, eds. (2020). Permanent Neutrality: A Model for Peace, Security, and Justice (1 ed.). Lexington Books. doi:10.5040/9781978722507.ch-006. ISBN 978-1-9787-2250-7.
- M. Patai; M. Horvath, eds. (2021). "Cooperation and Competition Among Tech Hubs Across Greater Eurasia in the Fourth Industrial Revolution". Age of Eurasia. Budapest: Prospektus.
- Diesen, Glenn (2022). Russophobia: Propaganda in International Politics. Singapore: Springer Nature Singapore. doi:10.1007/978-981-19-1468-3. ISBN 978-981-19-1467-6.
- Diesen, Glenn (2022), "The Foundational Stereotypes of Anti-Russian Propaganda", Russophobia, Singapore: Springer Nature Singapore, pp. 45–82, doi:10.1007/978-981-19-1468-3_3, ISBN 978-981-19-1467-6
- Diesen, Glenn (2022), "Legitimising Hierarchies: An International System of Sovereign Inequality", Russophobia, Singapore: Springer Nature Singapore, pp. 145–173, doi:10.1007/978-981-19-1468-3_6, ISBN 978-981-19-1467-6
- Diesen, Glenn (4 December 2024), "The Arctic in the Greater Eurasian Partnership", Human Security through the New Traditional Economy in the Arctic (1 ed.), London: Routledge, pp. 63–74, doi:10.4324/9781003511434-4, ISBN 978-1-003-51143-4
- Diesen, Glenn (2023), "Irrational Politics: The Domestic Component of Russiagate", in Boyd-Barrett, Oliver; Marmura, Stephen (eds.), Russiagate Revisited, Cham: Springer International Publishing, pp. 183–199, doi:10.1007/978-3-031-30940-3_9, ISBN 978-3-031-30939-7

=== Journal articles ===
- Diesen, Glenn; Wood, Steve (2012). "Russia's Proposal for a New European Security System: Confirming Diverse Perspectives". Australian Journal of International Affairs. 66 (4): 450–467. doi:10.1080/10357718.2012.692530.
- "Coercing 'European Integration'? Assessing the posture of the CSDP". Polis (6): 81–102. 2015.
- "Inter-democratic security institutions and the security dilemma: a neoclassical realist model of the EU and NATO after the end of the Soviet Union". East European Quarterly. 41 (2–3): 137–161. 2015.
- Keane, Conor; Diesen, Glenn (2015). "Divided We Stand: The US foreign policy bureaucracy and nation-building in Afghanistan". International Peacekeeping. 22 (3): 205–229. doi:10.1080/13533312.2015.1039456.
- Diesen, Glenn; Keane, Conor. "Constraining Missile Defence". Defense and Security Analysis. 32 (2): 129–143. doi:10.1080/14751798.2016.1160487.
- Gatev, Ivaylo; Diesen, Glenn (2016). "Eurasian Encounters: The Eurasian Economic Union and the Shanghai Cooperation Organisation". European Politics and Society. 17 (1): 133–150. doi:10.1080/23745118.2016.1171364.
- Diesen, Glenn; Keane, Conor (2017). "The Two-Tiered division of Ukraine: Historical Narratives in Nation- and Region-Building". Journal of Balkan and Near Eastern Studies. 19 (3): 313–329. doi:10.1080/19448953.2017.1277087.
- "Russia, China and 'Balance of Dependence' in Greater Eurasia". Russia in Global Affairs (3). 31 March 2017.
- "The EU, Russia and the Manichean Trap". Cambridge Review of International Affairs. 19 (3): 1–18.
- "The Global Resurgence of Economic Nationalism". Russia in Global Affairs. 21 December 2017.
- "The 'New Cold War' and its Impact on Chinese Geoeconomics". Russia in Global Affairs. 21 November 2018.
- Diesen, Glenn; Keane, Conor (2018). "The offensive posture of NATO's missile defense system". Communist and Post-Communist Studies. 51 (2): 92–103. doi:10.1016/j.postcomstud.2018.03.001.
- "The Geoeconomics of the Territorial Dispute between Russia and Japan". Asian Survey. 58 (3): 582–605. 2018. doi:10.1525/as.2018.58.3.582.
- Diesen, Glenn (2019). "The Geoeconomics of Russia's Greater Eurasia Initiative". Asian Politics & Policy. 11 (4): 566–585. doi:10.1111/aspp.12497.
- "The Disorderly Transition to a Multipolar World". New Perspectives. 27 (3): 25–29. 2019.
- Diesen, Glenn (2020). "Russia as an International Conservative Power: The Rise of Right-Wing Populists and their Affinity towards Russia". Journal of Contemporary European Studies. 28 (2): 182–196. doi:10.1080/14782804.2019.1705770.
- Diesen, Glenn (2021). "Europe as the Western Peninsula of Greater Eurasia". Journal of Eurasian Studies. 12 (1): 19–27. doi:10.1177/1879366521998240. hdl:11250/2989131.

== See also ==
- List of political scientists
- John Mearsheimer
- Realism (international relations)
