= Hegemony =

Political, economic or military predominance of one state over other states

Ancient Greece under the hegemony of Macedon: the kingdom of Macedonia (red) and the Hellenic league (yellow), 337-336 BC

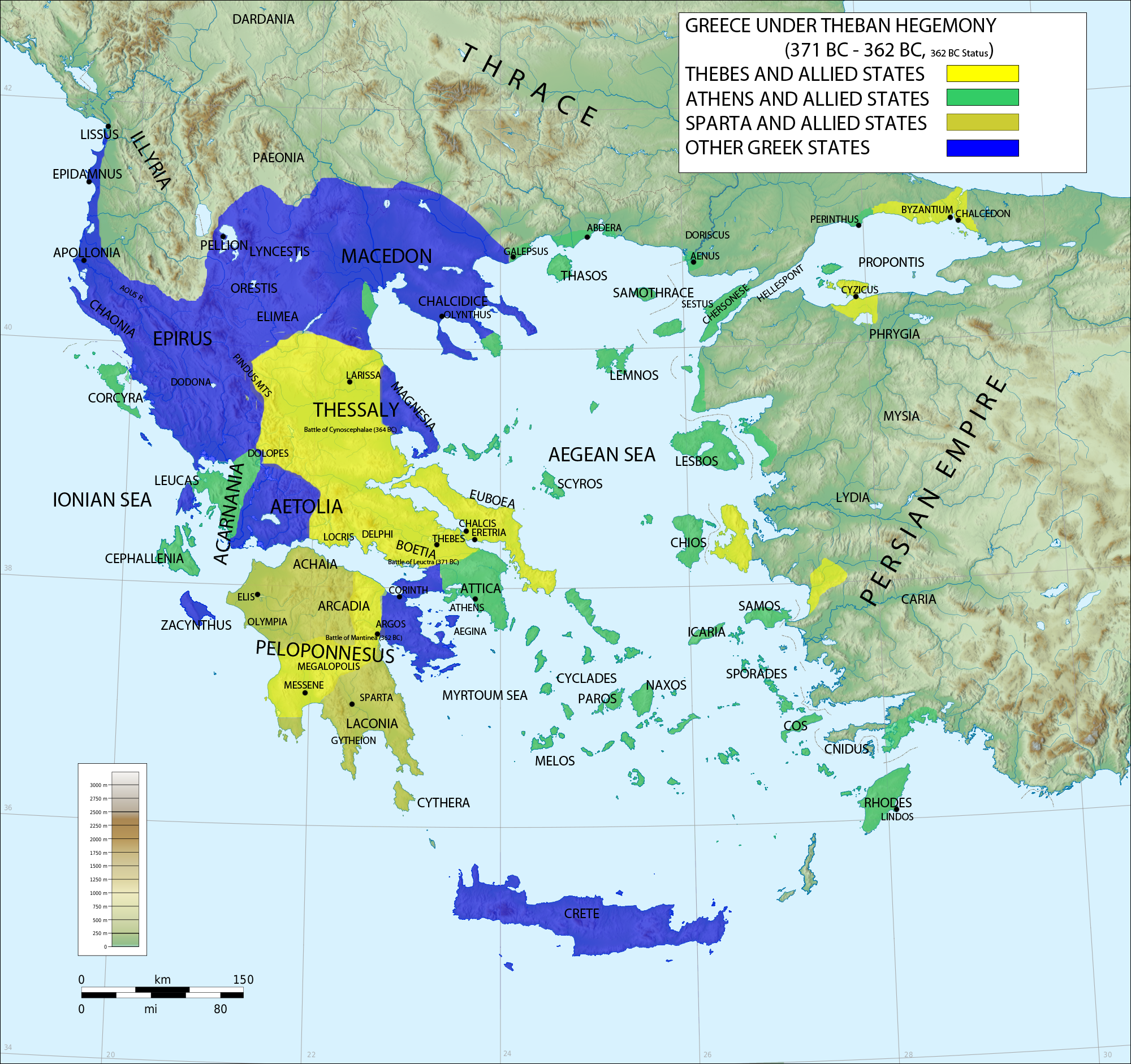
Ancient Greece under the Theban hegemony, 371–362 BC

In geopolitics, hegemony (/hɪˈdʒɛməni/, UK also /hɪˈɡɛməni/, US also /ˈhɛdʒəmoʊni/) is the political, economic and military predominance of one state over other states, either regional or global.

In Ancient Greece (ca. 8th BC – AD 6th c.), hegemony denotes the politico-military dominance of the hegemon city-state over other city-states. In the 19th century, hegemony denoted the "social or cultural predominance or ascendancy; predominance by one group within a society or milieu" and "a group or regime which exerts undue influence within a society."

In international relations theories, hegemony is distinguished from empire as ruling only external but not internal affairs of other states.

== Etymology ==
From the post-classical Latin word hēgemonia (1513 or earlier) from the Greek word ἡγεμονία, hēgemonía, 'authority, rule, political supremacy', related to the word ἡγεμών, hēgemṓn, 'leader'. Leadership, translated into Greek, renders hegemony; an alternative translation is archia – Greek common word for empire. Many scholars use the term "hegemony" interchangeably or synonymously with "empire" or "domination" and they are referred in the respective articles.

In theories of imperialism, the hegemonic order dictates the internal politics and the societal character of the subordinate states that constitute the hegemonic sphere of influence, either by an internal, sponsored government or by an external, installed government.

The term hegemonism denoted the geopolitical and the cultural predominance of one country over other countries, e.g., the hegemony of the Great Powers established with European colonialism in Africa, Asia, and Latin America.

== Political science ==
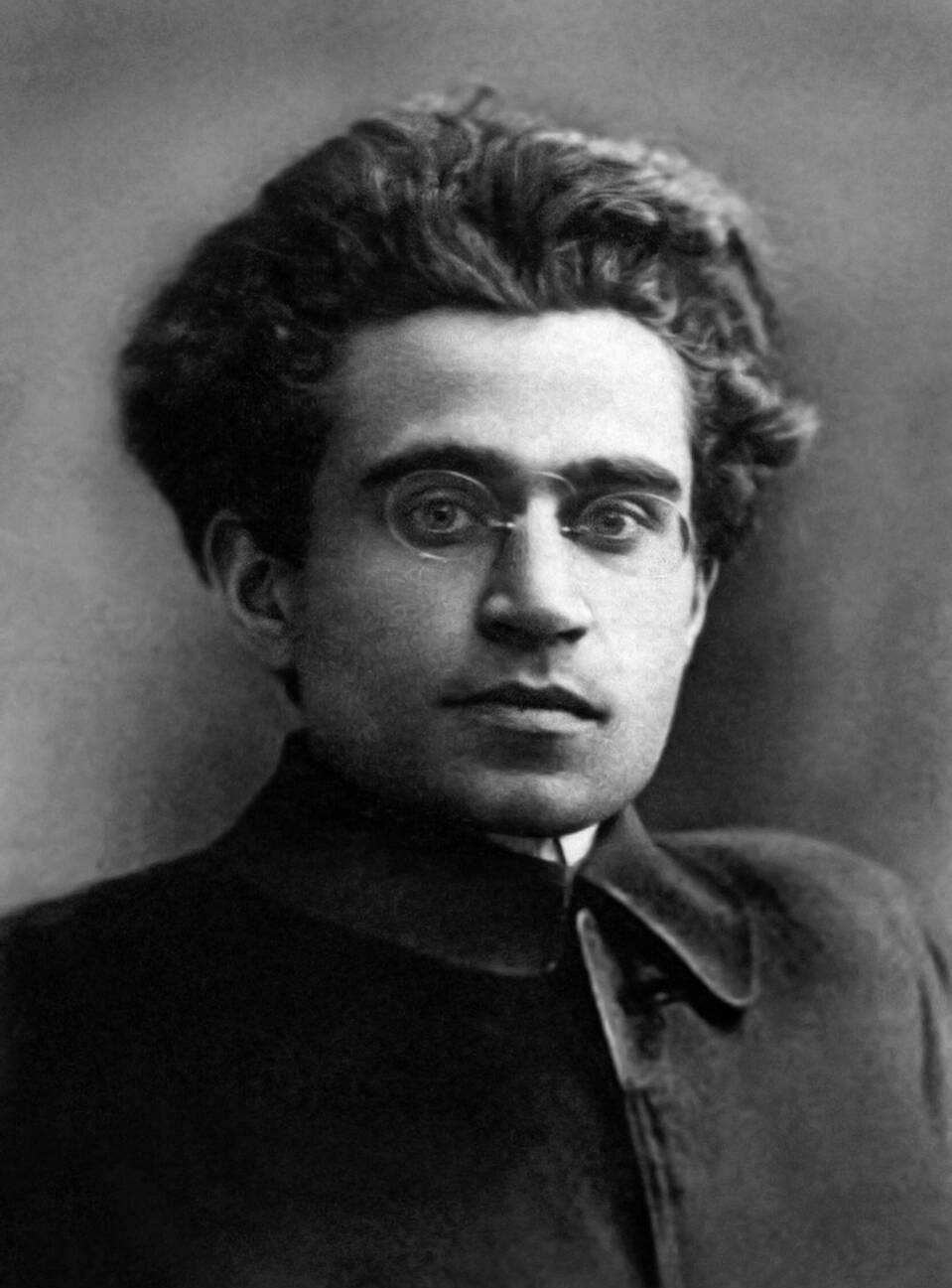
Antonio Gramsci (1891–1937), the theoretician of cultural hegemony

NATO countries account for over 70% of global military expenditure, with the United States alone accounting for 43% of global military expenditure in 2009.

In the historical writing of the 19th century, the denotation of hegemony extended to describe the predominance of one country upon other countries; and, by extension, hegemonism denoted the Great Power politics (c.1880s–1914) for establishing hegemony (indirect imperial rule), that then leads to a definition of imperialism (direct foreign rule).

In the early 20th century, the Italian Marxist philosopher Antonio Gramsci used the idea of hegemony to talk about politics within a given society. He developed the theory of cultural hegemony, an analysis of economic class (including social class) and how the ruling class uses consent as well as force to maintain its power.

Following this, Marxists and social scientists use the concept of cultural hegemony to analyze the social norms that established the social structures to impose their Weltanschauung (world view)—justifying the social, political, and economic status quo—as natural, inevitable, and beneficial to every social class, rather than as artificial social constructs beneficial solely to the ruling class.

From the Gramsci analysis derived the political science denotation of hegemony as leadership; thus, the historical example of Prussia as the militarily and culturally predominant province of the German Empire (1871–1918); and the personal and intellectual predominance of Napoleon Bonaparte upon the French Consulate (1799–1804).

More recently, in Hegemony and Socialist Strategy (1985), Ernesto Laclau and Chantal Mouffe defined hegemony as a political relationship of power wherein a subordinate society (collectivity) perform social tasks that are culturally unnatural and not beneficial to them, but that are in exclusive benefit to the imperial interests of the hegemon, the superior, ordinate power; hegemony is a military, political, and economic relationship that occurs as an articulation within political discourse.

== International relations ==
In the field of international relations, hegemony generally refers to the ability of an actor to shape the international system. Usually this actor is a state, such as Britain in the 19th century or the United States in the 20th century. A hegemon may shape the international system through coercive and non-coercive means. According to Nuno Monteiro, hegemony is distinct from unipolarity. The latter refers to a preponderance of power within an anarchic system, whereas the former refers to a hierarchical system where the most powerful state has the ability to "control the external behavior of all other states."

The English school of international relations takes a broader view of history. The research of Adam Watson was world-historical in scope. For him, hegemony was the most common order in history (historical "optimum") because many provinces of "frank" empires were under hegemonic rather than imperial rule. Watson summarized his life-long research: There was a spectrum of political systems ranging between multiple independent states and universal empire. The further a political system evolved towards one of the extremes, the greater was the gravitational pull towards the hegemonic center of the spectrum. Paul W. Schroeder drew a similar generalization that most empires involve informal, indirect rule.

Hegemony may take different forms. Benevolent hegemons provide public goods to the countries within their sphere of influence. Coercive hegemons exert their economic or military power to discipline unruly or free-riding countries in their sphere of influence. Exploitative hegemonies extract resources from other countries.

A prominent theory in International Relations focusing on the role of hegemonies is hegemonic stability theory. Its premise is that a hegemonic power is necessary to develop and uphold a stable international political and economic order. The theory was developed in the 1970s by Robert Gilpin and Stephen D. Krasner, among others. It has been criticized on both conceptual and empirical grounds. For example, Robert Keohane has argued that the theory is not a proper theory because it amounts to a series of allegedly redundant claims that apparently could not be used predictively.

A number of International Relations scholars have examined the decline of hegemons and their orders. For some, such decline tends to be disruptive because the stability that the hegemon provided gives way to a power vacuum. Others have maintained that cooperation may persist in the face of hegemonic decline because of institutions or enhanced contributions from non-hegemonic powers.

There has been a long debate in the field about whether American hegemony is in decline. As early as in the 1970s, Robert Gilpin suggested that the global order maintained by the United States would eventually decline as benefits from the public goods provided by Washington would diffuse to other states. In the 1980s, some scholars singled out Japan's economic growth and technological sophistication as a threat to U.S. primacy. More recently, analysts have focused on the economic and military rise of China and its challenge to U.S. hegemony.

Scholars differ as to whether bipolarity or unipolarity is likely to produce the most stable and peaceful outcomes. Kenneth Waltz and John Mearsheimer are among those who argue that bipolarity tends to generate relatively more stability, whereas John Ikenberry and William Wohlforth are among those arguing for the stabilizing impact of unipolarity. Some scholars, such as Karl Deutsch and J. David Singer argued that multipolarity was the most stable structure.

Scholars disagree about the sources and stability of U.S. unipolarity. Realist international relations scholars argue that unipolarity is rooted in the superiority of U.S. material power since the end of the Cold War. Liberal international relations scholar John Ikenberry attributes U.S. hegemony in part to what he says are commitments and self-restraint that the United States established through the creation of international institutions (such as the United Nations, International Monetary Fund, World Bank, and World Trade Organization). Constructivist scholar Martha Finnemore argues that legitimation and institutionalization are key components of unipolarity.

Anna Cornelia Beyer analysed the contemporary hegemony of the United States in the example of the Global War on Terrorism and presented the mechanisms and processes of American exercise of power in "hegemonic governance".

== Media and communications studies ==
Adopted from the work of Gramsci and Stuart Hall, in media studies and cultural studies hegemony refers to individuals or concepts that become most dominant in a culture. Building on Gramsci's ideas, Hall stated that the media is a critical institution for furthering or inhibiting hegemony.

Communications studies scholars have argued that in imperial dominance is established by means of cultural imperialism, whereby the leader state (hegemon) dictates the internal politics and the societal character of the subordinate states that constitute the hegemonic sphere of influence, either by an internal, sponsored government or by an external, installed government. The imposition of the hegemon's way of life—an imperial lingua franca and bureaucracies (social, economic, educational, governing)—transforms the concrete imperialism of direct military domination into the abstract power of the status quo, indirect imperial domination. J. Brutt-Griffler, a critic of this view, has described it as "deeply condescending" and "treats people ... as blank slates on which global capitalism's moving finger writes its message, leaving behind another cultural automaton as it moves on."

Culturally, hegemony also is established by means of language, specifically the imposed lingua franca of the hegemon (leader state), which then is the official source of information for the people of the society of the sub-ordinate state. Writing on language and power, Andrea Mayr says, "As a practice of power, hegemony operates largely through language." In contemporary society, an example of the use of language in this way is in the way Western countries set up educational systems in African countries mediated by Western languages.

== Historical examples ==
=== 30th–27th centuries BC ===
The political pattern of Sumer was hegemony shifting from city to city and called King of Kish. According to the Sumerian King List, Kish established the hegemony yet before the Flood. One of the earliest literary legacies of humankind, the Epic of Gilgamesh, is a case of anti-hegemonic resistance. Gilgamesh fights and overthrows the hegemon of his world.

=== 8th–3rd centuries BC ===
In the Greek world of 5th century BC, the city-state of Sparta was the hegemon of the Peloponnesian League (6th to 4th centuries BC) and King Philip II of Macedon was the hegemon of the League of Corinth in 337 BC, a kingship he willed to his son, Alexander the Great. Likewise, the role of Athens within the short-lived Delian League (478–404 BC) was that of a "hegemon", followed by the short-lived Spartan and Theban hegemonies. The super-regional Persian Achaemenid Empire of 550 BC–330 BC dominated these sub-regional hegemonies prior to its collapse. Ancient historians such as Herodotus (c. 484–425 BC). Xenophon (c. 431–354 BC) and Ephorus (c. 400–330 BC) pioneered the use of the term hēgemonía in the modern sense of hegemony.

In Ancient East Asia, Chinese hegemony existed during the Spring and Autumn period (c. 770–480 BC), when the weakened rule of the Eastern Zhou dynasty led to the relative autonomy of the Five Hegemons (Ba in Chinese [霸]). The term is translated as lord protector, or lord of the covenants, or chief of the feudal lords and is described as intermediate between king of independent state and Emperor of All under Heaven. The hegemons were appointed by feudal lord conferences and were nominally obliged to support the King of Zhou, whose status parallel to that of the Roman Pope in the medieval Europe.

In 364 BC, Qin emerged victorious from war and its Duke Xian (424–362 BC) was named hegemon by the King of Zhou. Qin rulers did not preserve the official title of hegemon but in fact kept the hegemony over their world: "For more than one hundred years [before 221 BC] Qin commanded eight lands and brought the lord of equal rank to its court." One of the six other great powers, Wei, was annexed as early as 324 BC. From the reign of Duke Xian on, "Qin gradually swallowed up the six [other] states until, after hundred years or so, the First Emperor was able to bring all kings under his power."

The century preceding the Qin's wars of unification in 221 BC was dominated by confrontation between the hegemonic horizontal alliance led by Qin and the anti-hegemonic alliance called perpendicular or vertical. "The political world appears as a chaos of ever-changing coalitions, but in which each new combination could ultimately be defined by its relation to Qin."

The first anti-hegemonic or perpendicular alliance was formed in 322 BC. Qin was supported by one state, Wei, which it had annexed two years previously. The remaining five great warring states of China joined in the anti-hegemonic coalition and attacked Qin in 318 BC. "Qin, supported by one annexed state, overwhelmed the world coalition." The same scenario repeated itself several times, until Qin decisively moved from hegemony to conquests and annexations in 221 BC.

=== 2nd century BC – 15th century AD ===
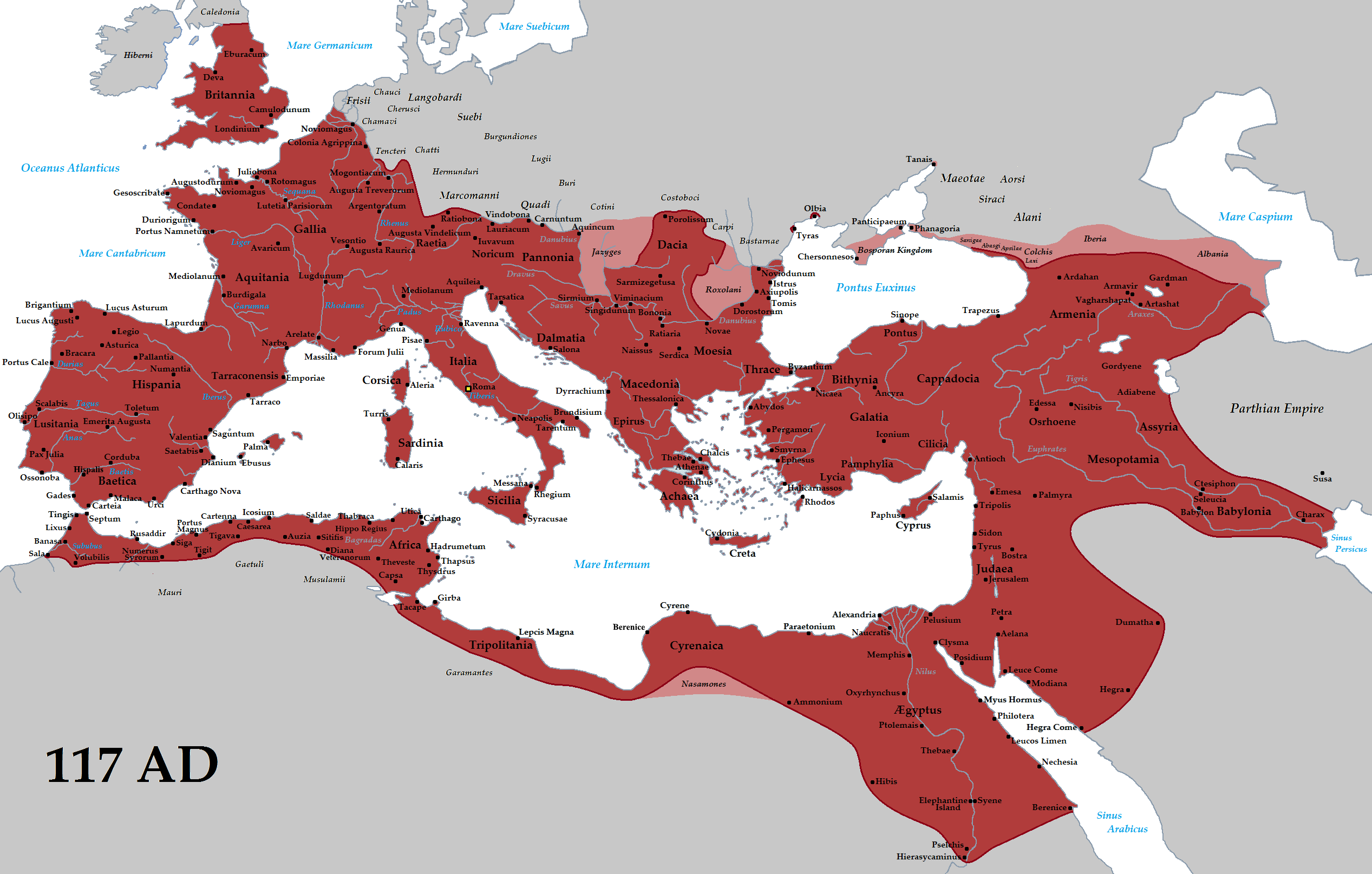
Roman Empire at its greatest extent, 117 AD

Rome established its hegemony over the entire Mediterranean after its victory over the Seleucid Empire in 189 BC. Officially, Rome's client states were outside the whole Roman imperium, and preserved their entire sovereignty and international rights and privileges. Edward Luttwak, in The Grand Strategy of the Roman Empire, outlined three stages, with hegemonic being the first, followed by imperial. In his view the transformation proved to be fatal and eventually led to the fall of the Roman Empire.

With few exceptions, the Roman treaties with client states (foedera) were formulized on equal terms without any expression of clientship and the Romans almost never used the word "client." The term "client king" is an invention of the post-Renaissance scholarship. Those who are conventionally called by modern historians of Rome "client kings" were referred to as "allies and friends" of the Roman people."Alliance" and "friendship," not any kind of subordination, bound them to Rome.

No regular or formal tribute was extracted from client states. The land of a client state could not officially be a basis for taxation. The overall fact is that, despite extensive conquests, the Romans did not settle down nor extracted revenues in any subdued territories between 200 and 148 BC. The first good evidence for regular taxation of another kingdom comes from Judea as late as 64 BC.

The Roman hegemony of the late Republic left to the Mediterranean kings internal autonomy and obliged them not to enter alliances hostile to Rome and not to wage offensive wars without consent of the Senate. Annexations usually followed when client kings broke this order (Macedonia in 148 BC and Pontus in 64 BC). In the course of these and other annexations, Rome gradually evolved from hegemony into empire. The last major client state of the Mediterranean—the Ptolemaic Kingdom—was annexed by Augustus in the very beginning of his reign in 30 BC.

Augustus initiated an unprecedented era of peace, shortly after his reign called Pax Romana. This peace however was imperial rather than hegemonic. Classic and modern scholars who call Pax Romana "hegemonic peace," use the term "hegemony" in its broader sense which includes both hegemony and empire.

From the 7th century to the 12th century, the Umayyad Caliphate and later Abbasid Caliphate dominated the vast territories they governed, with other states like the Byzantine Empire paying tribute.

In 7th-century India, Harsha, ruler of a large empire in northern India from AD 606 to 647, brought most of the north under his hegemony. He preferred not to rule as a central government, but left "conquered kings on their thrones and contenting himself with tribute and homage."

From the late 9th to the early 11th century, the empire developed by Charlemagne achieved hegemony in Europe, with dominance over France, most of Northern and Central Italy, Burgundy, and Germany.

From the 11th to the late 15th century the Italian maritime republics, in particular Venice and Genoa held hegemony in the Mediterranean, dominating trade between Europe and the Orient for centuries, and having naval supremacy. However, with the arrival of the Age of Discovery and the early modern period, they began to gradually lose their hegemony to other European powers.

=== 16th–19th centuries ===
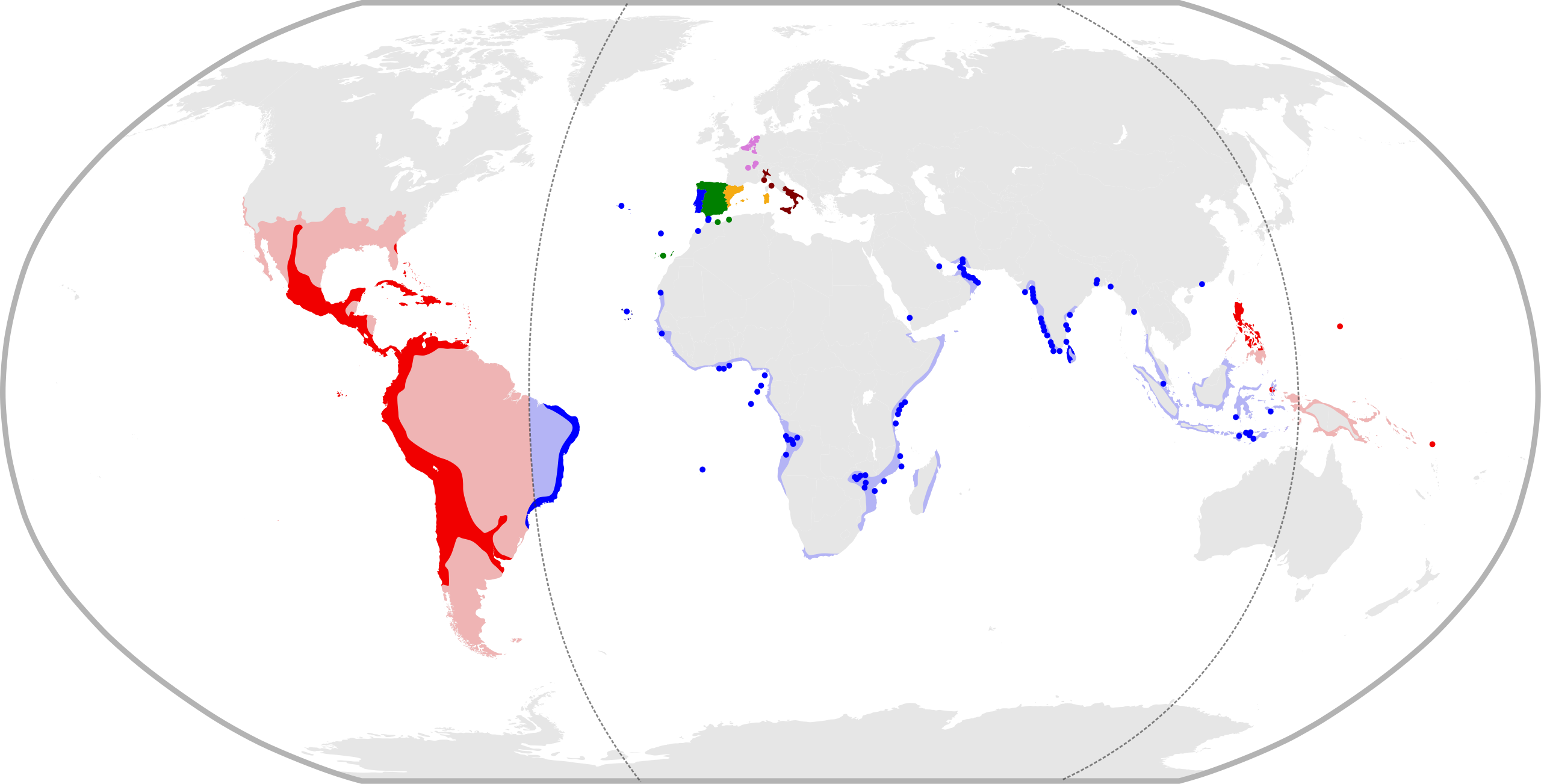
The Iberian Union in 1598, under Philip II, King of Spain and Portugal

European powers dominated global economic system from as early as the 15th century. Some of the powers attempted to shape world order in their own images. A succession of hegemonic contenders emerged during this period, with dominance based on preeminence in specific areas, and often with a district primary rival contesting their dominance, or two rivals allied to resist their dominance.

- Portugal 1494 to 1580 (from the end of the Italian Wars to Spanish–Portuguese Union)
  - Based on Portugal's dominance in navigation.
  - Primary rival: Habsburg Spain
- Spain 1516 to 1659 (from the accession of Charles I of Spain to the Treaty of the Pyrenees)
  - Based on the Spanish dominance of the European battlefields and the global exploration and colonization of the New World.
  - Primary rival: France under Louis XIV
- The Netherlands 1580 to 1688 (from the 1579 Treaty of Utrecht, which marks the foundation of the Dutch Republic, to the Glorious Revolution, William of Orange's arrival in England)
  - Based on Dutch control of credit and money.
  - Primary rival: France under Louis XIV
- France 1667 to 1688 (Reign of Louis XIV from the War of Devolution to Nine Years' War)
  - Based on military might and economic dominance in Continental Europe.
  - Primary rival: Britain
- Britain 1688 to 1792 (from the Glorious Revolution to the start of the French Revolutionary Wars)
  - Based on British textiles and command of the high seas.
  - Primary rival: France
- France 1789 to 1815 (Napoleonic France)
  - Based on military conquests, diplomatic alliances and propagation of modernized civil law.
  - Primary rivals: Britain, Prussia
- Britain 1815 to 1914 (from the Congress of Vienna to the start of the Great War)
  - Based on British industrial supremacy and railroads.
  - Primary rival: Prussia/Germany

Phillip IV tried to restore the Habsburg dominance but, by the middle of the 17th century, "Spain's pretensions to hegemony (in Europe) had definitely and irremediably failed."

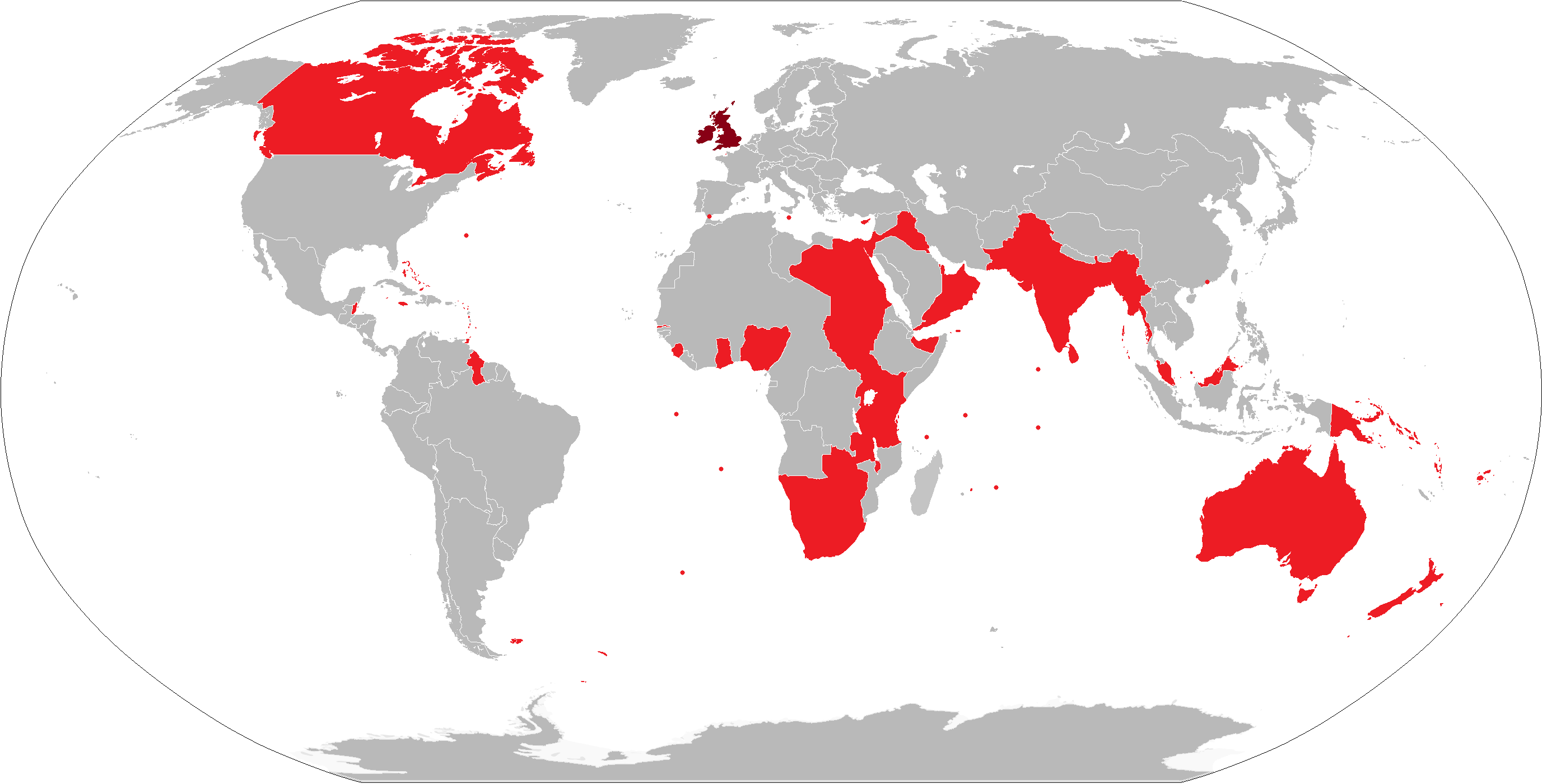
Map of the British Empire in 1922 (Minsar, Gambela and other colonial enclaves not shown). At its height, it was the largest empire in history.

In late 16th and 17th century Holland, the Dutch Republic's mercantilist dominion was an early instance of commercial hegemony, made feasible by the development of wind power for the efficient production and delivery of goods and services. This, in turn, made possible the Amsterdam stock market and concomitant dominance of world trade.

In France, King Louis XIV and Emperor Napoleon I (1799–1815) attempted true French hegemony via economic, cultural and military domination of most of Continental Europe. However, Jeremy Black writes that, because of Britain, France "was unable to enjoy the benefits" of this hegemony.

After the defeat and exile of Napoleon, hegemony largely passed to the British Empire, which became the largest empire in history, with Queen Victoria (1837–1901) ruling over one-quarter of the world's land and population at its zenith. Like the Dutch, the British Empire was primarily seaborne; many British possessions were located around the rim of the Indian Ocean, as well as numerous islands in the Pacific Ocean and the Caribbean Sea. Britain also controlled the Indian subcontinent and large portions of Africa.

In Europe, Germany, rather than Britain, may have been the strongest power after 1871, but Samuel Newland writes:

Bismarck defined the road ahead as… no expansion, no push for hegemony in Europe. Germany was to be the strongest power in Europe but without being a hegemon. …His basic axioms were first, no conflict among major powers in Central Europe; and second, German security without German hegemony."

These fluctuations form the basis for cyclical theories by George Modelski and Joshua S. Goldstein, both of whom allege that naval power is vital for hegemony.

=== 20th century ===
The Soviet Union and the United States dominated world affairs during the Cold War.

The early 20th century, like the late 19th century, was characterized by multiple Great Powers but no global hegemon. World War I strengthened the United States and, to a lesser extent, Japan. Both of these states' governments pursued policies to expand their regional spheres of influence, the U.S. in Latin America and Japan in East Asia. France, the UK, Italy, Soviet Union and later Nazi Germany (1933–1945) all either maintained imperialist policies based on spheres of influence or attempted to conquer territory but none achieved the status of a global hegemonic power.

After the Second World War, the United Nations was established and the five strongest global powers (China, France, UK, US and USSR) were given permanent seats on the UN Security Council, the organization's most powerful decision-making body. The war also completed the United States hegemony in Latin America as the most resistive states, Argentina and Chile had to give in.

Following the war, the US and the USSR were the two strongest global powers and this created a bi-polar power dynamic in international affairs, commonly referred to as the Cold War. American hegemony during this time has been described as "Empire by invitation". The hegemonic conflict was ideological (between communism and capitalism), as well as geopolitical (between Warsaw Pact countries (1955–1991) and NATO/SEATO/CENTO countries (1949–present/1954–1977/1955–1979)). During the Cold War, both hegemons competed against each other directly (during the arms race) and indirectly (via proxy wars). The result was that many countries, no matter how remote, were drawn into the conflict when it was suspected that their government's policies might destabilize the balance of power. Reinhard Hildebrandt calls this a period of "dual-hegemony," where "two dominant states have been stabilizing their European spheres of influence against and alongside each other." Proxy wars became battle grounds between forces supported either directly or indirectly by the hegemonic powers and included the Korean War, Laotian Civil War, Arab–Israeli conflict, Vietnam War, Afghan War, Angolan Civil War, and the Central American Civil Wars.

Following the dissolution of the Soviet Union in 1991, the United States was the world's sole hegemonic power.

=== 21st century ===
Various perspectives on whether the United States was or continues to be a hegemon have been presented since the end of the Cold War. American political scientists John Mearsheimer and Joseph Nye have argued that the United States, is not a genuine global hegemon because it has neither the financial nor the military resources to impose a proper, formal global hegemony and cannot achieve many security, political and economic goals alone. This theory is contested in academic discussions of international relations.

Nye opened his 2002 book, The Paradox of American Power with: "Not since Rome has one nation loomed so large above the others." Among his other titles were "The New Rome Meets the New Barbarians," where "New Rome" means the United States, and Bound to Lead, where the bound-to-lead entity is the United States. According to Mearsheimer, global hegemony is unlikely due to the difficulties in projecting power over large bodies of water. International Relations (IR) author Max Ostrovsky wrote:

Disregarding recent (since 1492 AD) events, the hypothesis makes sense. In 1281, water and the "good wind" (kamikaze) indeed stopped the Mongols on the way to Japan. Later, however, even with all sorts of kamikaze, water ceased to stop. In 1945, the citizens of Hamburg and Dresden, Berlin and Tokyo, Hiroshima and Nagasaki (those who survived), would not describe water power as stopping; certainly not the double habakusha—those who survived in Hiroshima on August 6 and within next two days managed to reach Nagasaki. Had Mearsheimer arranged a poll of double habakushas on August 10, "Does, in your opinion, water power stop?" he would have collected unanimous negative, not necessarily literal, replies. Just the day before the anniversary of the original kamikaze (August 15), the Japanese announced the unconditional surrender. They knew: water will not stop. Not this time.

The French Socialist politician Hubert Védrine in 1999 described the United States as a hegemonic hyperpower, because of its unilateral military actions worldwide. The United States' role is often described as hegemonic in NATO and other US-led military alliances.

Further information: List of countries with highest military expenditures

Military spending, top 25 countries by % GDP, 2024
Country	% GDP spent on military
Ukraine	34.5
Israel	8.8
Algeria	8.0
Saudi Arabia	7.3
Russia	7.1
Myanmar	6.8
Oman	5.6
Armenia	5.5
Azerbaijan	5.0
Kuwait	4.8
Jordan	4.8
Burkina Faso	4.7
Mali	4.2
Poland	4.2
Burundi	3.8
Brunei	3.6
Morocco	3.5
United States	3.4
Estonia	3.4
Colombia	3.4
Latvia	3.3
Greece	3.1
Lithuania	3.1
Chad	3.0
Kyrgyzstan	3.0

Military spending, top 25 countries by PPP, 2024
Country	$billions spent on military
United States	997
China	567
Russia	401
India	308
Ukraine	183
South Korea	96
Germany	99
Japan	91
France	91
United Kingdom	86
Brazil	64
Poland	62
Italy	60
Turkey	59
Indonesia	47
Colombia	43
Mexico	40
Spain	39
Australia	31
Canada	31
Netherlands	21
Philippines	21
Romania	21
Greece	17
Malaysia	14

In 2006, author Zhu Zhiqun claimed that China is already on the way to becoming the world hegemon and that the focus should be on how a peaceful transfer of power can be achieved between the U.S. and China, but has faced opposition to this claim. In an article published in 2019, two academics from Green School of International and Public Affairs argued that a "third‐way hegemony" or Dutch‐style hegemony apart from a peaceful or violent hegemonic rise may be the most feasible option to describe China in its global hegemony in the future.

The Russo-Georgian War was interpreted as an anti-hegemonic resistance by the Russian geopolitical thinker, Alexander Dugin (the theorist of Russian neo-Eurasianism and influential on Russian ruler Vladimir Putin): "Here is the border in the battle of civilizations. I think Americans are great. But we want to put an end to America's hegemony." For Fabrizio Vielmini, writing for the Italian think tank Institute for International Political Studies, the war marked a turning point from the hegemonic order the United States tried to enforce for the first two post-Cold War decades. The Russo-Georgian War was seen by some analysts as a landmark event, with the Wests muted response inviting Russia to acts of ever bolder aggression. In 2014, Russia conquered and annexed Crimea, and in 2022 launched a full-scale invasion of Ukraine and annexed four more Ukrainian regions. Pro-Putin analyst Glenn Diesen saw the Russian invasion as the "graveyard of liberal hegemony."

Following the annexations, Putin stated that the breakdown of the Western hegemony passed the point of no return, and that the post-Cold War hegemonic world order will not be back. He often justifies the ongoing war with Ukraine as an “anti-hegemonic” struggle and calls a wider international community to join this struggle. Two days after Donald Trump was reelected US President, Putin celebrated the "crumbling hegemonic world,” saying the stream of history runs counter to the strivings of the West: "No hegemony can be a consideration in the new international environment." Following the 2025 Trump–Zelenskyy Oval Office meeting and the turmoil caused by Trump's tariffs policy and expansionist proposals, Russian official agencies celebrated victory over the hegemony. "Putin quietly finished the Hegemon off," was one newspaper title. This geopolitical victory, it says, is underestimated as Putin has attained what earlier had seemed fantastic, when Russia launched this process to defend its sovereignty from the hegemony.

A pamphlet published by the Chinese Ministry of Foreign Affairs in 2023 states the US hegemony as existing since the end of the Cold War, and claims that the United States' consistent abuse of its hegemony imperils the world. The Ministry referred to a composition of US military interventions by country. This composition, the Ministry said, omits three countries (of 194 UN member states) where the US was not militarily involved: Andorra, Liechtenstein and Bhutan. The Ministry supposed that they were "spared because the US did not find them on the map.” Chinese official agencies frequently publish such pamphlets claiming to be against “hegemony.”

According to Michael Ignatieff in 2024, both China and Russia may believe that there will never be a more opportune moment to overthrow American hegemony. By 2025, this possibility became more relevant as Donald Trump came to power, adopted a more pro-Russian line, halted aid to Ukraine and Taiwan, and took a more aggressive attitude towards other allies including Canada. With “uneasy feeling” of facing “Anschluss,” Ignatieff found the moment opportune for designing an anti-hegemonic “common front” with Europe and Latin America.

In January 2026, Prime Minister of Canada Mark Carney spoke at the World Economic Forum annual meeting in Davos, where he declared that international economic partnerships were "in the midst of a rupture, not a transition," that the time of the rules-based global order was over, and that the middle powers must act together to avoid being victimized by American hegemony. Carney received a standing ovation for his speech, unusual for World Economic Forum meetings.

Stephen Walt argued in a 2025 International Security article that the prospects of Chinese regional hegemony were slim due to the strong likelihood of a balancing coalition against China in Asia. However, in a May 2026 article, Walt revisited his argument, saying he underestimated just how impulsive, misguided, and incompetent President Donald Trump would be, and that the prospects for Chinese regional hegemony looked better.

== See also ==
- Colonialism
- Cultural hegemony
- Dominant ideology
- Global policeman
- Hegemonic masculinity
- Hegemonic stability theory
- Imperialism, the Highest Stage of Capitalism
- Manufacturing Consent
- Media hegemony
- Monetary hegemony
- Post-hegemony
- Regional hegemony
- Soft power
- State collapse
- Superpower
- Supremacism
