= Muawiyah's hair =

Arabic expression and political metaphor

Mu'awiya's hair (Arabic: شعرة معاوية, romanized: shaʿrat Muʿāwiya), also rendered as the hair of Mu'awiya, is an Arabic expression and political metaphor associated with Mu'awiya I. It describes maintaining a relationship through a flexible balance of firmness and accommodation, yielding when the other side applies pressure and applying pressure when the other side yields. Translation scholar Abdali H. Al-Saidi gives the literal meaning as "Muawiya's (single) hair" and identifies its figurative sense with Mu'awiya's political method.

== Origin ==
The expression derives from a maxim attributed to Mu'awiya I, the founder and first caliph of the Umayyad Caliphate. Historian Philip K. Hitti described Mu'awiya's political skill as one of "political finesse" and cited the maxim as an illustration of his approach to government. The saying is commonly rendered:

If there were only a hair between me and the people, it would never break. If they pulled it, I would loosen it; if they loosened it, I would pull it.

The metaphor expresses the idea of responding to pressure with flexibility and to relaxation with firmness, thereby preserving a relationship without allowing it to break.

== Modern usage ==
The expression continues to be used as a metaphor for preserving political and diplomatic relationships through a calculated balance of pressure and accommodation. Former United States diplomat Chas W. Freeman Jr. invoked "Muawiya's hair" in a 2014 Carnegie Council discussion of diplomacy, describing it as part of the legacy of Islamic statecraft and interpreting the maxim as a principle of maintaining contact, influence, and dialogue with an adversary.

Freeman again invoked the concept in a 2026 interview with political scientist Glenn Diesen during the ongoing 2026 Iran war, in the context of maintaining diplomatic lines of communication during wartime.
