= Peace and Justice (Norway) =

Peace and Justice Fred og Rettferdighet
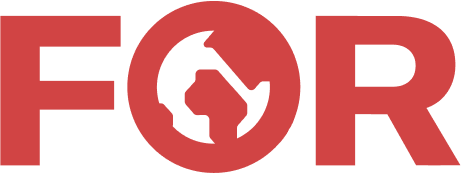
- Leader: Marielle Leraand
- Founded: May 2023
- Registered: 6 November 2024
- Split from: Red Party
- Headquarters: Oslo, Norway

Website
- partiet-for.no

Peace and Justice (Norwegian: Fred og Rettferdighet, FOR) is a Norwegian political party registered in 2024. It was founded in May 2023 by Marielle Leraand, the former deputy leader of the Red Party, after the Red Party supported Norwegian arms deliveries to Ukraine in its national convention following the Russian invasion of Ukraine. Peace and Justice ran in all 19 constituencies in the 2025 Norwegian parliamentary election.

The party's name and inspiration come from Jeremy Corbyn's Peace & Justice Project. It has opposed Norwegian arms deliveries to Ukraine, due to its anti-war and pacifist values. The party is also opposed to NATO and the EU.

It has been accused of promoting pro-Russian policies and Russian disinformation narratives during the Russian invasion of Ukraine. Since its founding in 2023, the party has come under scrutiny for its funding ties to Atle Berge, who financed the party’s high-profile 2025 pro-Russian election campaign that attacked Norwegian support for Ukraine. One of the party's main candidates and the figurehead of the election campaign, Glenn Diesen, has been criticized for promoting Russian propaganda for several years.

FOR's youth party, named Young Anti-Imperialism, was founded during the party's national convention in May 2025.

== Views and policies ==
The party has positioned itself as pacifist and opposes Norwegian military aid to Ukraine. It asserts that Russia’s war was triggered by NATO's goal of taking Ukraine as a member, and can be stopped by abandoning this goal.

It supports boycotts of Israel, which it sees as an apartheid state, arguing that Israel is racist and contributes to Islamophobia and makes false claims about antisemitism against its critics.

It wants to give asylum to Edward Snowden and other whistleblowers.

It opposes the EU, EEA, NATO and other "undemocratic supranational bodies" and believes that free immigration from the EU leads to social dumping. It is against American military bases in Norway and claims that slimming down the military budget can finance welfare benefits such as free dental care, free kindergarten and after-school care, free school meals and all sports and cultural activities for children and young people.

It wants to close down the Norwegian Police Security Service and Norwegian Intelligence Service. It is against oil exploration and believes that renewable energy can only be built where this does not conflict with nature conservation. It wants the Sámi Parliament to be given the right of veto against all encroachments on nature in traditional Sámi lands.

The party has been accused of adopting a rhetoric that aligns closely with Russia's justifications for its invasion of Ukraine. Peace and Justice has drawn sharp criticism from across the Norwegian political spectrum, including accusations of operating as a de facto conduit for Russian disinformation operations in Norway. Critics argue that the party's messaging serves to undermine Western unity and public support for Ukraine by promoting false equivalences and relativizing Russia's aggression. Numerous political commentators and members of parliament have accused Peace and Justice of acting as a mouthpiece for Russian interests. Jørn Sund-Henriksen, the leader of the Norwegian-Ukrainian friendship association, characterizes the party as a Russian proxy operating within the framework of hybrid warfare. He argues that its messaging, activities, funding, and use of Russian disinformation align with known Russian intelligence strategies aimed at eroding public trust, destabilizing democratic institutions, and weakening support for Ukraine.

Mulonda Rashidi, the leader of FOR's youth party, Young Anti-Imperialism, has expressed support for North Korea, which he described as "one of the freest and most democratic countries in the world."

The party has received praise from the neo-Nazi organization Vigrid.

== Campaigning and funding ==
In May 2025, Peace and Justice launched an expensive and controversial advertising campaign for the 2025 Norwegian parliamentary election on Oslo's public transport network with pictures of Leraand (candidate for the constituency of Oslo) and Glenn Diesen (candidate for constituency of Akershus), criticizing Norway's financial and military support for Ukraine. The campaign, which featured slogans opposing the government's 85 billion-kroner aid package to Ukraine, was widely denounced as a propaganda stunt. The party initially refused to disclose who had financed the 1.4 million kroner campaign, later revealed to be controversial Russian-based billionaire Atle Berge. The incident triggered an investigation by the Norwegian Party Law Committee, which found that it all seem to be done according to Norwegian law. The advertising posters for FOR on the subway in Oslo were torn down in many places shortly after they were hung up. Mathilde Tybring-Gjedde of the Conservative Party described the party’s advertisements as “an echo of Russian propaganda,” a sentiment echoed in national media coverage.

== Election results ==
=== Storting ===
| Election | Leader | Votes | % | Seats | +/– | Position | Status |
|---|---|---|---|---|---|---|---|
| 2025 | Marielle Leraand | 9,430 | 0.29 | 0 / 169 | New | 15th | Extra-parliamentary |
