= Atle Berge =

Norwegian businessman based in Russia

Atle Berge (born 1952) is a Norwegian businessman. Though a Norwegian citizen by birth, Berge lives in Russia, where he has longstanding business interests and maintains a pro-Kremlin stance on geopolitical issues. He is the main funder of the pro-Russian party Fred og Rettferdighet in Norway. He supports the Russian invasion of Ukraine. He was once arrested by FSB, suspected of being a Norwegian spy.

== Business activities ==
Berge built his fortune through the family-owned concrete company Ølen Betong Gruppen, which expanded into Murmansk, Russia, in 2008. The company established a concrete factory there as part of its international ambitions. However, in the years following Russia's escalation of hostilities in Ukraine, Ølen Betong Gruppen officially withdrew from its Russian operations.

Despite this, Berge personally retained his business interests in the country. In 2023, he took over full ownership of the Murmansk factory through a separate company under his direct control, effectively continuing operations independently of the Norwegian parent firm. Berge now serves as director of the Murmansk-based business, managing its activities from within Russia, where he has stated he both lives and works.

He states that he lives "like a count" in Russia. Berge has said that he is in the process of acquiring Russian citizenship and expects to get a Russian passport "in a while."

Despite the sanctions against Russia, Berge says that he transfers money from Russia to Norway, and that he has a method for circumventing the sanctions regime.

== Arrest by FSB ==
Berge was arrested in 2016 by FSB in Russia, accused of being a Norwegian spy, after the Norwegian PST had -unsuccessfully- tried to recruit him. His company sued the Norwegian state for 145 million NOK, for loss of income, but lost.

== Support for pro-Russian propaganda ==
Berge became the focus of public outrage in 2025 after it was revealed that he had donated a multi-million-krone sum to Fred og Rettferdighet, a fringe pro-Russian political party known for opposing Western aid to Ukraine. The party's advertising campaign, which included over 8,000 posters across Oslo’s public transport system, was widely condemned as pro-Russian propaganda. The source of funding was initially concealed, prompting an investigation by Norwegian authorities. The incident triggered an investigation by the Norwegian Party Law Committee, which found that it all seemed to be done according to Norwegian law.

In 2025, in response to a Facebook post by Ukrainian Freedom Convoys, a Norwegian organization delivering 11 cars to Ukrainian soldiers; two of which were going to be ambulances, Berge commented: "Lots of good bomb targets". The comment was widely interpreted as a call for Russian forces to bomb convoys operated by Norwegian civilians delivering ambulances. It sparked outrage among politicians and civil society. Berge later clarified: "The meaning must have been that if a lot of beautiful vehicles come to Ukraine, then that's something the warring parties would like to hit. That's how it has to be perceived."

Berge implied he is an informant for Russian authorities, stating that he had meetings with "high powers in Russia" and mentioning discussions of a specific Norwegian journalist, Thomas Nilsen. Nilsen said that "my clear impression is that this is about the FSB, and the message is very clear: Berge is exchanging information with Russian intelligence and is talking about named Norwegian citizens with them."

Berge claimed that the United States started the war in Ukraine. He also supports Donald Trump, stating that it was "very good that Trump becomes president in the USA."

Berge said that his relationship with Russia has destroyed his relations in Norway, including his relations with his children. Ølen Betong, which is now owned by Berge's children, released a press release emphasizing that they have no connection with Berge today and distanced themselves from both his "message and political position." Ølen Betong also said, that it would end Berge's use of an email address linked to the company. Finansavisen reported that Ølen Betong was built by Berge into a company valued at 2.5 billion kroner, but due to his sympathies for Russia, he was forced to step away from the business and sever ties with his family, receiving "only" 120 million kroner in compensation. The outlet described the situation as a "bitter family feud" behind a controversial donation to the party Fred og rettferdighet.

== Support for orphanage for abducted children ==
In 2024, Atle Berge faced sharp criticism for providing financial support to a Russian orphanage housing children from Russian-occupied territories of Ukraine. Human rights organizations and UN observers have reported that thousands of Ukrainian children have been illegally abducted to Russia, where many are placed in institutions such as the one supported by Berge. According to the Norwegian Helsinki Committee, such support risks legitimizing the Russian war effort by reinforcing propaganda that portrays the forced relocation of Ukrainian children as humanitarian rescue. Inna Sangadzhieva of the committee emphasized that children in these orphanages are often subjected to "militarizing measures" and Russian indoctrination, including forced uniform use and the suppression of Ukrainian identity. She warned that Berge becomes a pawn in this strategy. Despite these concerns, Berge dismissed the accusations as "Western propaganda, describing Norway's stance on the war as "a catastrophe" and calling Prime Minister Støre "an idiot." When questioned by NRK, he declined an interview and accused the journalist of being "enormously Russophobic."
