= Patrik Oksanen =

Swedish journalist

- Born: 1973 (age 51–52); Gothenburg, Sweden
- Occupation: Journalist
- Awards: Member of the Royal Swedish Academy of War Sciences

Patrik Oksanen (born 1973) is a Swedish journalist and writer. He formerly served as the Europe correspondent of Sveriges Television. Since 2015 he hosts the podcast series Podd72 on security policy, defense and information warfare. He was elected as a fellow of the Royal Swedish Academy of War Sciences in 2020.

He was born in 1973 in Gothenburg.
