= Thomas Nilsen =

Norwegian journalist

Thomas Nilsen (born 29 August 1968) is a Norwegian journalist who has extensively covered oil drilling in the Arctic region. He was editor of the BarentsObserver, a Norwegian Arctic online newspaper based in Kirkenes, for six years before he was sacked in 2015. Norway’s public service broadcaster, NRK, claim Nilsen was sacked at the behest of the Russian intelligence service, the FSB.

== Life and work ==
Nilsen studied at the Norwegian University of Science and Technology in Trondheim, Norway.

He has been an environmental campaigner and guide for adventure tours.

He worked for 12 years for the Bellona Foundation's Russian study group, focusing on nuclear safety issues and other environmental challenges in northern areas including the Arctic. In 1996 he cowrote The Russian Northern Fleet: Sources of Radioactive Contamination with Igor Kudrik and Alexander Nikitin, a report on the environmental hazards of disused and decaying nuclear-powered submarines of the Russian Navy's Northern Fleet.

Beginning in 2003, Nilsen worked for thirteen years for the Norwegian Barents Secretariat (NBS), a "local government body that promotes good relations with Russia in a region where the two nations cooperate and compete over fishing, oil and military strategy". From 2003 to 2009 he was its information officer and deputy head. From 2009 to 2015 he was editor of the BarentsObserver, a Norwegian Arctic online newspaper based in Kirkenes, published by NBS. Kirkenes is in the extreme northeastern part of Norway, on the edge of a vast bay connected to the Barents Sea, near the Russian–Norwegian border. The town is about 400 kilometres (250 mi) north of the Arctic Circle. According to the BBC it is a "tiny bubble of cross-border friendship in a Nato country".

In 2014 Mikhail Noskov, the Russian consul-general (Russian government representative in Norway) who was also based in Kirkenes, criticised Nilsen’s writing and warned that it might damage relations between Russia and Norway. On 28 September 2015 Nilsen was sacked from his position as editor. Norway’s public service broadcaster, NRK, has claimed he was sacked at the behest of the Russian intelligence service, the FSB.

== Publications ==
- Sources to Radioactive Contamination in Murmansk and Arkhangel'sk Counties. Bellona report, vol. 1. Oslo: Bellona Foundation, 1994. OCLC 37825869. By Nilsen and Nils Bohmer. English-language text.
- Reprocessing Plants in Siberia. Bellona working paper, no. 4. Oslo: Bellona, 1995. OCLC 35845759. By Nilsen and Nils Bohmer. Also available in Norwegian and Russian-language text.
- Zapadnaya Litsa. Bellona working paper, no. 5. Oslo: Bellona, 1995. OCLC 35847896. By Nilsen, Igor Kudrik and Alexander Nikitin. Also available in Norwegian and Russian-language text.
- The Russian Northern Fleet: Sources of Radioactive Contamination. By Nilsen, Igor Kudrik and Alexander Nikitin. (Note: The full text of the report can be read here at the St. Petersburg Open Network, and a version in PDF format can be read here at the International Atomic Energy Agency site.)
  - Den Russiske Nordflaten: Kilder til Radioaktiv Forurensning. Oslo: Bellona, 1996. ISBN 9788202162122.
  - The Russian Northern Fleet: Sources of Radioactive Contamination. Oslo; Washington, D.C.: Bellona, 1996. OCLC 35747733.
  - Den Russiske Nordflåten: Kilder til Radioaktiv Forurensning. Bellona Rapport, 1996 nr. 2. Oslo J.W. Cappelen; Bellona, 1996. ISBN 9788202162122.
  - La Flotte Russe du Nord: les Sources de la Pollution Radioactive. Rapport Bellona, Tome 2, 1996. Geneva: Georg Editeur, 1998. ISBN 9782825705889.

== See also ==
- Norway–Russia relations
