= Sven G. Holtsmark =

Norwegian historian (born 1959)

- Born: 1959 (age 66–67)

Academic background
- Education: University of Oslo

Academic work
- Discipline: History
- Institutions: Norwegian Institute for Defence Studies
- Main interests: Foreign relations of the Soviet Union, Russian foreign policy

Sven Gabriel Holtsmark (born 8 August 1959) is a Norwegian historian and Russian studies scholar. He is a full professor (chair) of history at the Norwegian Institute for Defence Studies, and formerly served as its director (2005–2006 and 2012–2017). Holtsmark has primarily worked on Soviet, Russian, and East German politics and foreign policy, as well as Norwegian and Nordic foreign and security policy history. He has contributed to the understanding of Norway's relations with the Soviet Union and Russia, particularly in the context of the High North and the Arctic. Holtsmark is a frequent commentator on defence policy and Russian foreign and military policy in Norwegian media, including on the Russian invasion of Ukraine. Holtsmark has publicly criticized fellow academics whom he believes promote narratives aligned with Russian propaganda, particularly in the context of the 2022 invasion of Ukraine.

He holds a cand. philol. degree from the University of Oslo, earned in 1988. He was a research fellow at the Norwegian Research Council for Science and the Humanities from 1989 to 1990, a researcher at the Norwegian Institute for Defence Studies (IFS) from 1990, a senior researcher from 1993, and became professor of history in 2003.

== Selected bibliography ==
- Odd Arne Westad, Sven Holtsmark, Iver B. Neumann (eds.), The Soviet Union in Eastern Europe, 1945–1989. London, Macmillan, 1994
- "DDR i norsk politikk 1949-1973: Myter og virkelighet", in Thomas Wegener Friis & Sven Linderoth (ed): DDR og Norden, Odense 2005.
- with Helge Ø. Pharo and Rolf Tamnes (ed.): Motstrøms. Olav Riste og norsk internasjonal historieskrivning, Oslo (Cappelen Akademisk Forlag), 2003.
- Avmaktens diplomati. DDR i Norge 1949-1973, Oslo (HiFO) 1999.
