= Aubervilliers =

- Commune
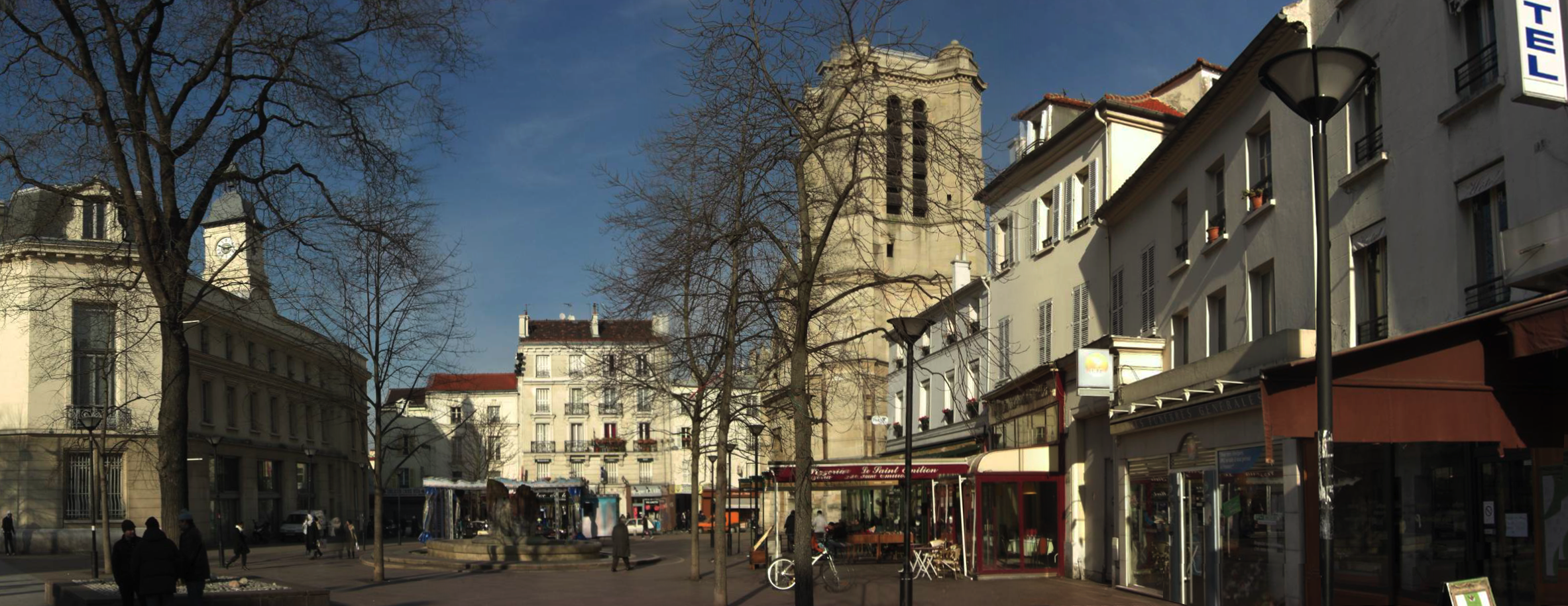
- Town Centre

- Coat of arms
- Location of Aubervilliers
- Location within France Location within Île-de-France (region)
- Coordinates: 48°54′47″N 2°22′59″E
- Country: France
- Region: Île-de-France
- Department: Seine-Saint-Denis
- Arrondissement: Saint-Denis
- Canton: Aubervilliers
- Intercommunality: Grand Paris; EPT Plaine Commune

Government
  - Mayor (2026–32): Sofienne Karroumi
- Area^{1}: 5.76 km^{2} (2.22 sq mi)
- Highest elevation: 46 m (151 ft)
- Lowest elevation: 33 m (108 ft)
- Population (2023): 88,365
  - Density: 15,300/km^{2} (39,700/sq mi)
- Time zone: UTC+01:00 (CET)
  - Summer (DST): UTC+02:00 (CEST)
- INSEE/Postal code: 93001 /93300
- ^{1} French Land Register data, which excludes lakes, ponds, glaciers > 1 km^{2} (0.386 sq mi or 247 acres) and river estuaries.

Aubervilliers (French pronunciation: [obɛʁvilje]) is a commune in the Seine-Saint-Denis department, Île-de-France region, northeastern suburbs of Paris, France.

== Geography ==
=== Localisation ===
Aubervilliers in the Paris Urban Area.

Aubervilliers is one of three communes in the Plaine Saint-Denis, 7.2 km (4.5 mi) north-east of the centre of Paris.

The Canal Saint-Denis traverses the commune on the western side from north to south.

=== Transport and communications ===
Aubervilliers is a commune close to Paris and has numerous means of transport including: the A86 autoroute from L'Île-Saint-Denis in the west to Drancy in the east with Exit 9 on the northern border of the commune, Route nationale N301 from Stains in the north and joining the Paris ring road in the south, the D20 from Gennevilliers in the west, the D27 from Bobigny in the east, and the D115 from Pantin in the south-east. The Paris ring road is just outside the southern border of the commune and there are two access routes to it: by the Porte d'Aubervilliers and by the Porte de la Villette. These roads provide easy access to the network of roads and motorways around Paris as well as Le Bourget and Charles de Gaulle airports.

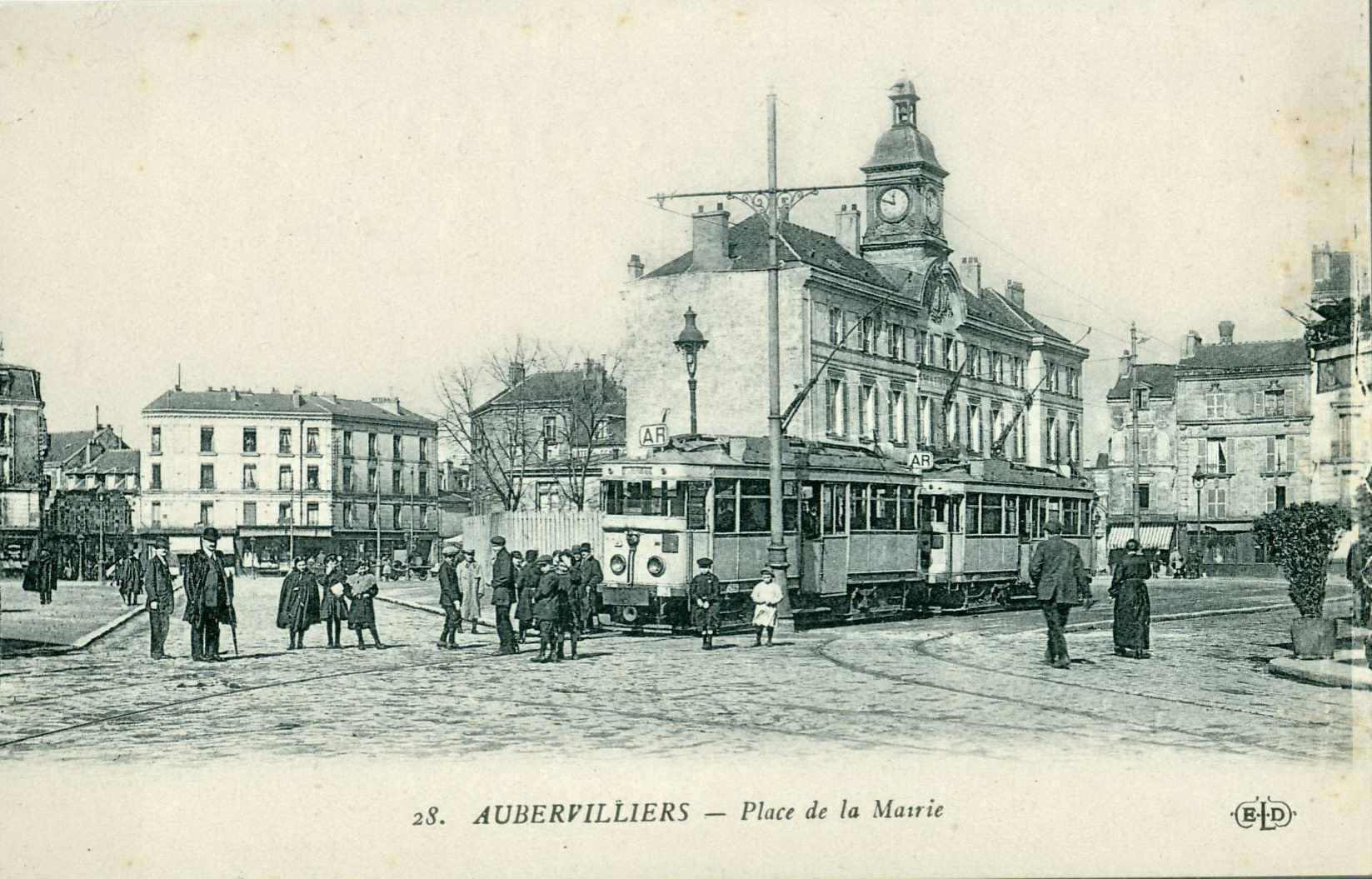
The square was once served by numerous tramways. The AR line (Aubervilliers - République), the Compagnie des tramways de Paris et du département de la Seine (TPDS) line and many others once terminated here.

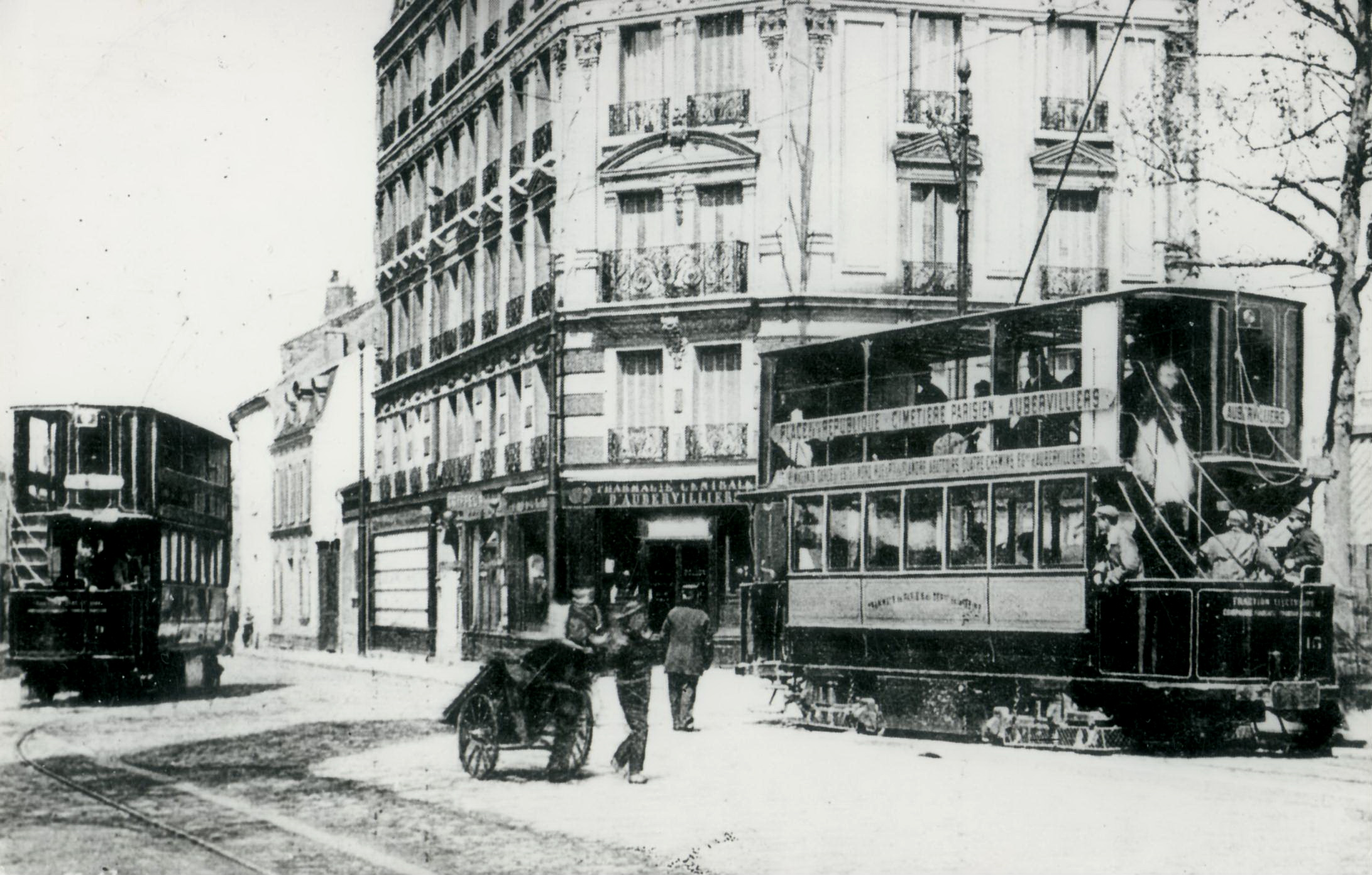
...as well as an electric Imperial tram from TPDS which circulated on the Place de la République - Gare de l'Est - Parisian cemetery - Quatre Chemins - Aubervilliers line.

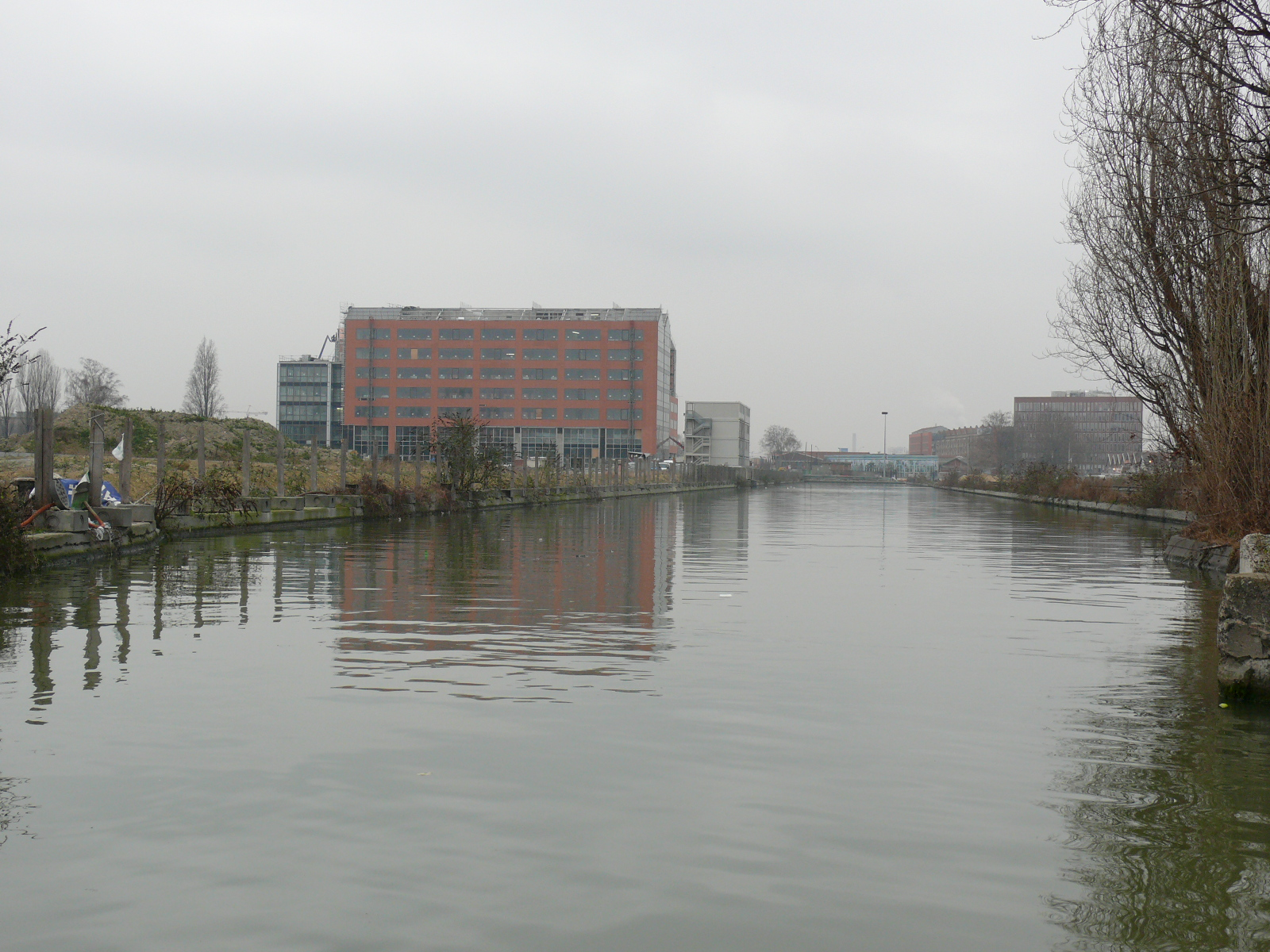
The Canal Saint-Denis at Aubervilliers

The Canal Saint-Denis once had important river ports and there was the Paris-Hirson railway and an industrial railway for Saint-Denis/Aubervilliers which served the Plaine Saint-Denis.

==== Public transport in the commune ====
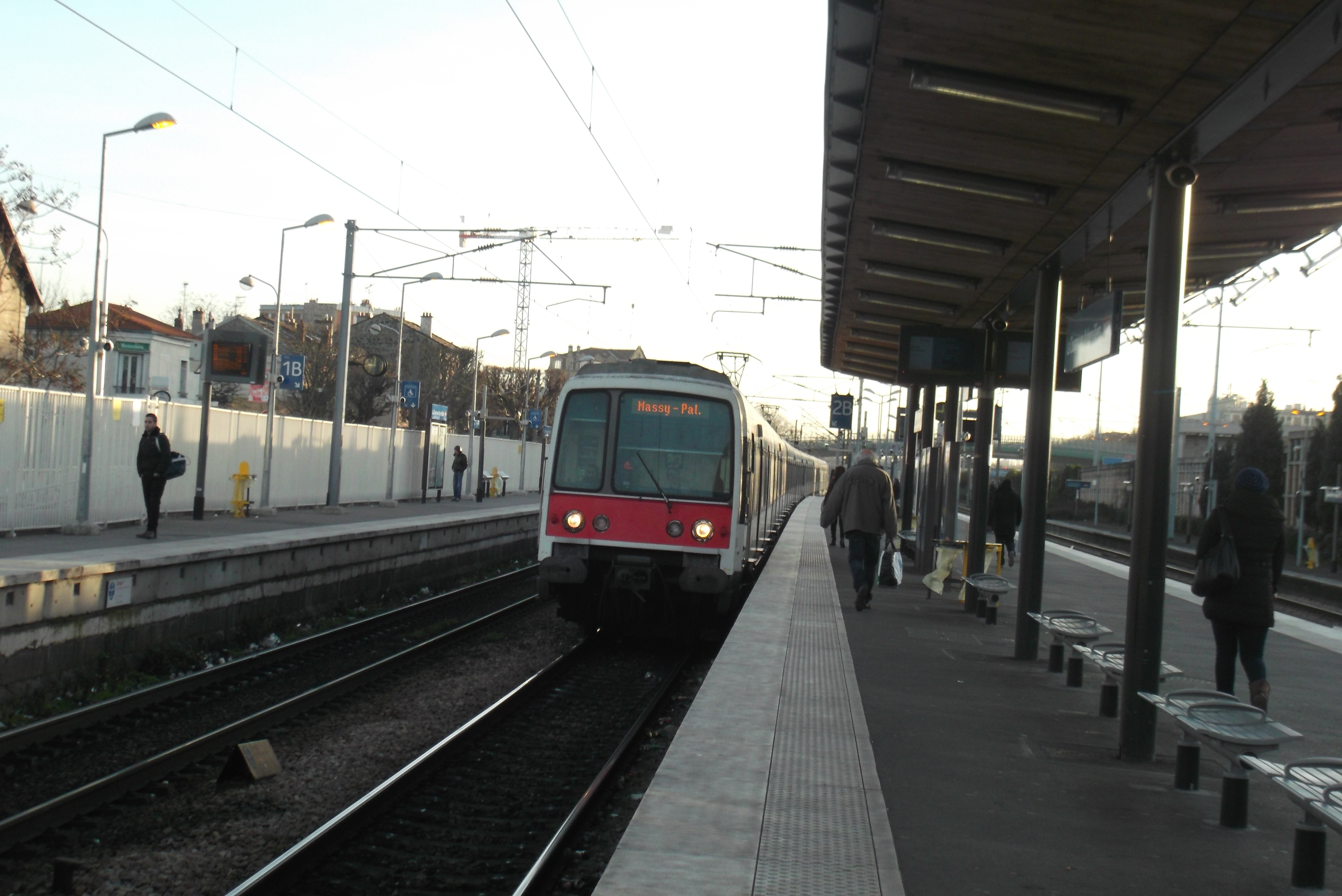
La Courneuve-Aubervilliers Station

The RER railway passes through the north of the commune and the station of La Courneuve-Aubervilliers, located just north of the commune on the N301 road, serves Aubervilliers. There are also two Metro stations on the south-western border on Avenue Jean-Jaures: Aubervilliers-Pantin-Quatre Chemins at the corner of Ave. de la Republique, and Fort d'Aubervilliers at the corner of Ave. de la Division Leclerc.

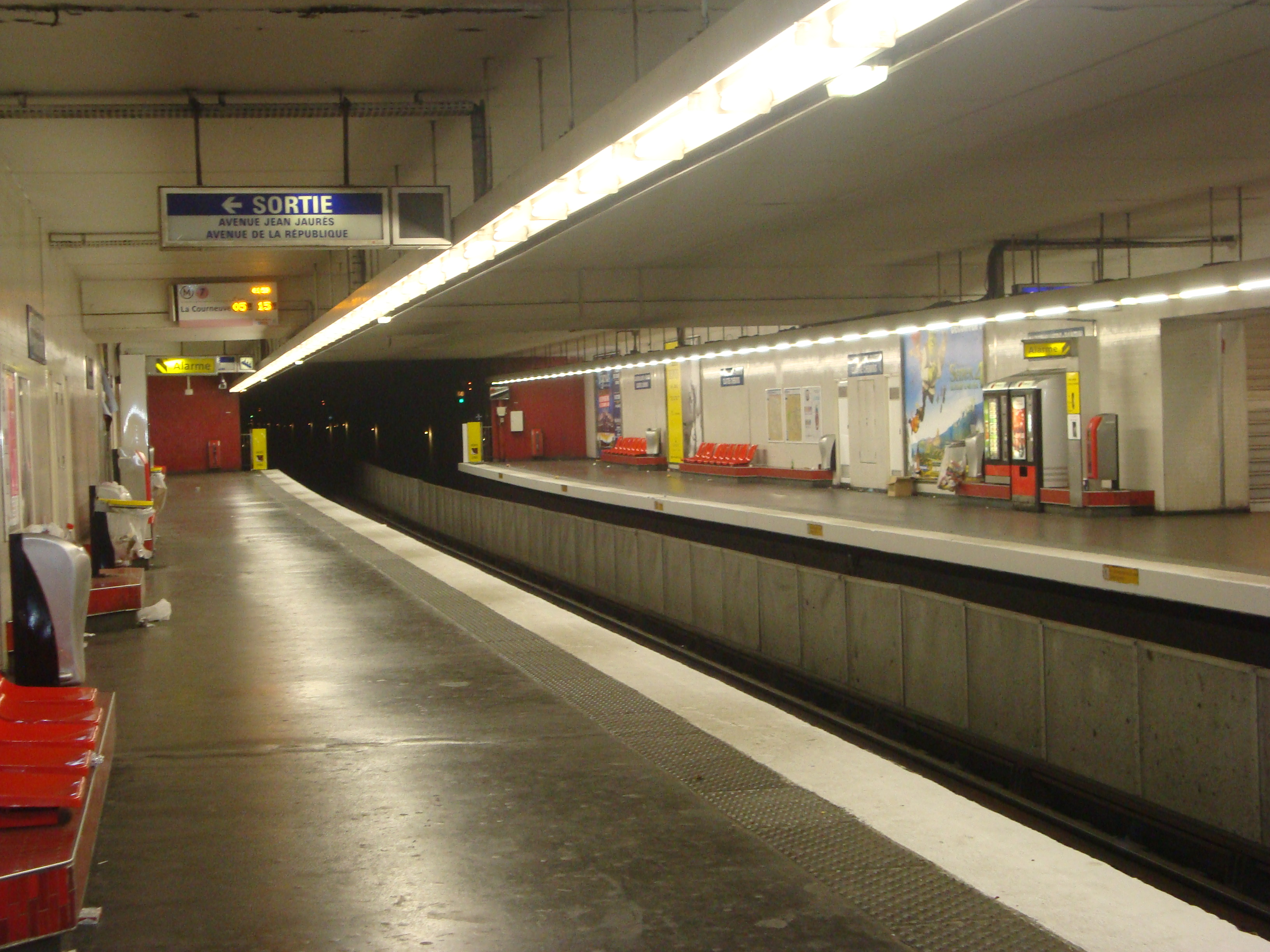
Aubervilliers-Pantin-Quatre Chemins on Metro Line 7

The commune is served by:

- Paris Métro Line 7: stations Aubervilliers-Pantin-Quatre Chemins and Fort d'Aubervilliers;
- Sixteen bus routes: RATP Bus: 35 134 139 150 152 170 173 234 239 249 250 302 330 512 Noctilien: N42 N43;
- Gare de La Plaine-Stade de France: as far as Saint-Denis and Aubervilliers;
- Gare de La Courneuve - Aubervilliers: located in La Courneuve commune about 1 km to the north of the commune border.
- Paris Métro Line 12 since 18 December 2012 with the opening of the Front Populaire station and ultimately, in May 2022, it got extended to Mairie d'Aubervilliers station, with 1 intermediate stop at Aimé Césaire station.
- Ligne 3b of the Île-de-France tramway since 15 December 2012 with the opening of the Porte d'Aubervilliers located in the Paris area near the commune.

== Urbanism ==
=== Typology ===
Aubervilliers is an urban commune, as it is one of the dense or intermediate density communes, as defined by the Insee communal density grid. (Note: According to the zoning of rural and urban municipalities published in November 2020, in application of the new definition of rurality validated on November 14, 2020 by the Interministerial Committee for Rural Areas.) It belongs to the urban unit of Paris, an inter-departmental conurbation comprising 407 communes and 10,785,092 inhabitants in 2017, of which it is a suburban commune.

The commune is also part of the functional area of Paris (Note: In October 2020, the concept of functional area replaced that of urban area in order to enable consistent comparisons with other European Union countries) where it is located in the main population and employment centre of the functional area. This area comprises 1,929 communes.

=== Urban morphology ===
The main quarters or districts of the commune are:

- Quatre-Chemins;
- Quarante-Cinq at La Villette;
- Maladrerie (and its 800 lodgings which form a Sensitive urban zone or ZFU);
- Pont-Blanc/Vallès/Hemet (the agglomération is called Vallès la Frette);
- Landy (split between Aubervilliers and Saint-Denis);
- Cité Crèvecœur (Crèvecœur Housing Estate);
- Cité du 112 (112 Housing Estate);
- Cité République (official name) (République Housing Estate);
- Sadi-Carnot;
- Les Presles;
- Cité Heurtault (Heurtault Housing Estate);
- Les Fleurs;
- Cité Gabriel-Péri (Gabriel-Péri Housing EState);
- Les Fusains;
- Square of roses;
- Le fort.
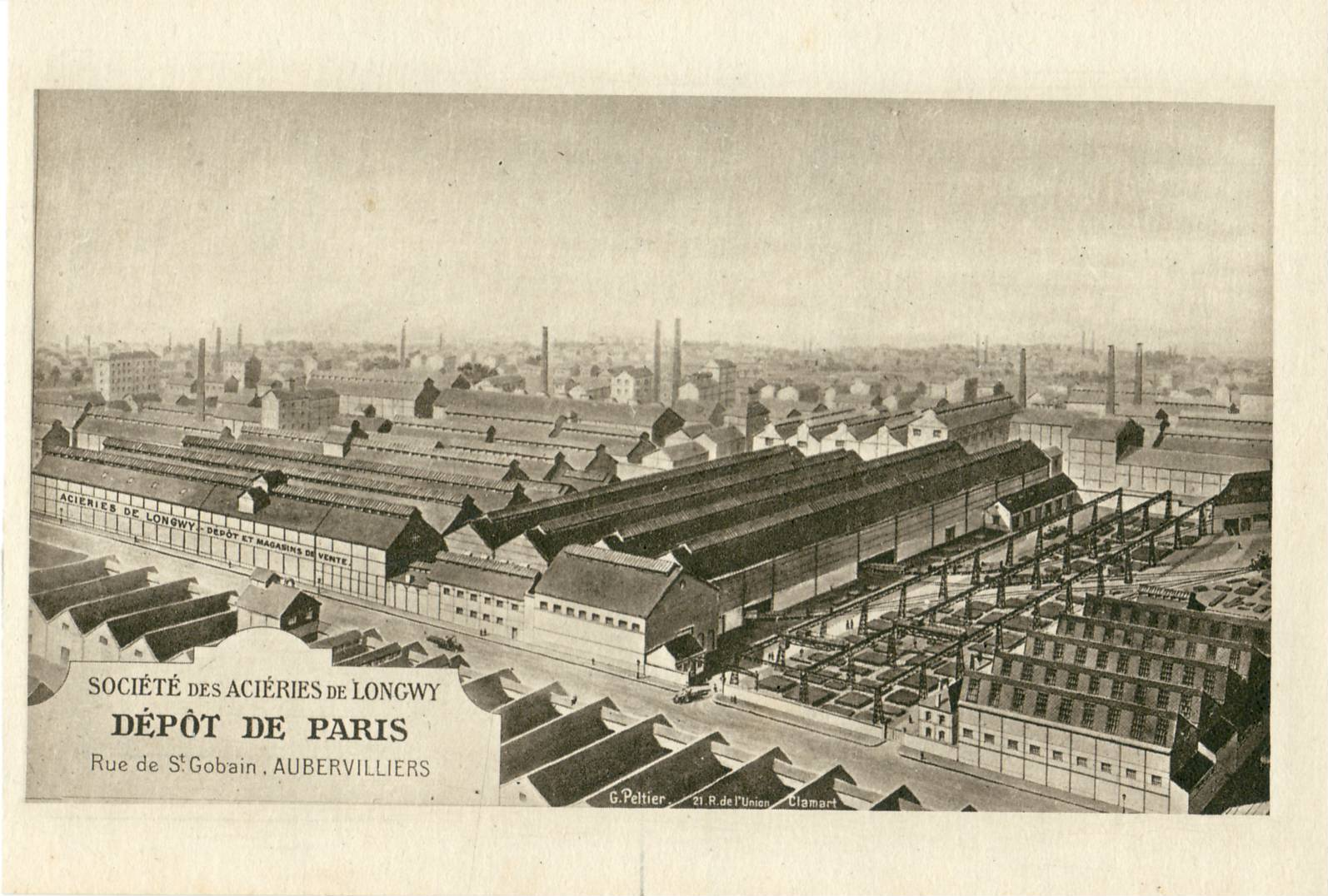
Longwy steelworks near the Canal Saint-Denis in the early 20th century.

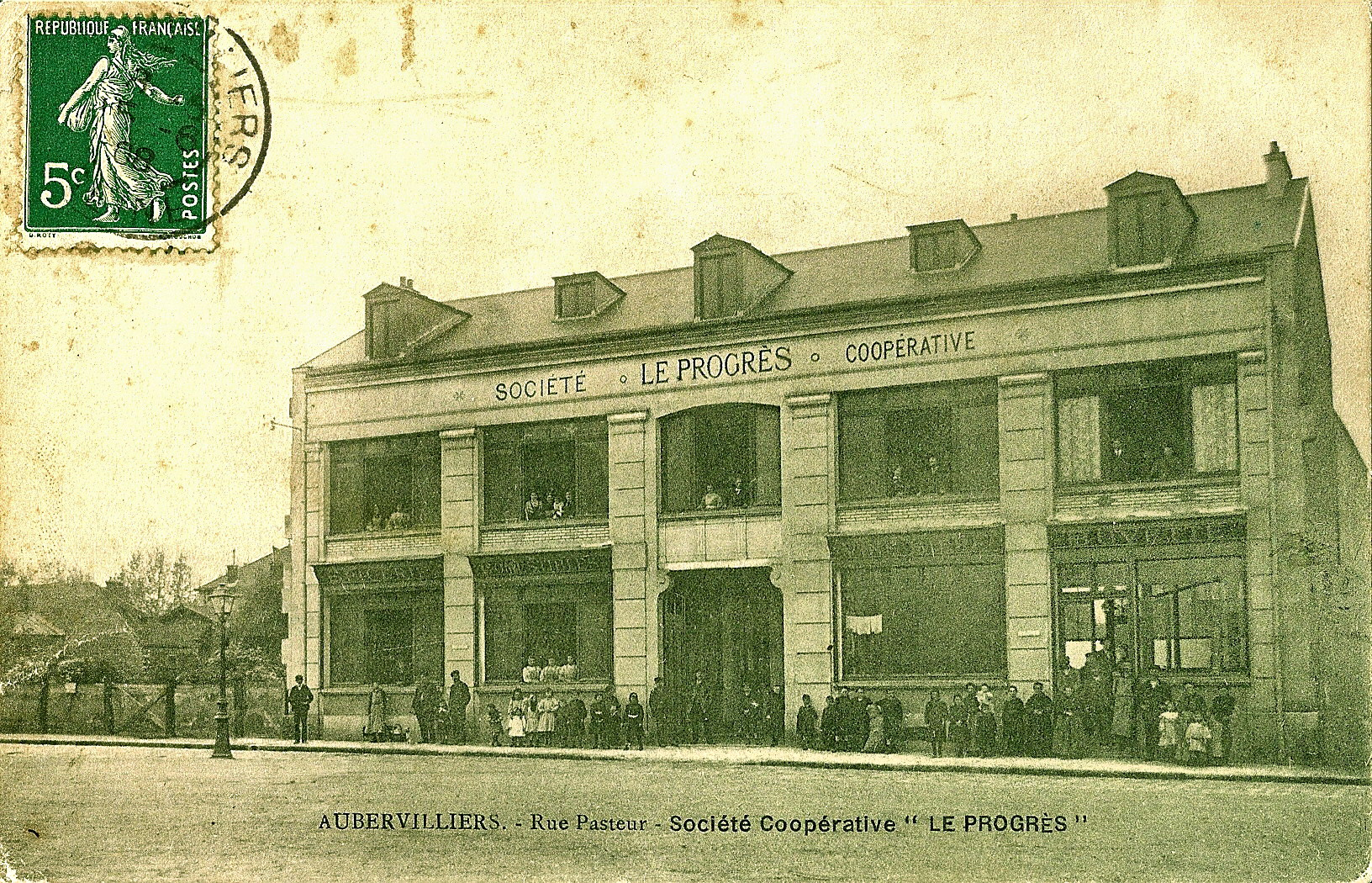
In the early 20th century industrial activity generated workers' organisations such as this co-operative store.

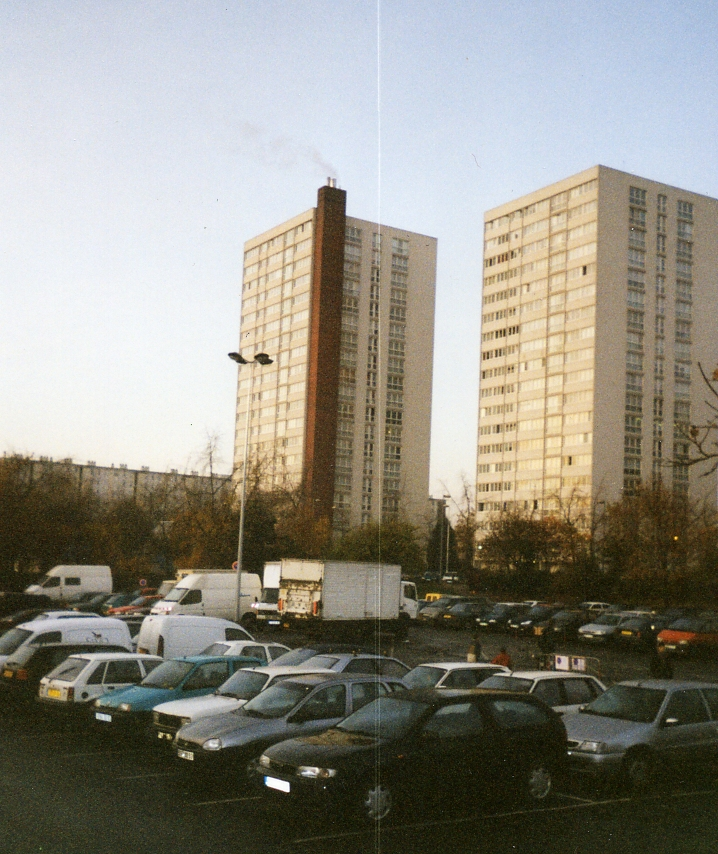
Housing Estate at Aubervilliers.

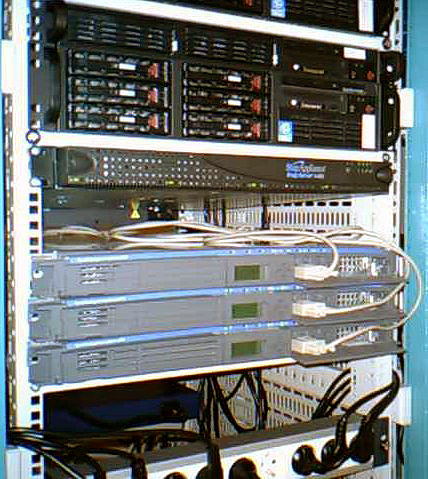
The Wikimedia Foundation Paris servers in the Telecity Centre in 2004.

== Toponymy ==
The town is mentioned in the Latinised form Albertivillare in 1059. It is from this that the inhabitants are known as Albertivillarien.

The place name of -villiers (a variant of -villier, -villers, -viller, coming from the Low Latin villare, derived from villa - progressively meaning "farm", "village", then "town") is a characteristic appellative for agricultural domains in the Merovingian and Carolingian periods. The first part is the Germanic personal name Adalbertus from which are derived the names Albert (English form) and Aubert (French form) and also became a surname. It is homonymous with a hamlet in Seine-et-Marne, Aubervilliers, and Auberville in Normandy (the others are explained by the Old Norse personal name Osbern giving Auber, the name of a Norman family).

== History ==
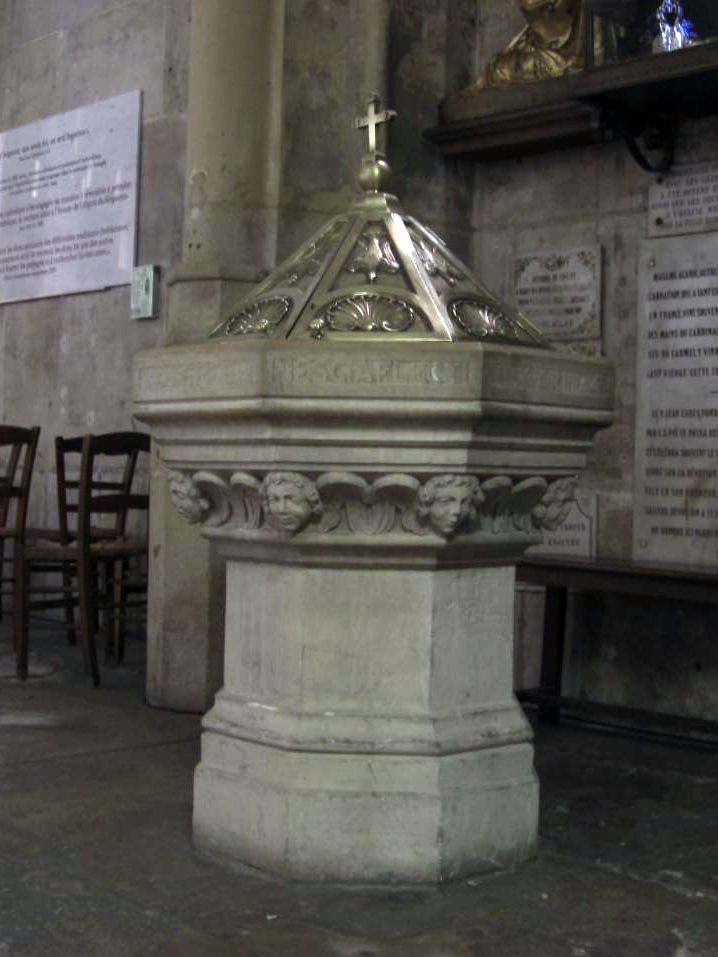
Baptismal fonts in the Church of Notre-Dame-des-Vertus.

=== Origins ===
As with many communes in the outer suburbs the town had long been a rural area. Formerly known as Notre-Dame-des-Vertus, the village was on a plain which produced the best vegetables around Paris.

=== Middle Ages ===
Aubervilliers first appears in the archives in 1059 as Albertivillare, meaning "estate of Adalbert". In the following year Henry I donated it to the Priory of Saint-Martin-des-Champs. In 1111 the serfs were freed in Aubervilliers. In 1182 the priory of Saint-Martin-des-Champs, located in Paris, granted Paris butchers the right to freely graze their cattle in the fields after the harvest was over. In 1221, Guillaume Bateste, lord of Franconville, became the first Lord of Vivier les Aubervilliers. The church, which at the beginning of the 13th century depended on one of the parishes of Saint Denis, soon became famous for the miraculous appearance of an image of the Virgin.

In 1336 Father Jacques Du Breul, Prior of the Abbey of Saint-Germain-des-Prés, reported the Miracle of the rain: A young girl busy preparing flowers to adorn the statue of the Virgin in the church saw her face streaming with tears when the rain began to fall on the parched crops. In 1338 King Philip VI of France and his queen went to Aubervilliers to visit the image. From 1340 to 1792 people went there in droves each year from Paris and its surroundings. In 1402 Michel de Laillier, Lord of Ermenonville, became Lord of Vivier les Aubervilliers. In 1429 the town was occupied by the English but was retaken by Michel de Laillier in 1436. Louis XI went there in November 1474 to the house of Pierre L’Orfèvre, the new Lord of Vivier from then until August 1478. The image of the Virgin in lead that the king wore on his hat was a representation of the one at Aubervilliers.

In 1531 the Lordship of Vivier les Aubervilliers was sold to the Montholon family which held it until 1779. The facade and tower of the church were built in the reign of Henry II. Civil wars which the Armagnacs stirred up in France led to the destruction of the village but the abundant alms of the many pilgrims who came from all sides allowed a prompt reconstruction. On 10 November 1567 the Battle of Saint-Denis took place in the Plaine Saint-Denis between the Catholic army of Anne de Montmorency and the Protestant troops of the Prince of Condé.

Henri IV stayed in Aubervilliers during the Siege of Paris in 1590.

=== From the Renaissance to the 18th century ===
The visit by Louis XIII in 1613, then again in 1614 and 1628, allowed the development of pilgrimage to Notre-Dame des Virtues. Jacques Gallemant, pastor of Aubervilliers, allowed a community of Oratorians to settle in Aubervilliers in 1618. They took charge of the Church of Notre-Dame-des-Vertus and developed an important pilgrimage around the statue of the Virgin of Aubervilliers. The installation from 1622 of a "House of Notre-Dame des Vertus" by the Oratorians of John de Bérulle then its progressive extension throughout the 17th century made Aubervilliers an important centre of French Catholic spirituality. Thinkers, "pious and famous faithful" such as Francis de Sales, Vincent de Paul, John Eudes (he stayed for two years), Jean-Jacques Ollier, Jean-Baptiste de La Salle, the philosopher Nicolas Malebranche, and the son of the great Jean Racine - the poet Louis Racine participated in a pilgrimage there and returned. At the end of the 17th century and in the first half of the 18th century, the House of Oratorians of Aubervilliers became a "stronghold" of the Jansenist dissent.

In 1649, during the Fronde, Aubervilliers fell into misery. Crops were destroyed, death reigned and population declined. There were 125 deaths in 1652 in a population of about 1,500 inhabitants. Nevertheless, the small town was reborn although until the 19th century it was populated by farmers. Proximity to the Paris markets promoted Market gardening, especially on the Plain of Vertus which was famous for its onions and a wide range of vegetables. The existence of the Mazier farm at 70 Rue Heurtault is attested by a document in 1699.

=== French Revolution and Empire ===
On 12 August 1787 the first meeting of the Municipal Assembly of Aubervilliers took place. In 1789 there was a list of grievances, complaints and remonstrances written by Mesme Monard, the parish priest, and one of the leaders against the Oratorians. On 24 January 1790 the election of the first mayor of Aubervilliers took place: Nicolas Lemoine was elected. In 1792 the boundary of the commune of Aubervilliers was delineated.

During the Napoleonic Wars, the Plain of Aubervilliers was, in 1814 and 1815, the scene of a bloody battle between French troops and the Prussians who took and re-took it several times. The French soldiers were overpowered by numbers and were eventually forced to abandon it.

=== From the Restoration to the Paris Commune ===
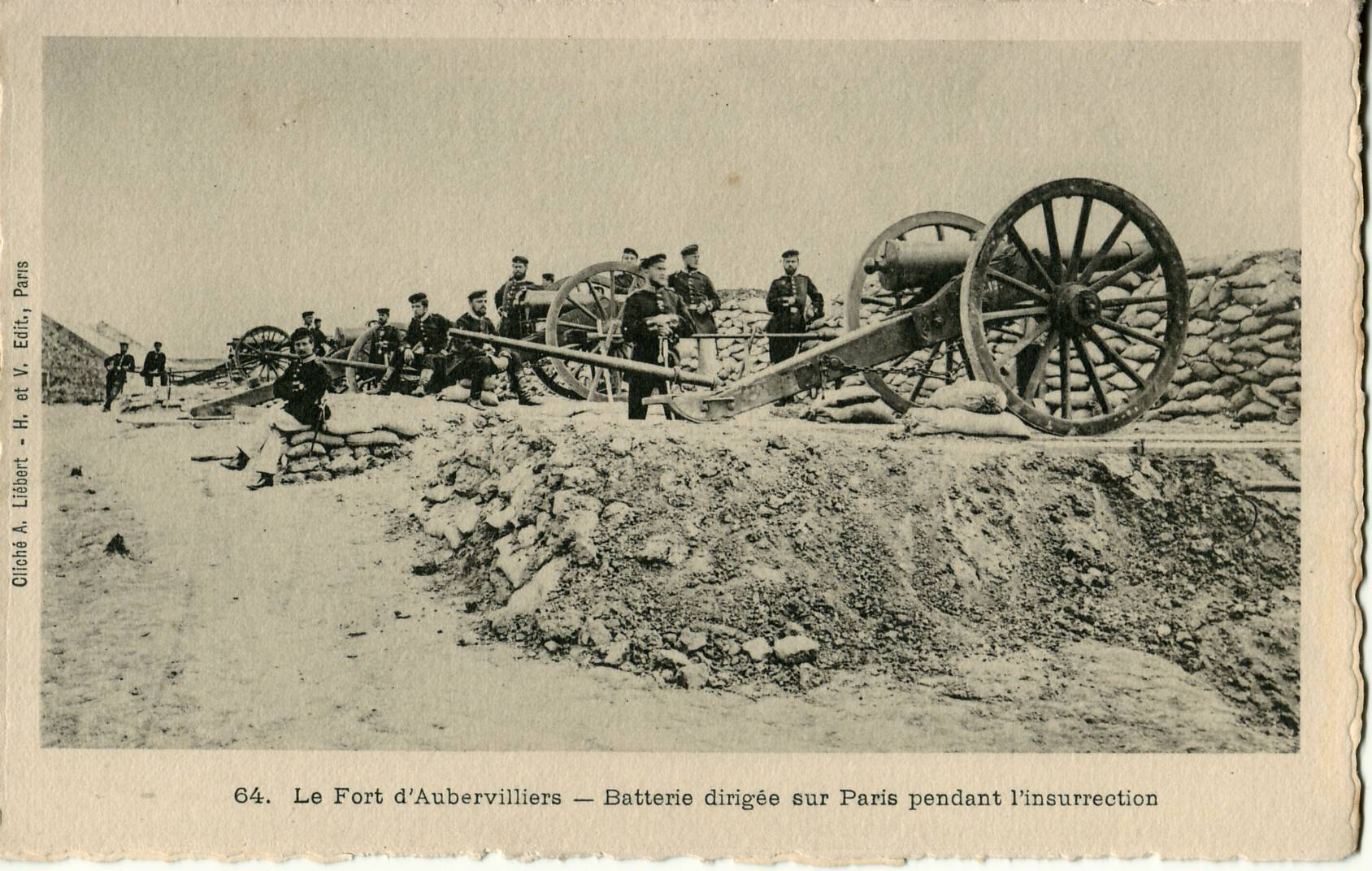
Prussian battery aimed at Paris during the insurrection of the Paris Commune at the Fort d’Aubervilliers. Liébert fired.

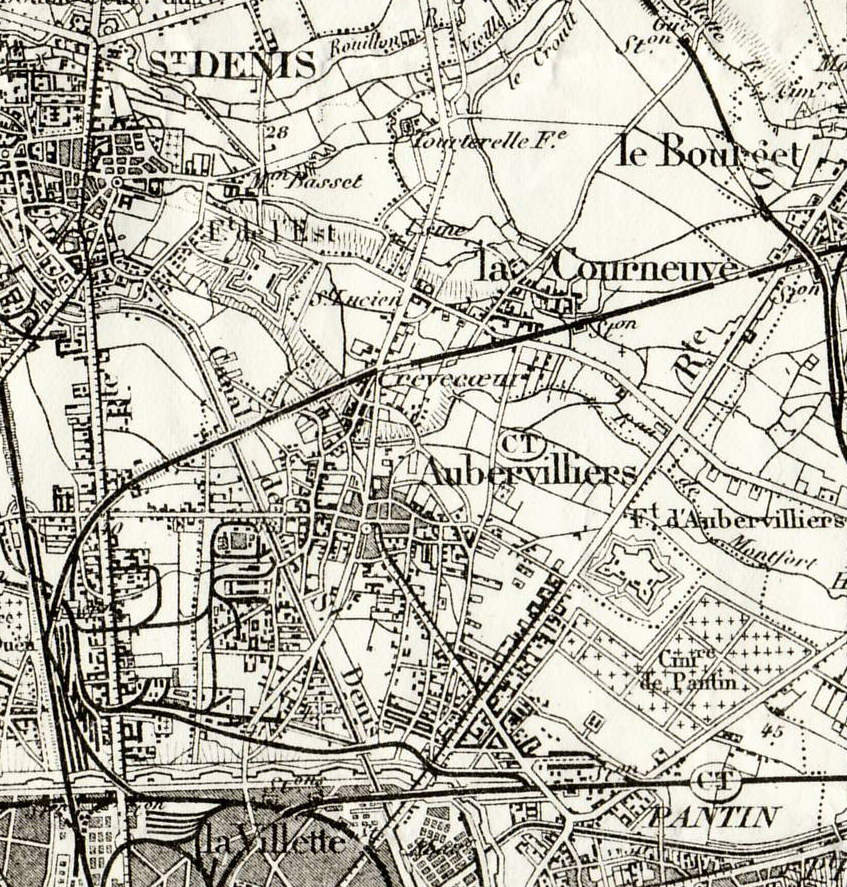
Aubervilliers in 1888. Map by the état-major.

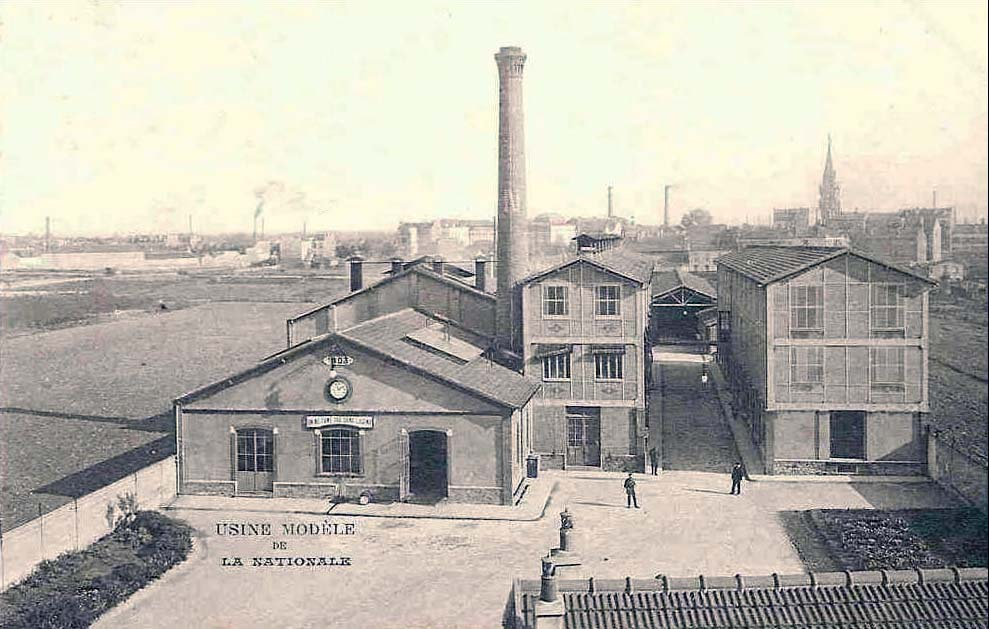
The Nationale factory at the beginning of the 20th century

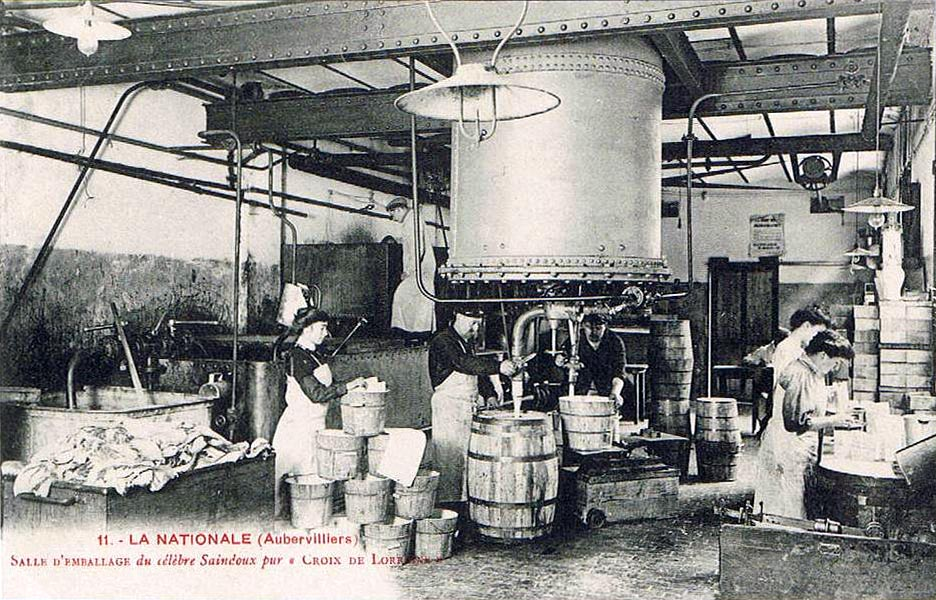
Interior of the Nationale factory

On 13 May 1821 the Canal Saint-Denis opened. In 1832, an outbreak of cholera decimated the population. In 1840 a factory was set up to manufacture soap from resin. The Fort d'Aubervilliers was built in 1843 - it was part of the Thiers wall, a structure authorised in 1840 by Adolphe Thiers to protect Paris and, where appropriate, to subdue its rebellions forming an elongated belt around Paris. It was used for the repression of the Paris Commune. The grounds of the fort and its surroundings are part of Aubervilliers commune. In 1861 the Central Market was created.

On 1 January 1860, the city of Paris was enlarged by annexing neighbouring communes. On that occasion, a small part of the commune of Aubervilliers was annexed to the city of Paris. At the same time, the commune of La Chapelle-Saint-Denis was disbanded and divided between the city of Paris, Aubervilliers, Saint-Denis, and Saint-Ouen. Aubervilliers received a small part of the territory of La Chapelle-Saint-Denis.

The Industrial Revolution and the expansion of Paris radically changed the situation in Aubervilliers. Industries were established next to the canal. On 6 October 1862 Baron Hainguerlot began the operation of General Stores in Saint-Denis. In 1866 he moved to Aubervilliers. In 1866 Saint-Gobain purchased a factory manufacturing sulphuric acid from John Frédéric Boyd which was located on Rue du Landy. On 12 September 1867 Lady Lequin began operating a Match factory at a place called La Motte, Rue du Vivier.

During the Siege of Paris in 1870 the municipal government took refuge in Paris at 20 Boulevard de Strasbourg. At the beginning of 1877 a tramway arrived in the city centre. In 1879, the boyauderie (Tripe factory) owned by Mr. Jacquart was established. It was later purchased by Witt SA, a boyaudier from La Courneuve. The whole complex was bought in 1921 by the Wanner establishment who manufactured insulating materials: ceramic, plaster, and cork tiles. On 18 June 1897 a grease manufacturing factory (industrial oils and greases) was established on Chemin Haut de St Denis at Aubervilliers and remained in operation until the Second World War. In 1898 a tram depot was built at the corner of the Avenue de la République No. 30 and Rue du Midi.

=== The Belle Époque to the Second World War ===
At the end of the 19th century the life of the small town was already closely linked to nascent industrialization. People from Belgium, Lorraine, Alsace, Brittany, Spain, and Italy arrived in successive waves. This capacity to absorb and mix populations is characteristic of the history of the commune. Workers come to live in the suburbs which were cheaper than in Paris. Ever since Aubervilliers has been a multicultural city where more than 70 nationalities live.

For decades major industries shaped the identity of the city.

The district of Quatre-Chemins, which straddles the boundary of Aubervilliers and Pantin, was pejoratively nicknamed La Petite Prusse (Little Prussia) due to many immigrants coming to work in the Saint-Gobain glassworks - established in 1866 next to the canal. The identity of the district led them to ask in vain for the status of full-function commune at the end of the 19th century.

Summary of events

- 15–16 April 1900: the burning of the church.
- 1908: installation of the Edmond Jean Enamel works.
- 1923: Pierre Laval became mayor of Aubervilliers, up until 1944.
- 1927: Construction of the main post office on Rue Achille-Domart.
- 1929: Construction of 186 cheap housing units and 4 shops by the Société Anonyme d'HBM d'Aubervilliers on avenue Jean-Jaurès, opposite the Fort.
- 1931: Construction of 110 cheap housing units and 4 shops by l’Office public d’HBM d’Aubervilliers, Rue de la Goutte d'Or and Rue Bordier. Work on the Auguste Delaune Municipal Stadium ends.
- 1944: the Leclerc division is stationed on Route nationale 2. Charles Tillon becomes mayor.

=== Contemporary period ===
Tour Villette

- 1948: Construction of 142 housing units at Pont Blanc.
- 1953: Mayor Charles Tillon resigns, Émile Dubois replaces him; 19 April: construction by the HLM Group of Prés Clos; 14 July: delivery of the Ethel and Julius Rosenberg Estate on Avenue du President Roosevelt.
- 18 July 1954: construction of 37 housing units at 37 Rue des Grandes-Walls.
- 1957: following the death of Mayor Émile Dubois, André Karman becomes mayor.
- 1958: Construction of the Gabriel-Peri Estate.
- 15 May 1965: delivery of the Maurice Thorez Estate at 21 rue des Cités.
- 1969: construction of the République Estate located at 64-68 Avenue de la République.
- On the night of 1 and 2 January 1970 five Africans were found dead in a migrant workers residence from asphyxia due to an improvised heating system. This drama has a strong impact and gave rise to a lively debate on immigration and living conditions in the migrant workers' residences. Despite a call for privacy at the funeral on 10 January, there was an eruption of demonstrators by the Gauche prolétarienne (Proletarian Left) and people such as Kateb Yacine, Jean-Paul Sartre, and Michel Rocard. The Aubervilliers slum was visited two days later by Prime Minister Jacques Chaban-Delmas, followed by a controversial televised debate on 14 January on Les Dossiers de l'écran. This drama made a lasting impression on the representation of immigration in the French collective imagination.
- 1972:, the Aubervilliers Slum on the Chemin de Halage along the canal near Stains bridge completely disappeared.
- 1974: The Tour La Villette is an example of contemporary architecture.
- 1978: Renovation of the Maladrerie district.
- 1979: Inauguration of the Paris Métro stations of Aubervilliers-Pantin-Quatre Chemins and Fort d'Aubervilliers.
- 1984: On the death of Mayor André Karman Jack Ralite becomes mayor.

The construction of the Stade de France (Stadium of France) just north of the commune in 1998 was a stimulating element in the Saint-Denis Plain. With its 750 hectares on the outskirts of Paris, The Saint-Denis Plain covers one third of Aubervilliers and extends over Saint-Denis and Saint-Ouen. Since the early 2000s this area, which was one of the largest industrial areas in Europe, has been changing. It received the Condorcet Campus in 2019.

In 2014, the commune has been awarded "two flowers" by the National Council of Towns and Villages in Bloom in the Competition of cities and villages in Bloom.

The Franco-Chinese Friendship Association stated that from November 2015 to August 2016 over 100 ethnic Chinese in Aubervilliers had been robbed. 49-year old Chaoling Zhang (张朝林 Zhāng Cháolín), beaten in a robbery, died on August 16, 2016.

=== Heraldry ===
Arms of Aubervilliers	The arms of Aubervilliers are blazoned: Parti per pale, at 1 Gules, 3 bezants of Or in pale; at 2 Argent, an arrow sable in pale. In 1790 the municipal assembly of Aubervilliers had an oval seal engraved (kept in the National Archives), representing, together with the arms of France, a sun and a lion passant. While this was retained by the Commission d’héraldique urbaine de la Seine and proposed in 1942 as symbol of the commune, the municipality preferred the above arms, evoking la Compagnie des Chevaliers de l’Arc, which it had used since the end of the 19th century.

== Politics and administration ==
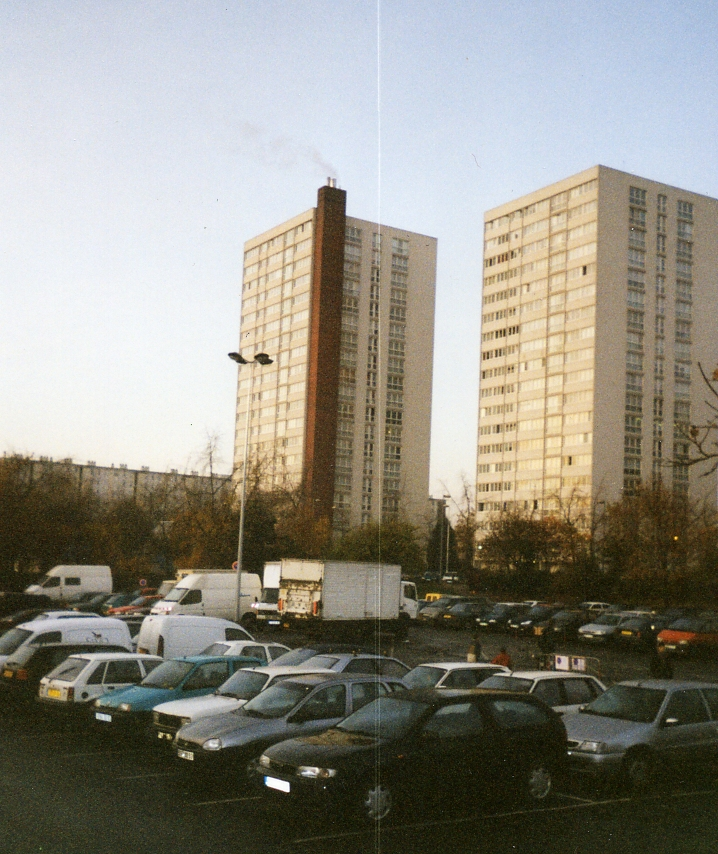
Aubervilliers

Until the law of 10 July 1964 the commune was part of the department of Seine. The redistribution of the former departments of Seine and Seine-et-Oise resulted in the commune becoming part of Seine-Saint-Denis after the administrative transfer effective from 1 January 1968.

Aubervilliers is the only commune of the canton of Aubervilliers, created in 2015. It is one of the 9 communes of the arrondissement of Saint-Denis.

=== Political trends and results ===
In the 2008 municipal elections, the PS came first in the first round of 9 March 2008 but lost against the list headed by the PCF. Despite the national agreements to desist in favour of the leftist list in the best position, the PS list led by Jacques Salvator was maintained in the second round and won the election with 41.48% of the vote against the list of the incumbent mayor, Pascal Beaudet (PCF), the UMP, and the MoDem.

In March 2011 in the cantonal elections (Canton of Aubervilliers-Est) Pascal Beaudet (PCF, PG, GU, ZIP, Federated) again led the first round (30.9%) in the context of a record abstention rate (72.3%). The Socialist candidate continued again in the second round, as in 2008 but this time Pascal Beaudet won the election in the second round (50.76%). The two cantons of Aubervilliers are now run by the communists (Jean-Jacques Karman and Pascal Beaudet).

=== Mayors ===
List of Successive Mayors

Mayors from the French Revolution to 1942

From	To	Name	Party	Position
1790	1791	Nicolas Lemoine		
1791	1793	Jean-Louis Hemet		
1793	1795	Jean-Joseph Delehet		
1795	1795	Nicolas Poisson		
1795	1799	Jean-Louis Hemet		
1799	1800	Louis Demars		
1800	1815	Denis-Nicolas Demars		
1815	1816	Denis-Hubert de Francottay		
1816	1826	Pierre-Nicolas Godieu		
1826	1830	Auguste Loyer		
1830	1848	Jean Lemoine		
1848	1848	Félix Reuillet		
1848	1860	Georges-Etienne Demars		
1860	1865	Son Dumarais		
1865	1870	Joigneaux		
1870	1871	Isidore Porce		
1871	1878	Toussaint Bordier		
1878	1881	Jean-Jules Schaeffer		
1881	1884	Jean-François Crozier		
1884	1904	Achille Domart		
1904	1908	Louis-Auguste Fourrier		
1908	1919	Christophe Poisson		
1919	1923	Michel Georgen		
1923	1940	Louis-Auguste Fourrier		
1923	1942	Pierre Laval		

Mayors from 1942

From	To	Name	Party	Position
1942	1944	Pages		
1944	1945	Armand Lavie		
1944	1953	Charles Tillon	PCF	Fitter, Member of the resistance
1953	1957	Emile Dubois	PCF	
1957	1984	André Karman	PCF	Milling machine operator
1984	2003	Jack Ralite	PCF	Journalist
2003	2008	Pascal Beaudet	PCF	Teacher
2008	2014	Jacques Salvator	PS	Administrative executive
2014	2016	Pascal Beaudet	PCF	Teacher
2016	2020	Meriem Derkaoui	PCF	Local administrative executive
2020	2026	Karine Franclet	UDI	
2026	2032	Sofienne Karroumi		

=== Twinning ===
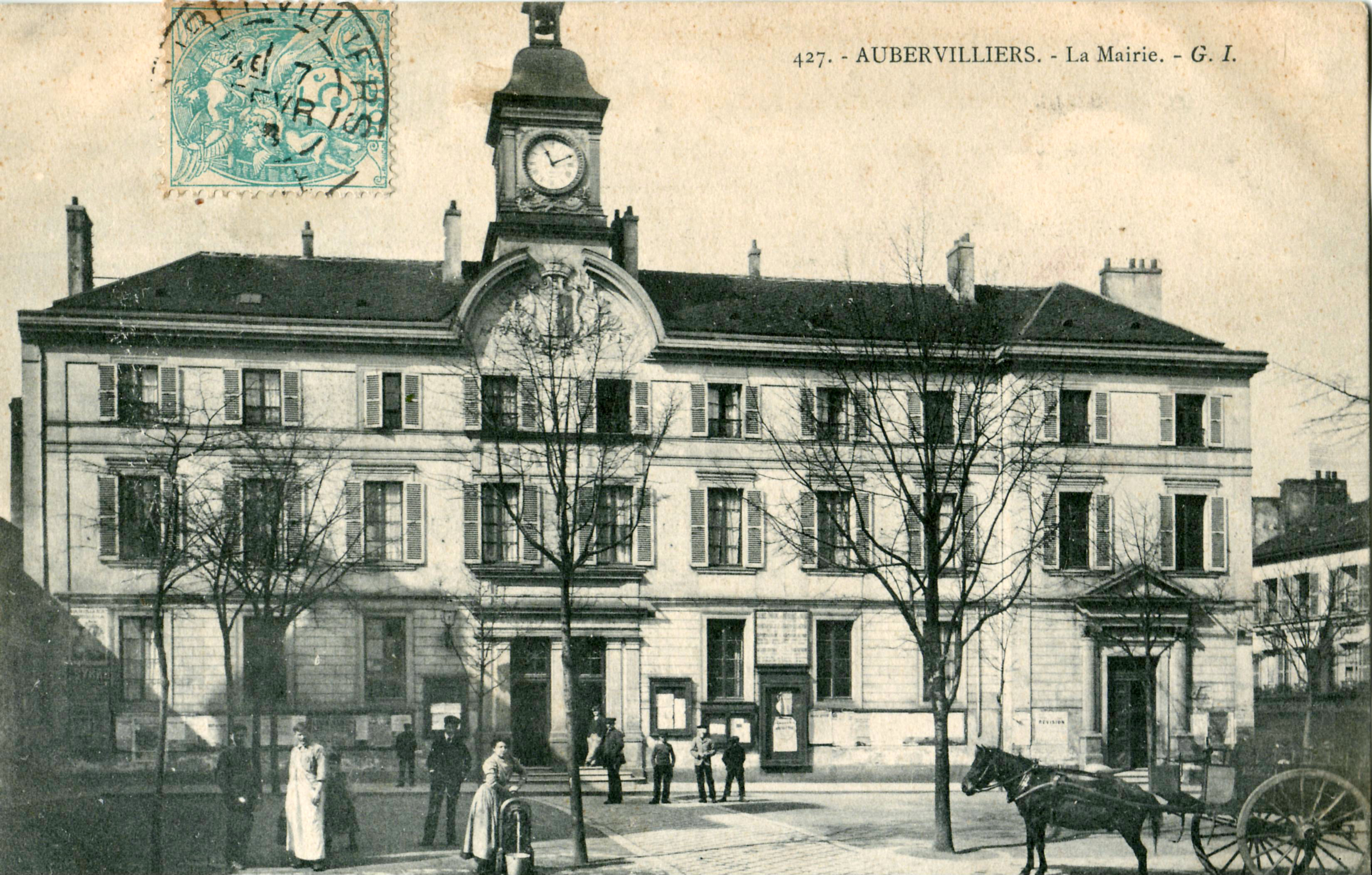
The Hôtel de Ville (town hall) in 1908

Aubervilliers has twinning associations with:

- Beit Jala, Palestine (since 1997)
- Bouly, Mauritania (since 1994)
- Jena, Germany (since 1999)

== Population and society ==
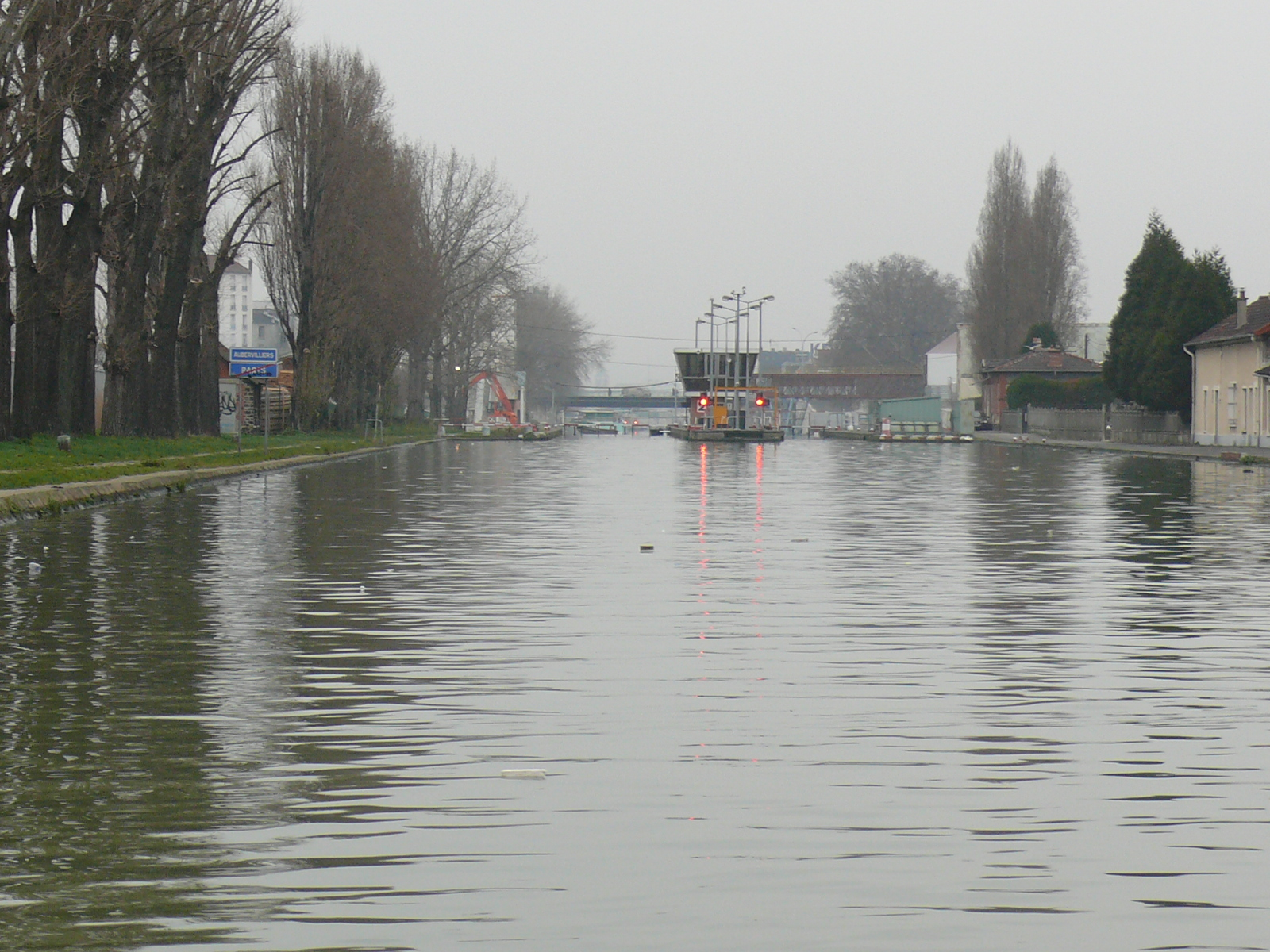
Canal Saint-Denis near Lock 2

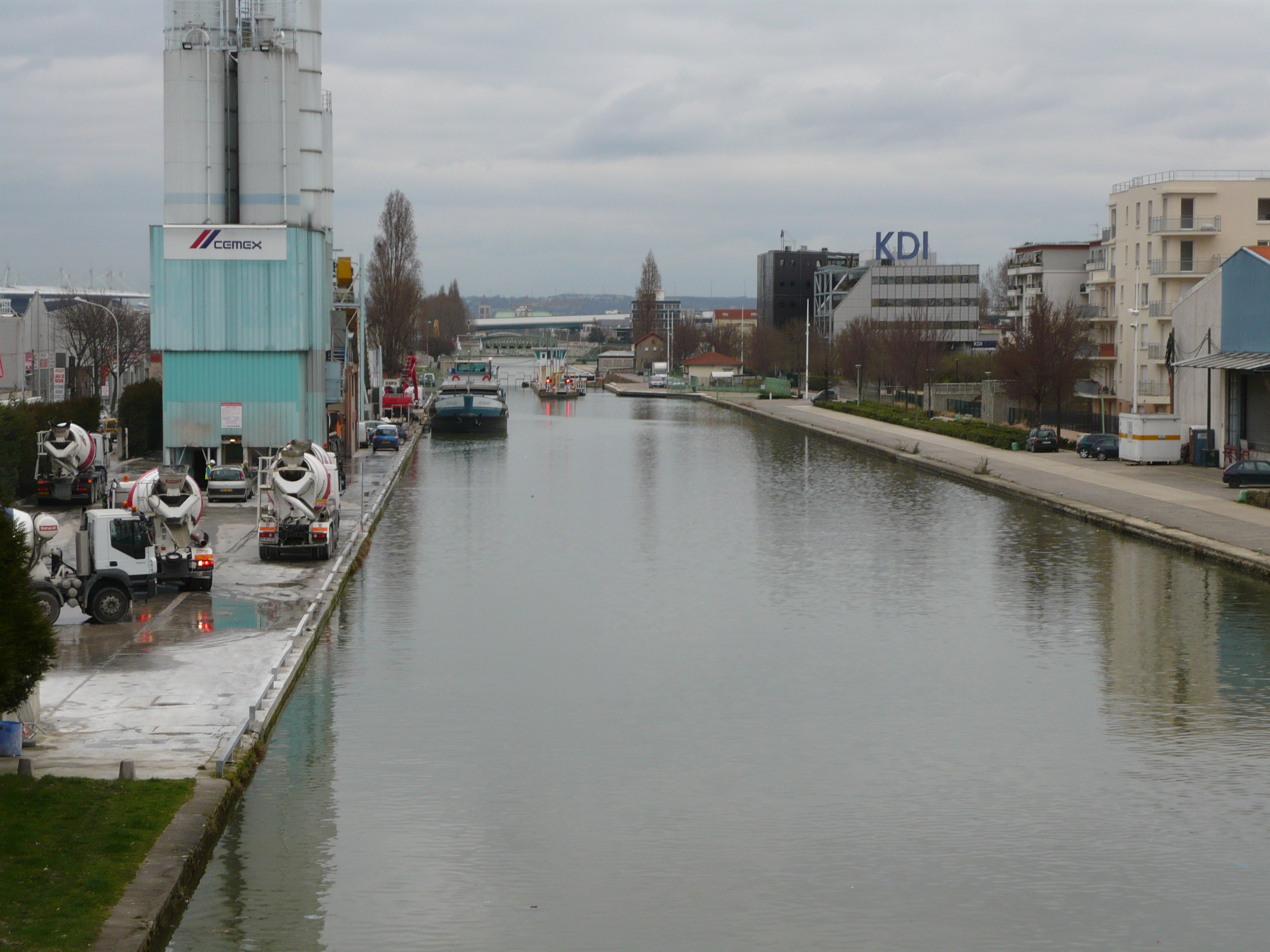
The Canal Saint-Denis

=== Immigration ===
Place of birth of residents of Aubervilliers in 1999
Born in metropolitan France	Born outside metropolitan France			
63.2%	36.8%			
63.2%	Born in overseas France	Born in foreign countries with French citizenship at birth^{1}	EU-15 immigrants^{2}	Non-EU-15 immigrants
63.2%	2.8%	2.3%	5.8%	25.9%
^{1} This group is made up largely of former French settlers, such as pieds-noirs in Northwest Africa, followed by former colonial citizens who had French citizenship at birth (such as was often the case for the native elite in French colonies), as well as to a lesser extent foreign-born children of French expatriates. A foreign country is understood as a country not part of France in 1999, so a person born for example in 1950 in Algeria, when Algeria was an integral part of France, is nonetheless listed as a person born in a foreign country in French statistics.^{2} An immigrant is a person born in a foreign country not having French citizenship at birth. An immigrant may have acquired French citizenship since moving to France, but is still considered an immigrant in French statistics. On the other hand, persons born in France with foreign citizenship (the children of immigrants) are not listed as immigrants.

Ethnic Chinese from Wenzhou began arriving in Aubervilliers in the 1980s and 1990s to participate in the textile industry. In 2016 protests staged by ethnic Chinese occurred after several Chinese in Aubervilliers were attacked, including one murder of a local Chinese man by delinquent youths. As of 2016 4,000 ethnic Chinese live in Aubervilliers.

=== Demography ===
The inhabitants of the commune are known as Albertivillariens or Albertivillariennes in French.

Historical population

Year	Pop.	±% p.a.
1793	1,900	—
1800	1,884	−0.12%
1806	1,946	+0.54%
1821	1,952	+0.02%
1831	2,213	+1.26%
1836	2,292	+0.70%
1841	2,551	+2.16%
1846	2,853	+2.26%
1851	2,611	−1.76%
1856	3,204	+4.18%
1861	6,098	+13.74%
1866	9,240	+8.67%
1872	12,195	+4.73%
1876	14,340	+4.13%
1881	19,437	+6.27%
1886	22,223	+2.72%
1891	25,022	+2.40%
1896	27,332	+1.78%
1901	31,215	+2.69%

Year	Pop.	±% p.a.
1906	34,009	+1.73%
1911	37,558	+2.01%
1921	40,832	+0.84%
1926	48,053	+3.31%
1931	55,714	+3.00%
1936	55,871	+0.06%
1946	53,010	−0.52%
1954	58,740	+1.29%
1962	70,632	+2.33%
1968	73,695	+0.71%
1975	72,976	−0.14%
1982	67,719	−1.06%
1990	67,557	−0.03%
1999	63,136	−0.75%
2007	73,699	+1.95%
2012	77,032	+0.89%
2017	86,375	+2.32%
2023	88,365	+0.38%

Source: EHESS and INSEE

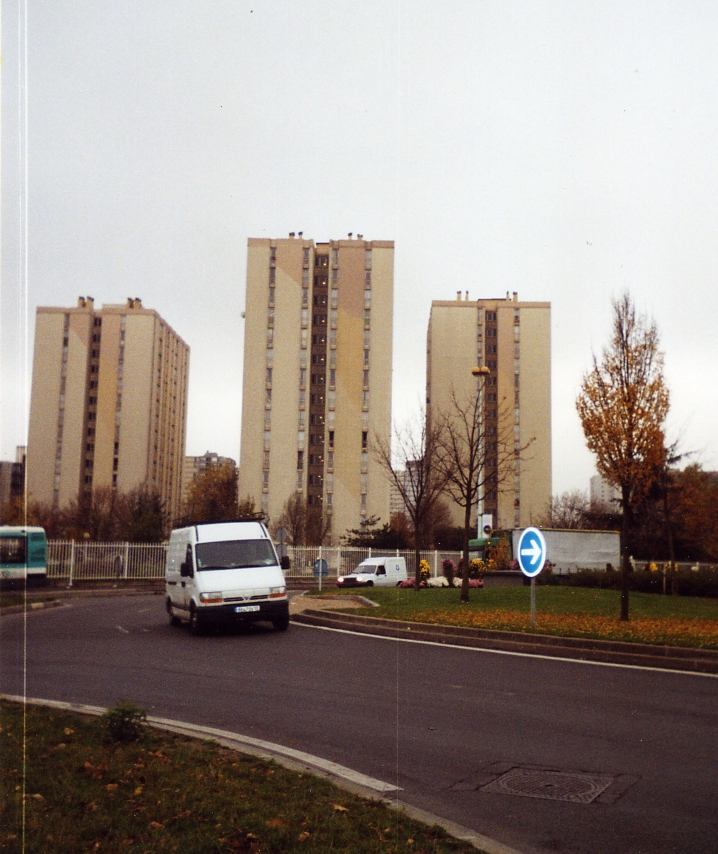
Housing Estate

After a period of decline between 1968 and 1999, Aubervilliers has seen a population increase of 40% between 1999 and 2023. The number of dwellings have increased by 4,662 from 2007 to 2017 or 15.6%, and the number of vacant units has increased from 1,713 in 2007 to 1,997 in 2017.

Between 1982 and 1999 43,000 people reported that they would come to live in Aubervilliers (68.1% of the population in 1999) and, as the population decreased by 4,589 during the period, it can be concluded that nearly 48,000 people left Aubervilliers. We can deduce from these figures that only a third of the population is stable.

The decade 2000–2010 saw a marked relaunching of demographics in the wake of the economic revival of the Plaine-Saint-Denis. The migration in the commune became positive (+0.4% per year from 1999 to 2010) and was combined with a natural balance growth (+1.75% per year). The increase is particularly noticeable in the western canton of la Villette in Landy. This strong recovery makes it necessary for the joint construction of a school (kindergarten and primary) from 2010 to 2014.

In 2010 there were 31,379 immigrants in Aubervilliers (or 41.2% of the population of the commune - the highest proportion in the department), including 3,919 from the European Union, 1,418 from the rest of Europe, 11,313 from the Maghreb, and 6,810 from the rest of Africa According to demographer Michèle Tribalat, in 2005 about three-quarters of young people under 18 years old in the commune are foreign or French of foreign origin, mainly from the Maghreb and sub-Saharan Africa.

=== Distribution of age groups ===
Population by age of Aubervilliers, 2023 (%)

80+	2.3
65–79	8.7
55–64	9.7
40–54	20.8
25–39	24.7
15–24	14.2
0–14	19.5

Total: 99.9

male

female

Source: INSEE

Population by age of Seine-Saint-Denis, 2023 (%)

90+	3.1
75–89	9.4
60–74	10.6
45–59	19.8
30–44	22.2
15–29	13.6
0–14	21.3

Total: 100

male

female

Source: INSEE

== Economy ==
In economic terms Aubervilliers is the fourth largest city in the department of Seine-Saint-Denis with 30,000 jobs and 2,444 businesses in the private sector.

The city has a dense network of SMEs representing 25% of employment. These SMEs include research laboratories such as Rhodia (730 jobs) and Saint-Gobain (400 jobs), large public institutions such as Orange S.A., Documentation française, transport services such as La Poste, and the workshops of La Villette such as the Paris Métro and a large RATP bus depot.

77% of available jobs are today in services, transport, and retailing. Industrial activities are present with companies such as lampes Aric, Thyssen elevators, Messier-Bugatti-Dowty, and Vesuvius plc. Headquarters and administrative departments of large firms have also established here: Rhodia, KDI, Motul, Lapeyre-GME (3,400 staff), and Zurich Insurance).

New industries have developed in recent years:

- Telecommunications: (TelecityGroup, Interxion, Completel, etc.) and telematic services (Atos, FNAC Direct, Acticall, etc.)
- Audiovisual and Cinema: (Euromédia, Carrere Group, Studios d'Aubervilliers, Ciné-Lumières, Téléshoping, NPA, etc..)
- Textiles and fashion (Kookai, Redskins, Hugo Boss, Afflelou, etc.)

Another sign of this change has been the strengthening of wholesale and import-export activities. With more than 300 establishments concentrated in the Entrepôts et Magasins généraux de Paris (Warehouses and General Stores of Paris) (EMGP) and also around the Port of Aubervilliers (district of La Haie-Coq), this sector is a new business area in strong development. Haie-Coq imports are cheap manufactured goods of all kinds (textiles, watches, toys, decoration, gadgets), usually from Chinese products, which distributed throughout France. The CIFA - Fashion Business Center is the centre of this business.

== Culture and heritage ==
=== Civil heritage ===
- The Old Match Factory (1904) at 124 rue Henri-Barbusse (now Documentation française) is registered as a historical monument.
- The Maladrerie District: Renée Gailhoustet conceived the master plan for the Maladrerie District for a thousand housing units where there was previously a "quasi-slum". The land area of 9 hectares was urbanised in ten phases from 1975 to 1984 under the supervision of the architects Magda Thomsen, Vincent Fidon, and Yves and Luc Euvremer with the concept of a mainly continuous pedestrian space and varied sizes of buildings in relation to the existing low-rise buildings. As well as Green roofs, patios, and neat gardens, the project increased the number of covered walkways and service roads for the inhabitants which was at odds with the HLM stereotypes for construction and without reference to dividing into City blocks. In addition to a retirement home, offices, shops, a childcare centre, and a socio-cultural centre (Espace Renaudie), there are artists' studios which were not anticipated at the outset.
- Le Corbusier School, 1997–2003, expanded and rebuilt by the architect Pierre Riboulet.
- The Tower La Villette
- Fort d'Aubervilliers
- The Hôtel de Ville (town hall) contains the following items that are registered as historical objects:
  - Two decorative panels in the Hall of Commissions, depicting Abundance & Peace and Work (1928 & 1931)
  - Painting: Allegory of the Liberation (1945)

=== Religious heritage ===
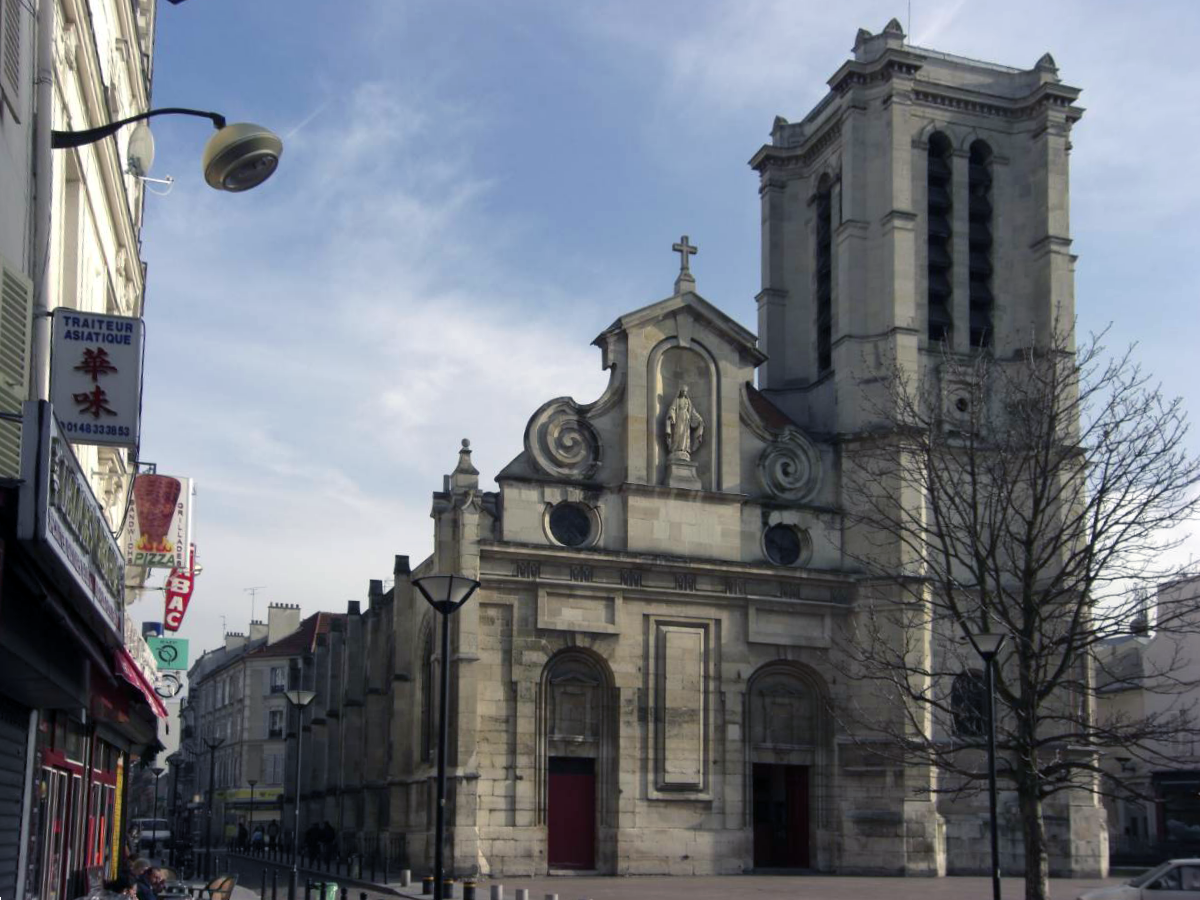
The Church of Notre-Dame-des-Vertus

- The Church of Notre-Dame-des-Vertus (16th century) is registered as a historical monument. The church is the old centre of Aubervilliers and it was built on a rectangular plan like a covered market. The vault of the nave is decorated with a keystone representing the Virgin. The bell tower was erected in 1541 under François I and the facade of the building in 1628 when Louis XIII decided to build in the Jesuit style to express his gratitude to the Virgin after his victory over the Protestants. The church contains many items which are registered as historical objects:
  - Statue: Virgin and Child (17th century)
  - Statue: Virgin and Child (19th century)
  - The Stained glass windows were blown out by an explosion in the gunpowder factory in La Courneuve fort on 15 March 1918 and they were redone by the Charles Champigneulle workshop. Many of them represent the miracles of Our Lady of Virtues. They are registered as three objects:
    - 3 Stained glass windows (Bays 3, 4, and 16) (20th century)
    - 13 Stained glass windows (Bays 1, 2, and 5 to 16) (20th century)
    - Stained glass window (St. Jacques & St. Christophe) (19th century)
- Reliquary and 2 Statues (19th century)
- Painting: Saint Mary of the Incarnation (19th century)
- Pedestal Organ (1780) The organ with musical instruments (1770–80) was the work of François-Henri Clicquot and is the only Iles-de-France instrument of the 17th century in the department. It was restored in 1990 by the organ builders Robert Chauvin, Louis Benoist, and Pierre Sarelot. The inauguration of the restoration took place in 1990 with organist Michel Chapuis and countertenor Daniel Delarue.
- Instrumental part of the Pedestal Organ (1780)
- Painting with frame: Christ in the garden of olives (18th century)
- 2 Statues: Angels adoring (16th century)

Stained glass windows in the Church of Notre-Dame-des-Vertus

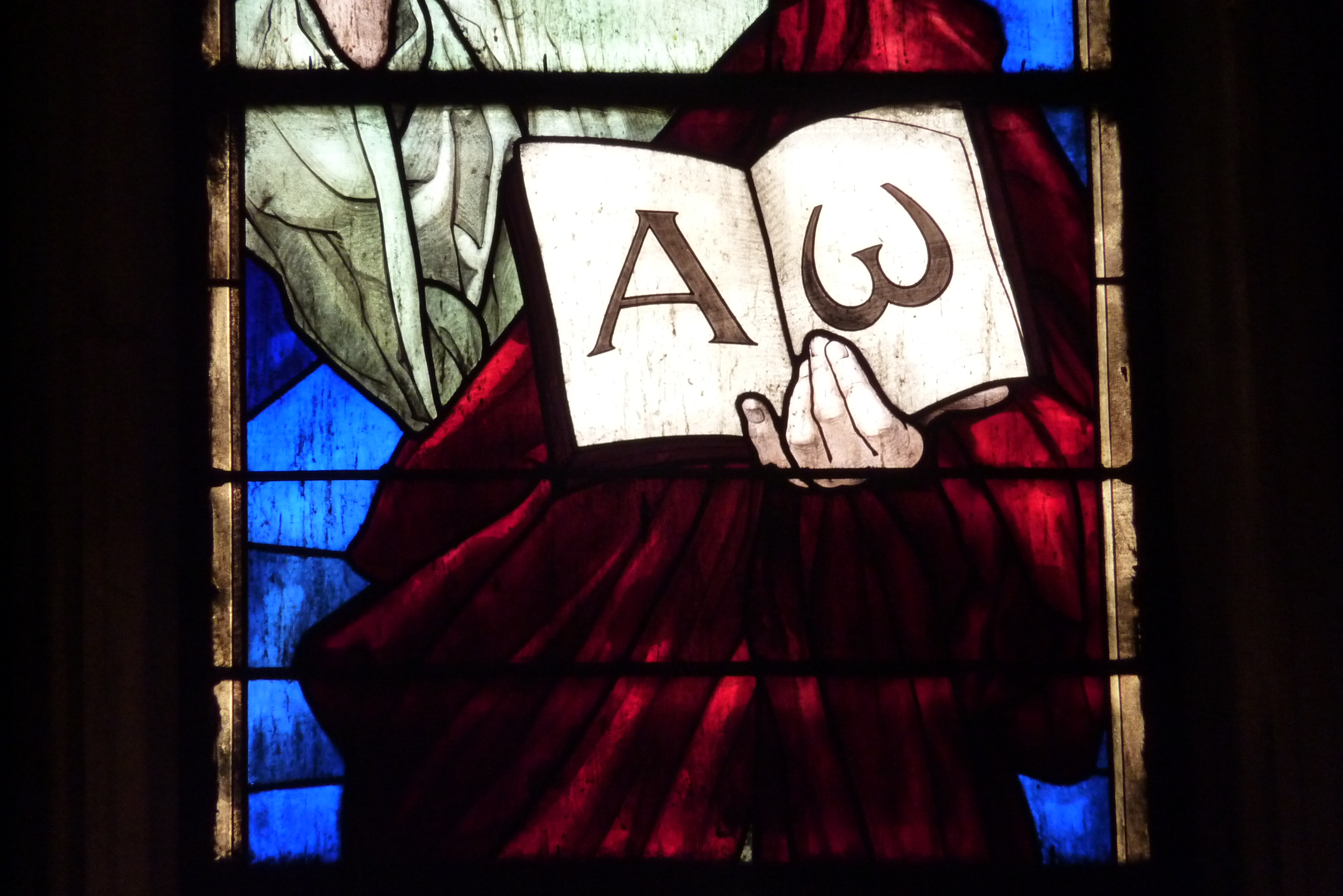

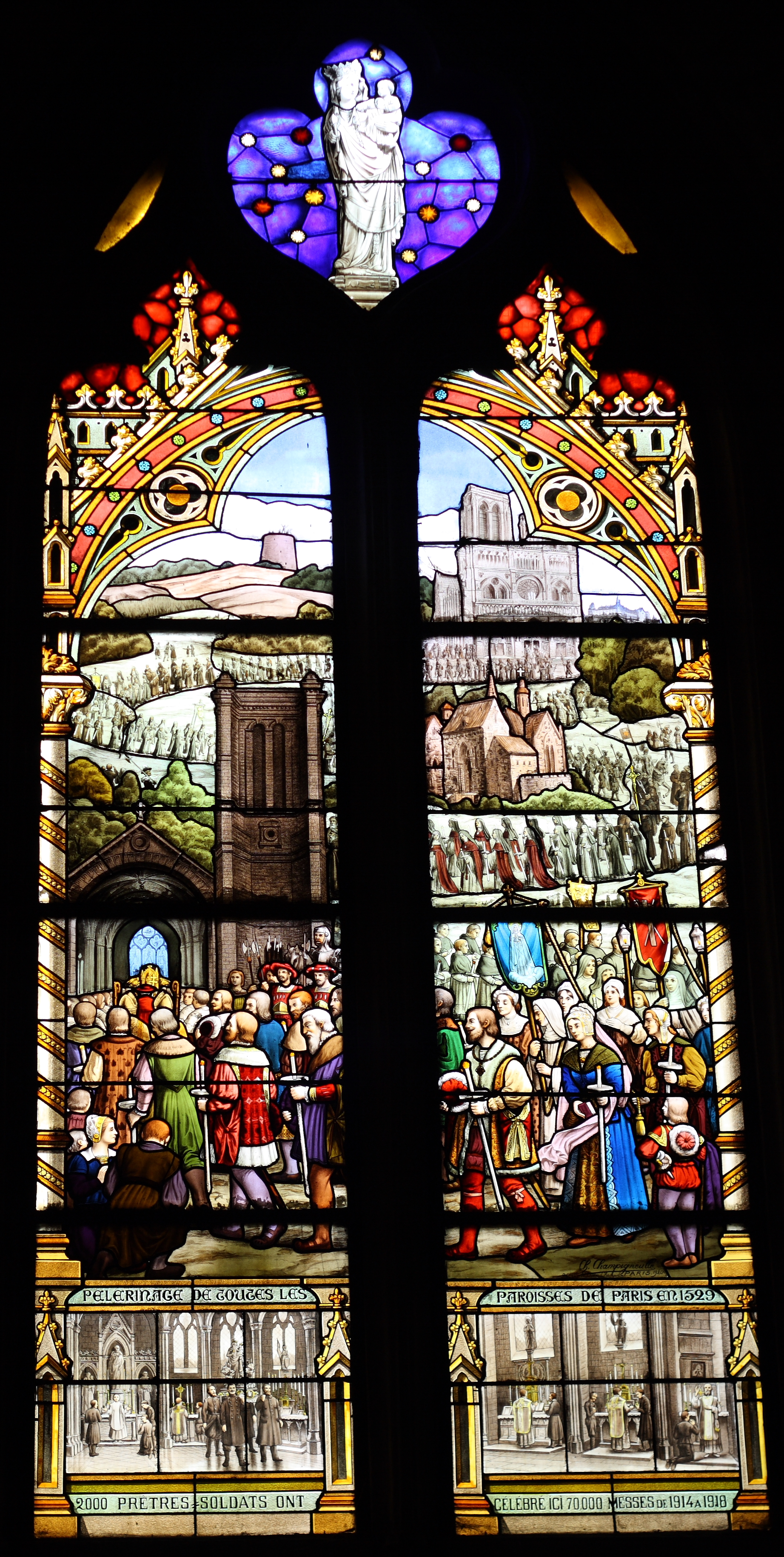

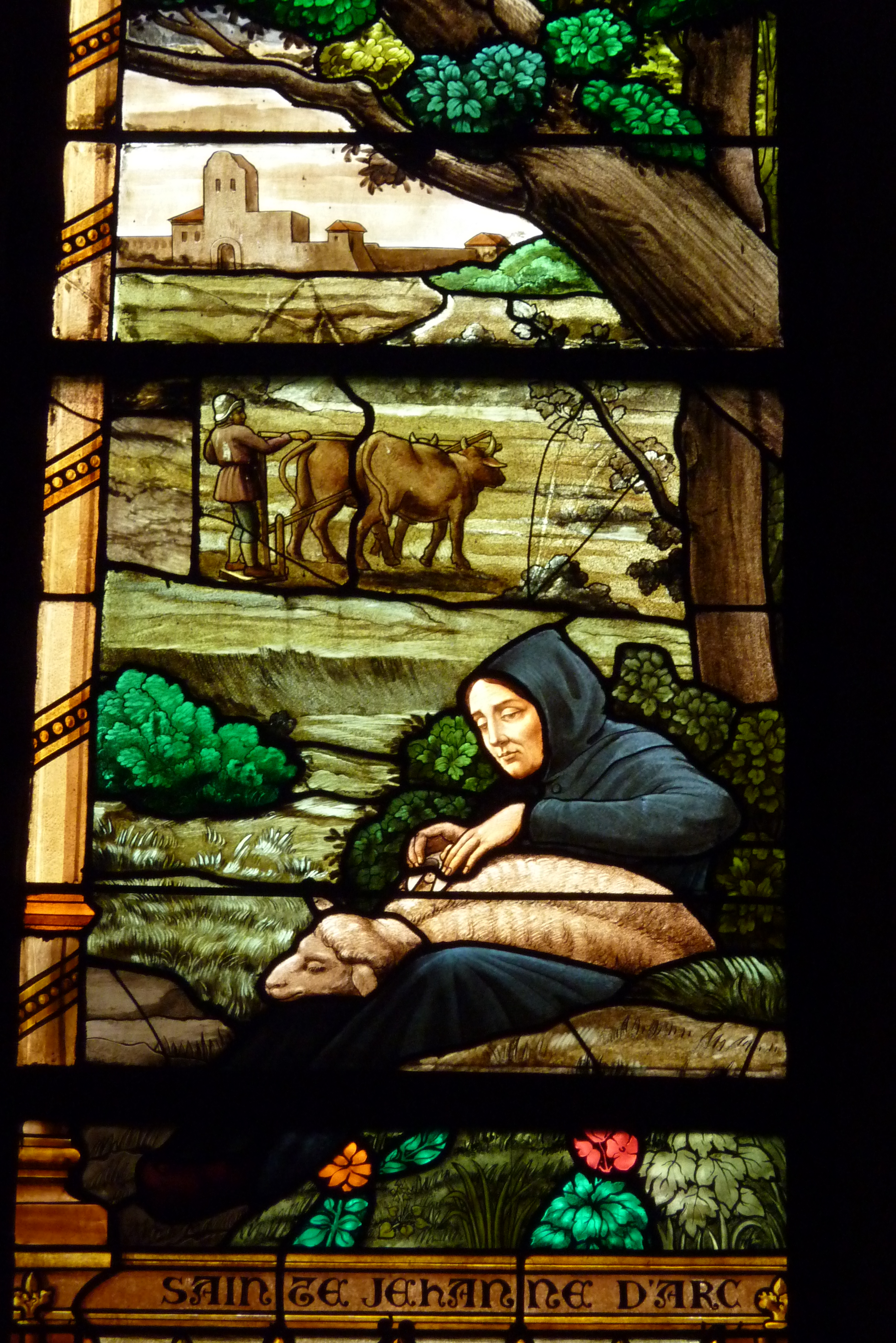

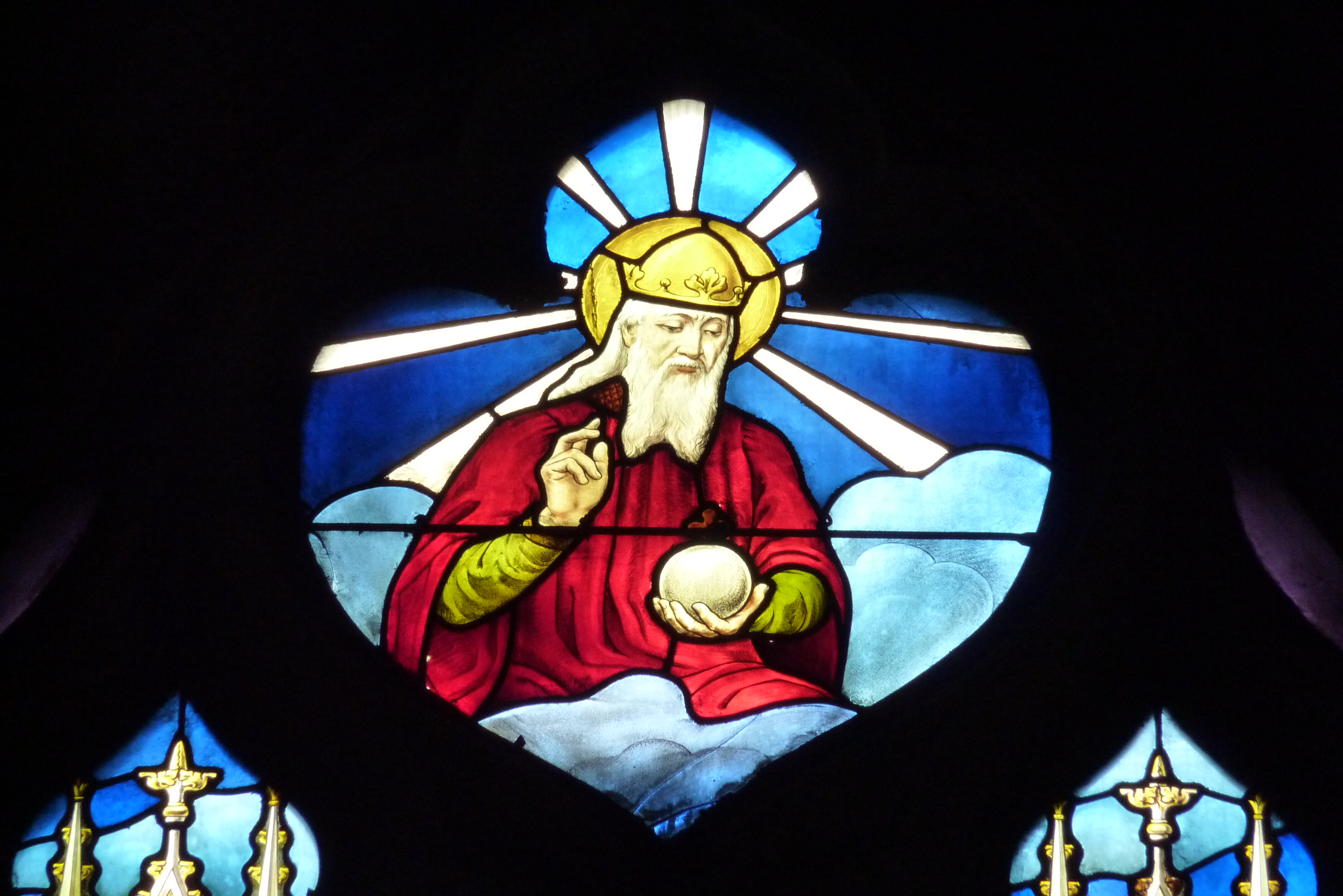

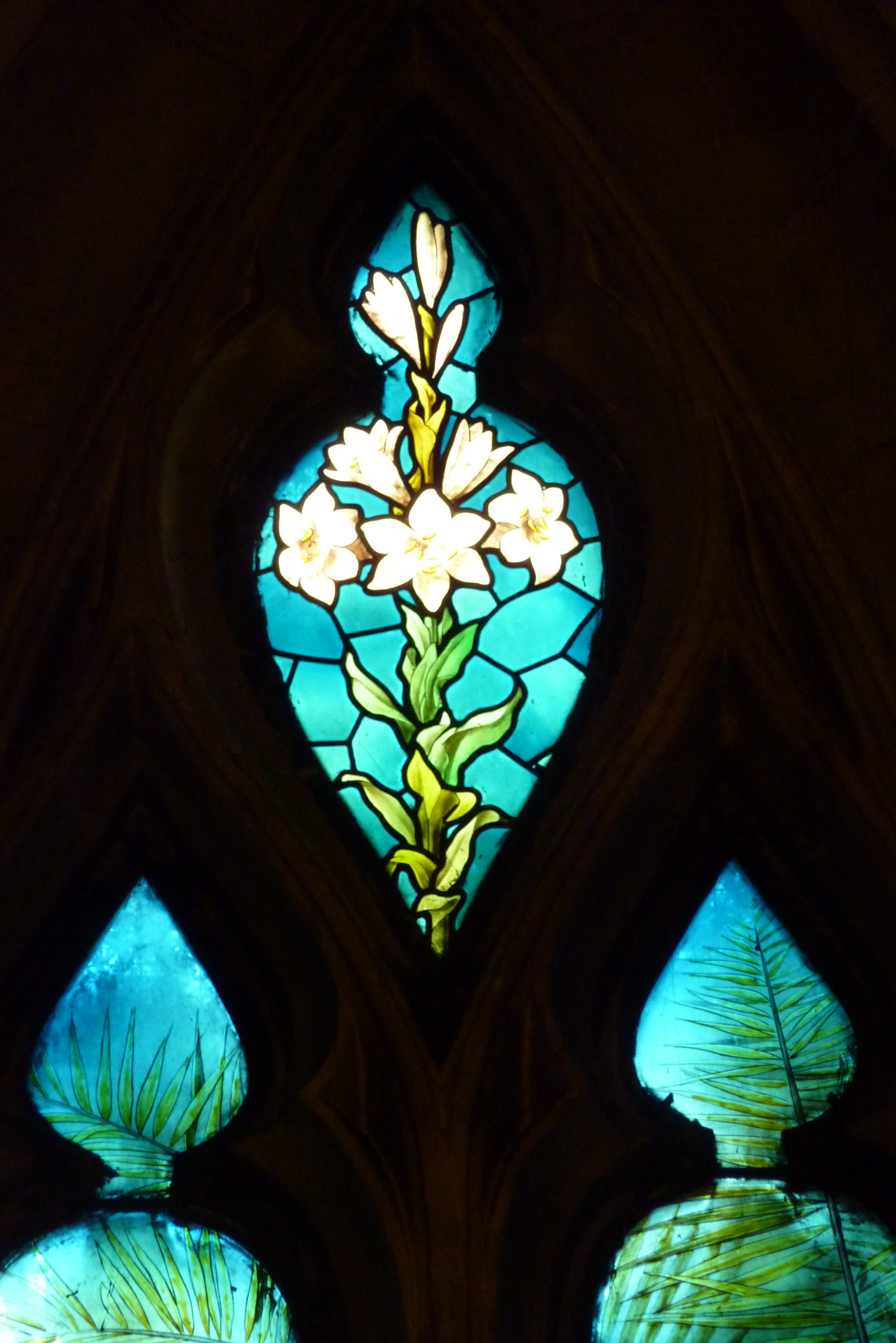

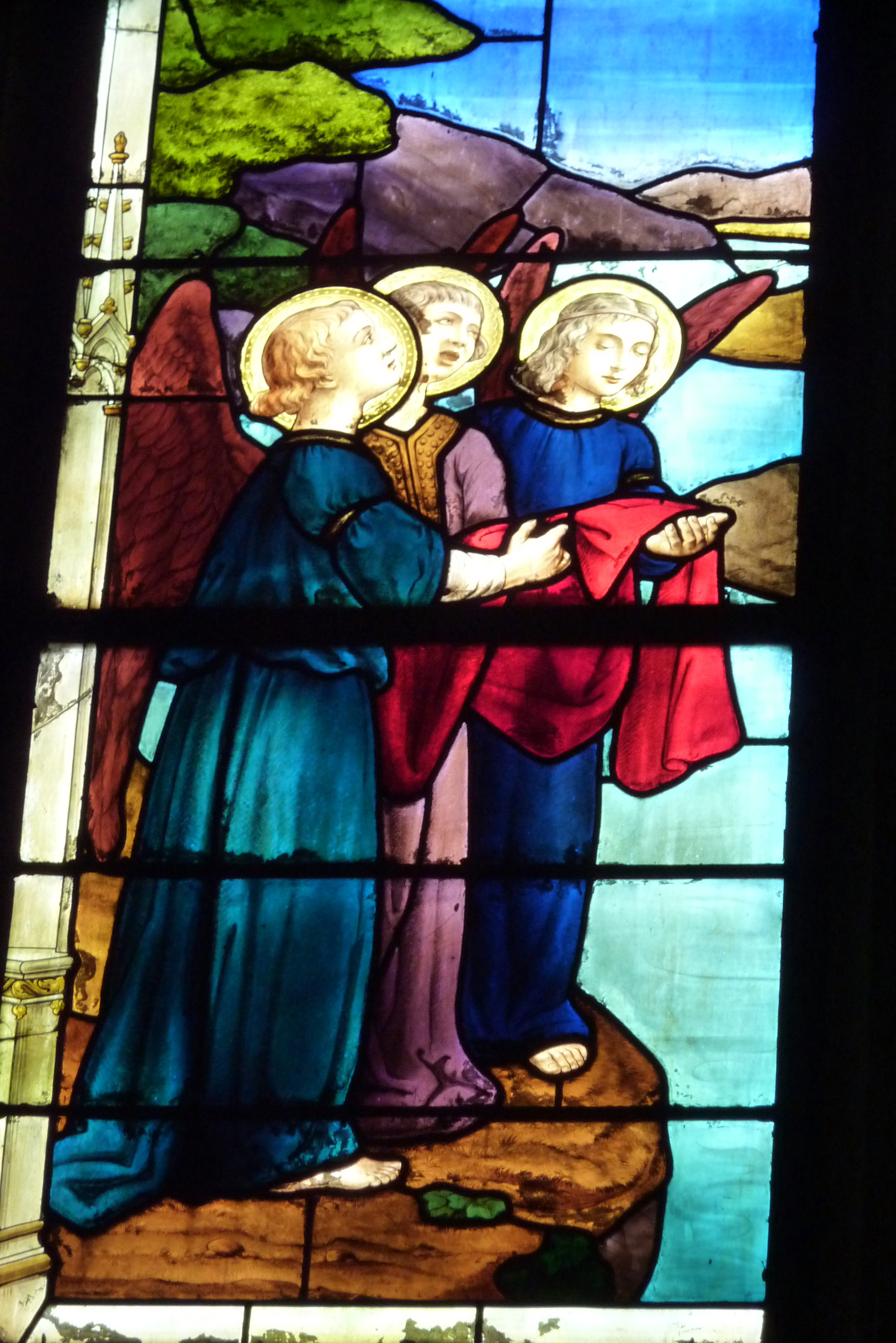

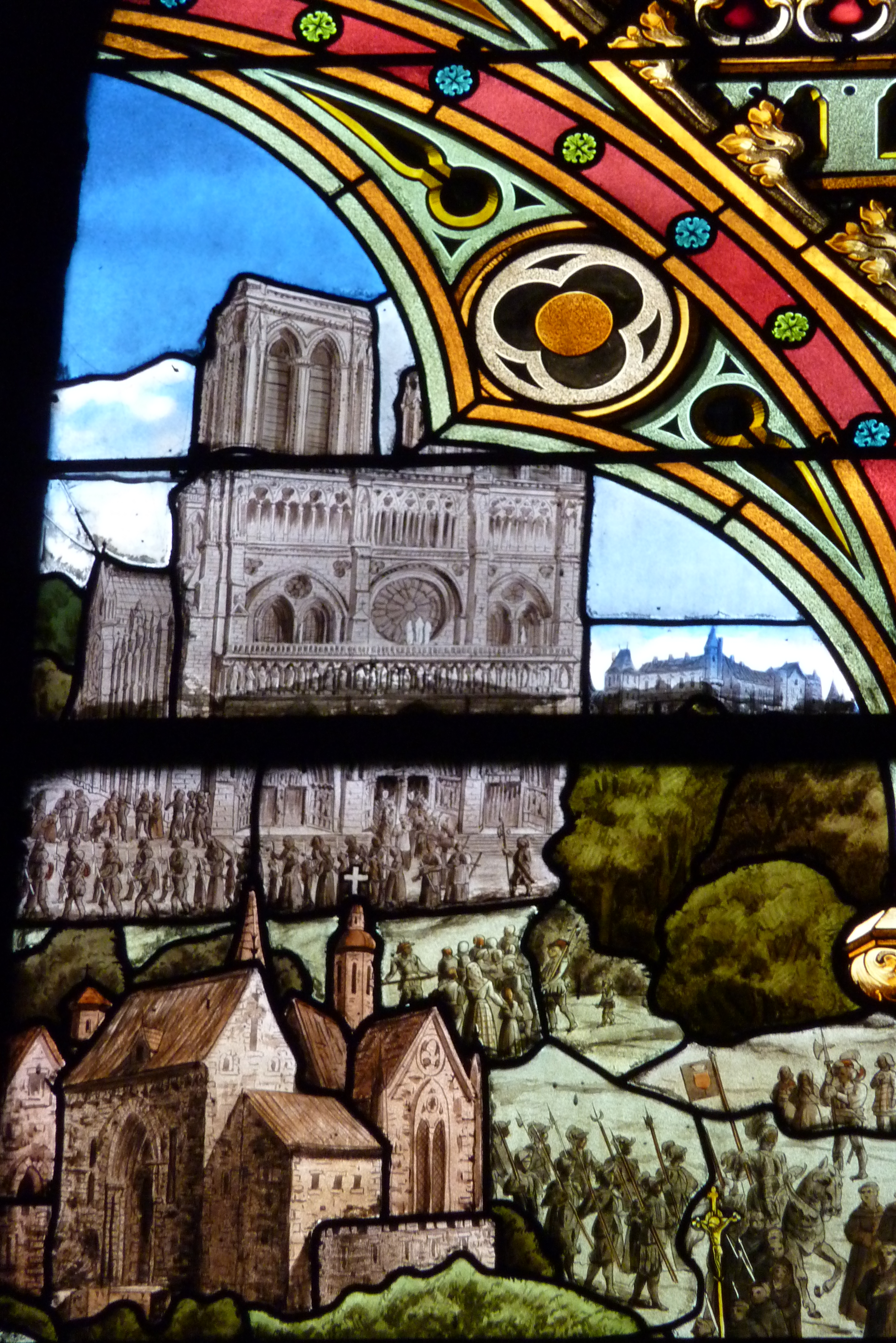

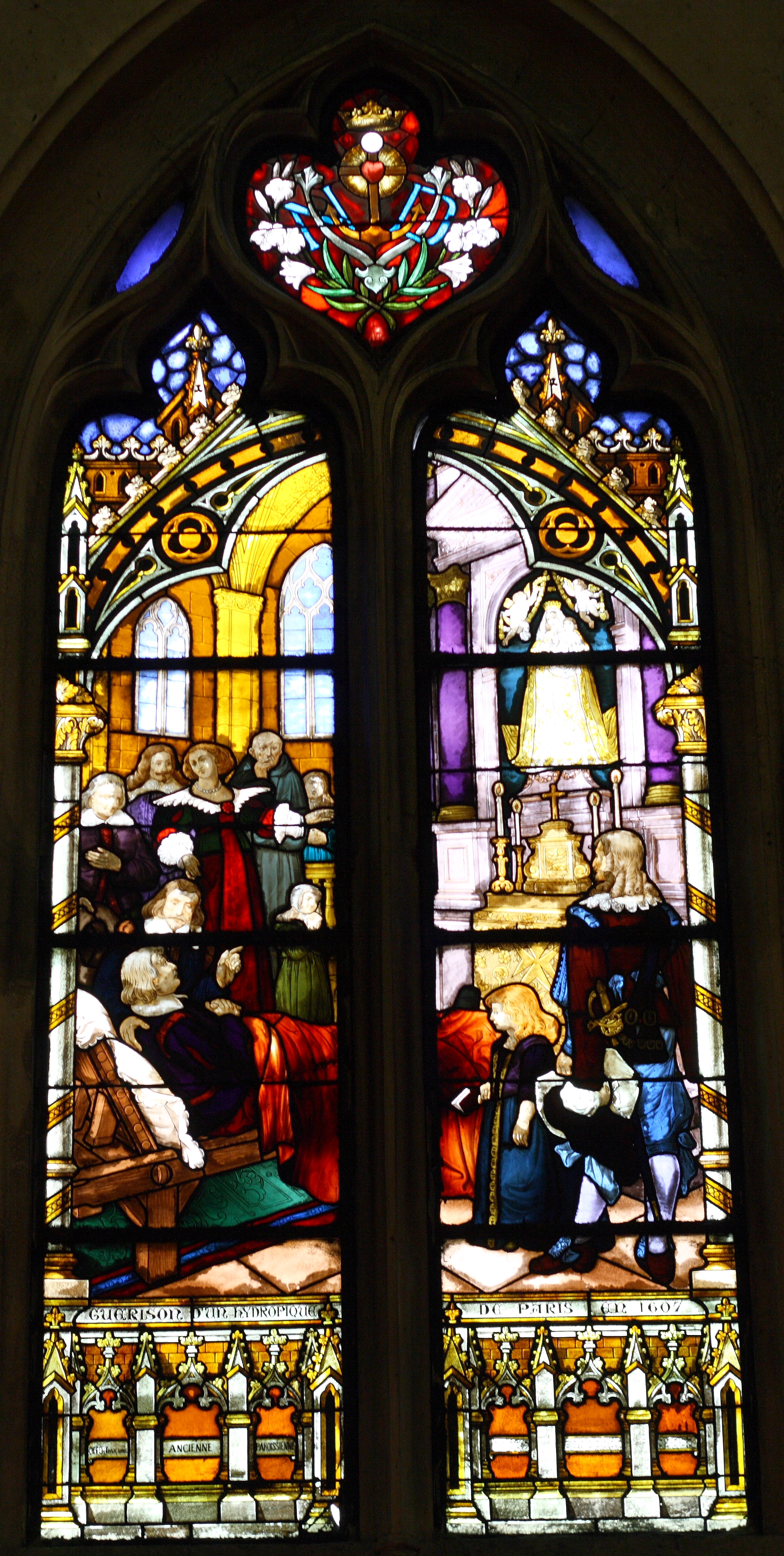

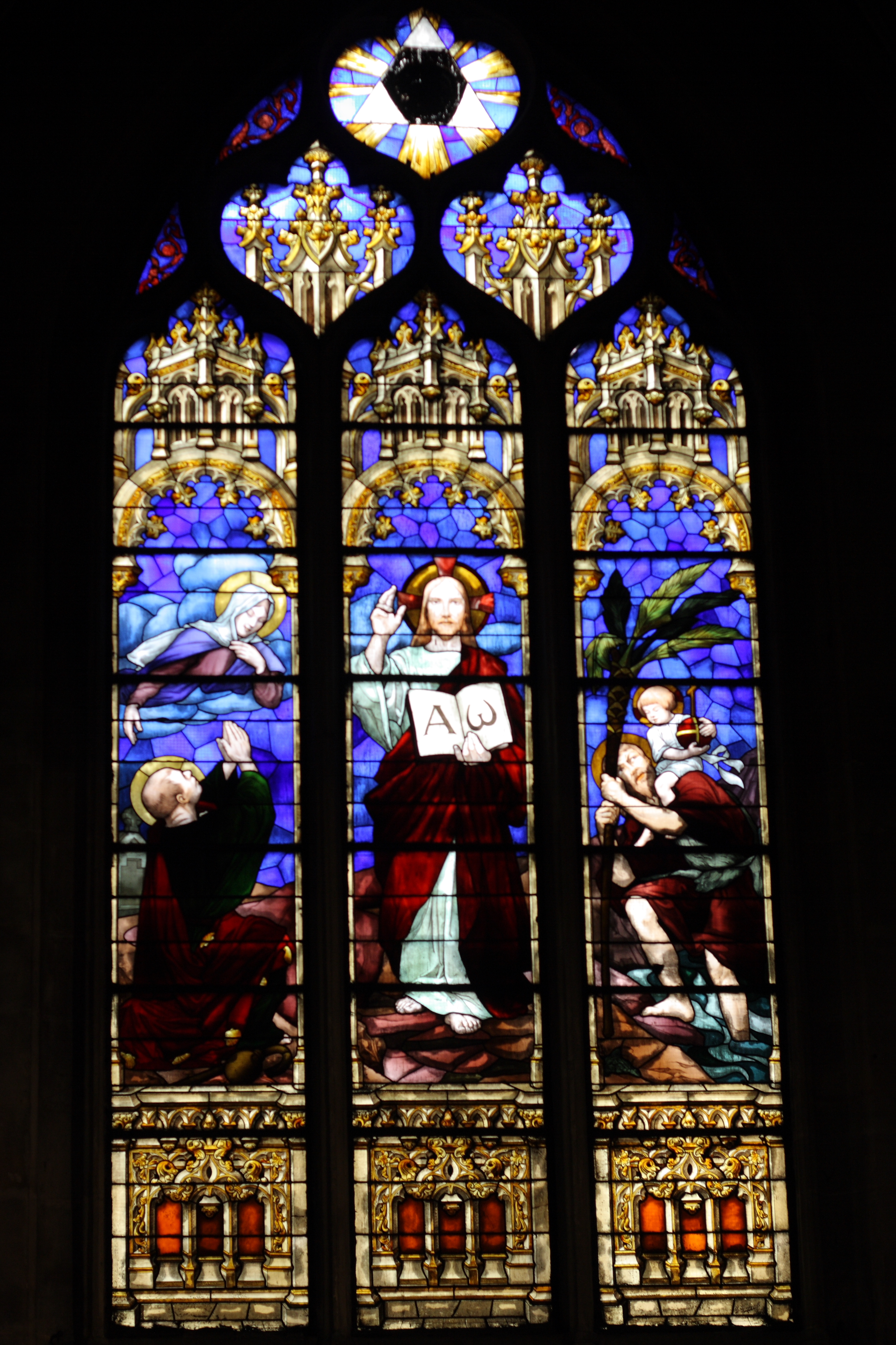

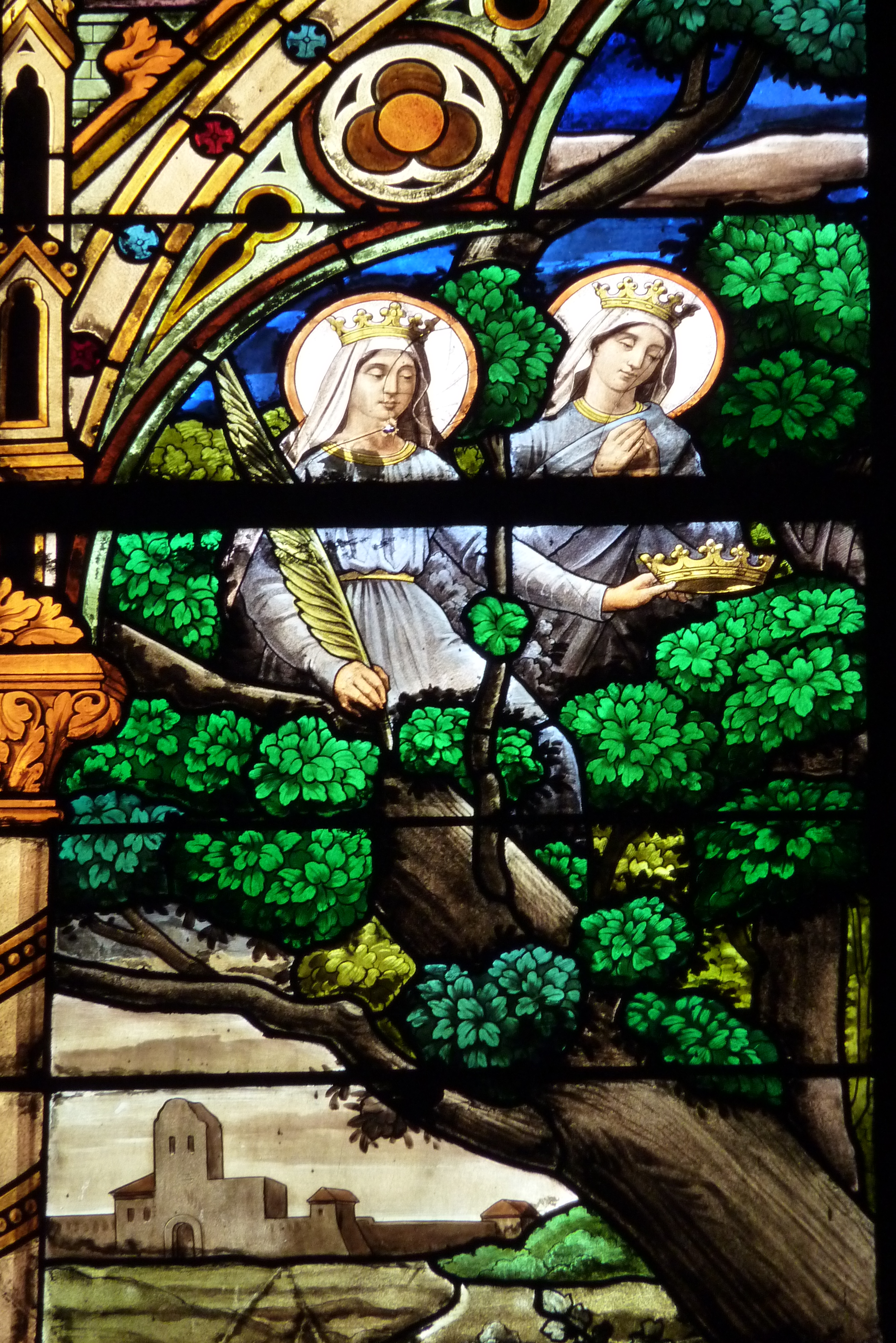

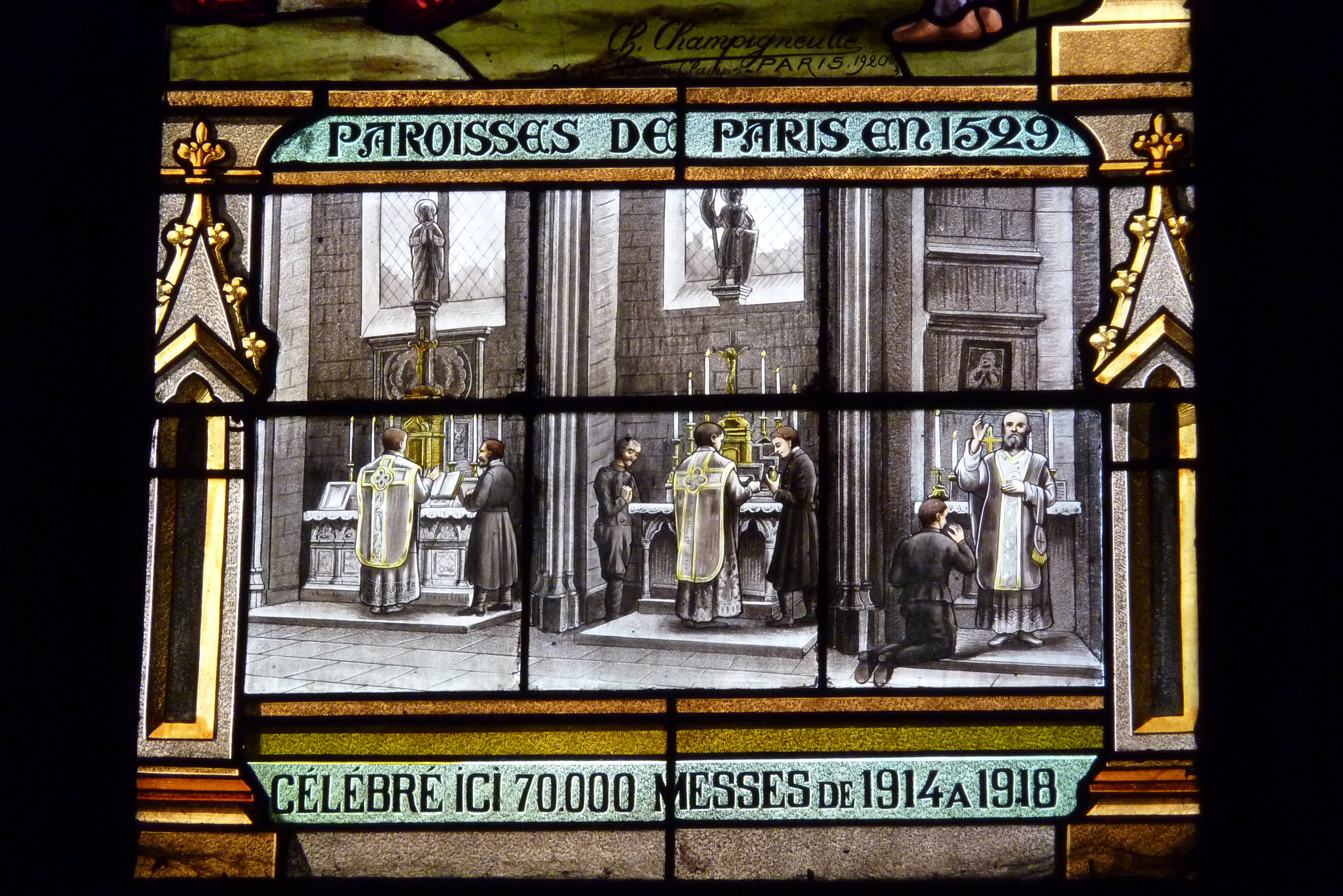

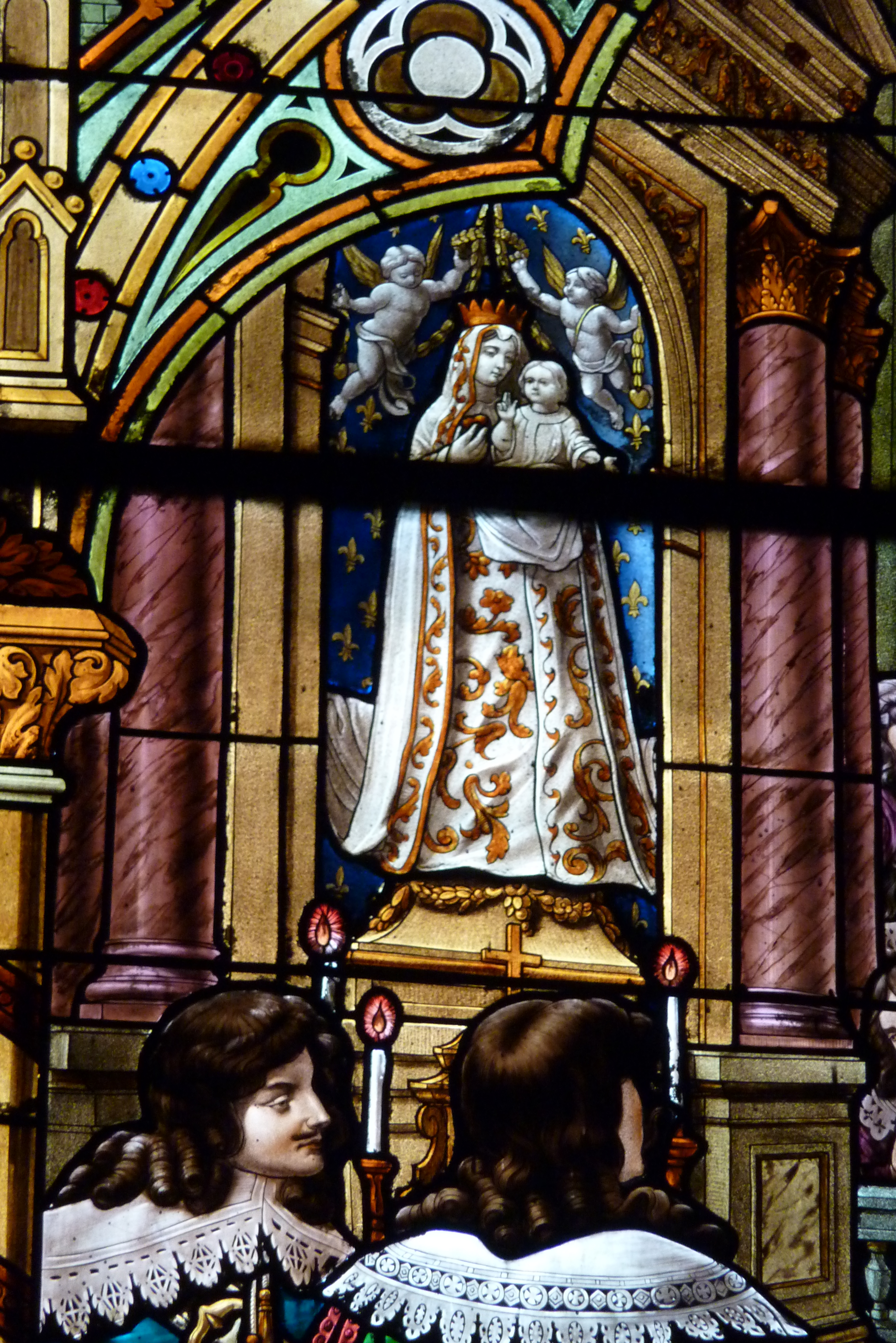

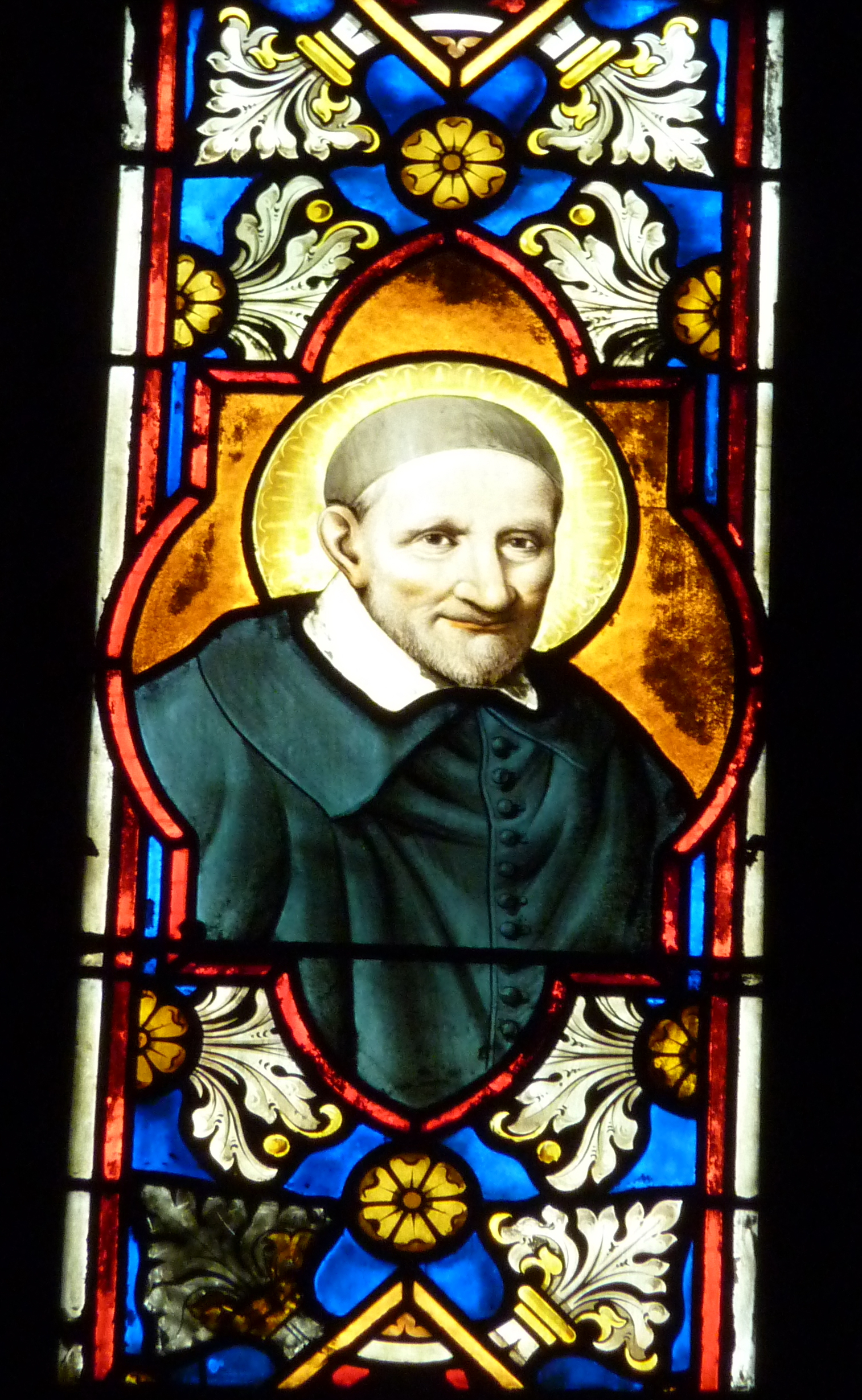

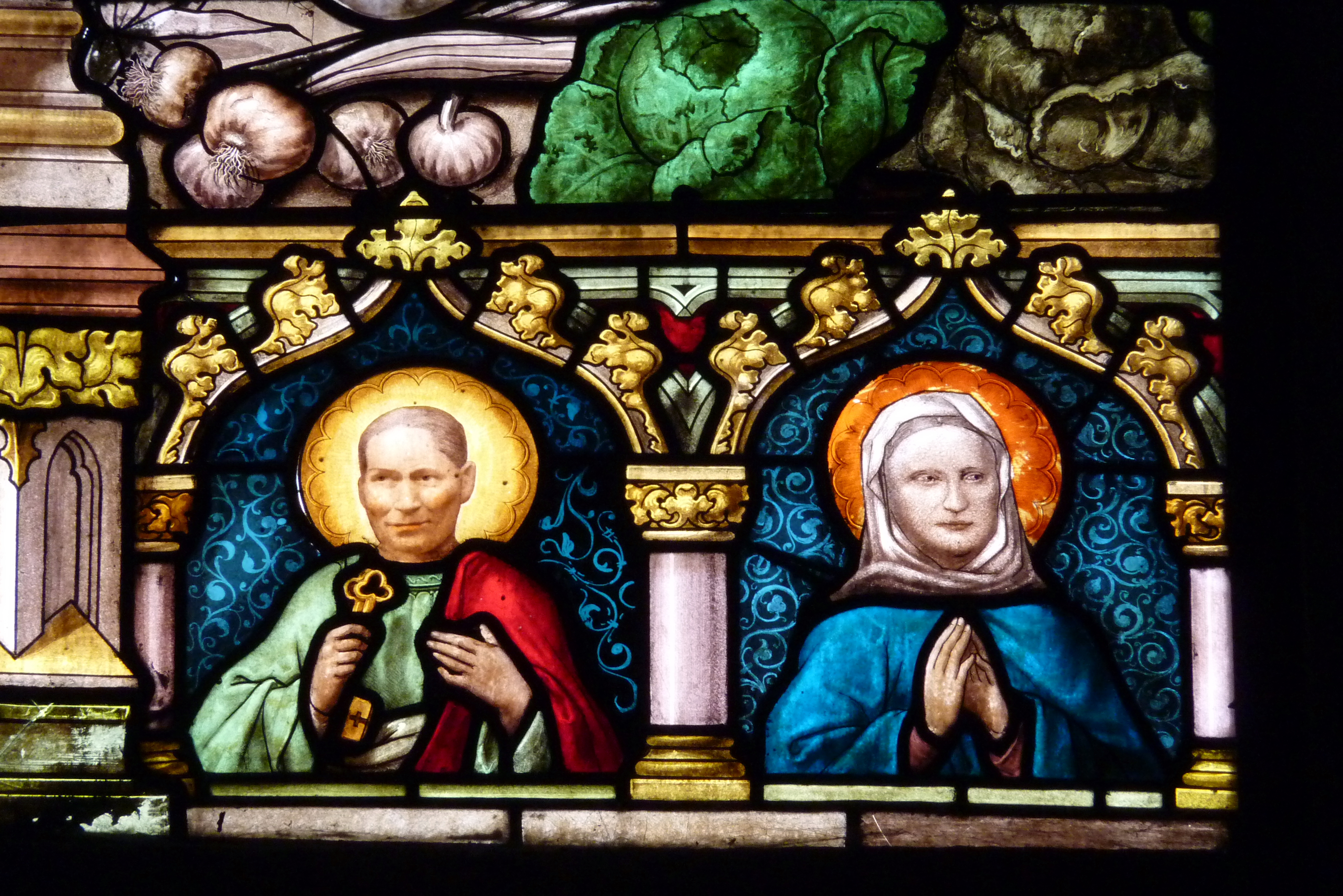

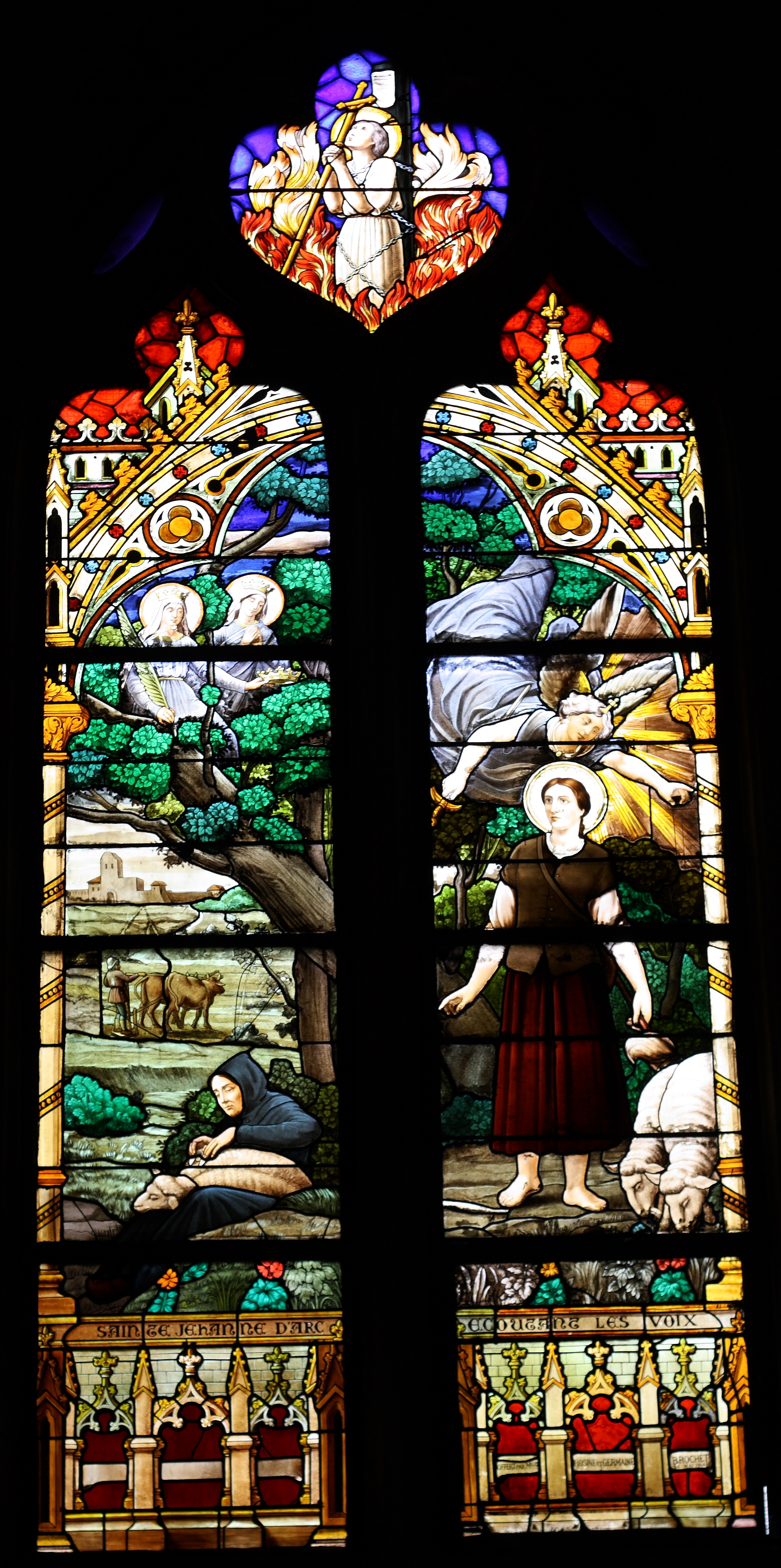

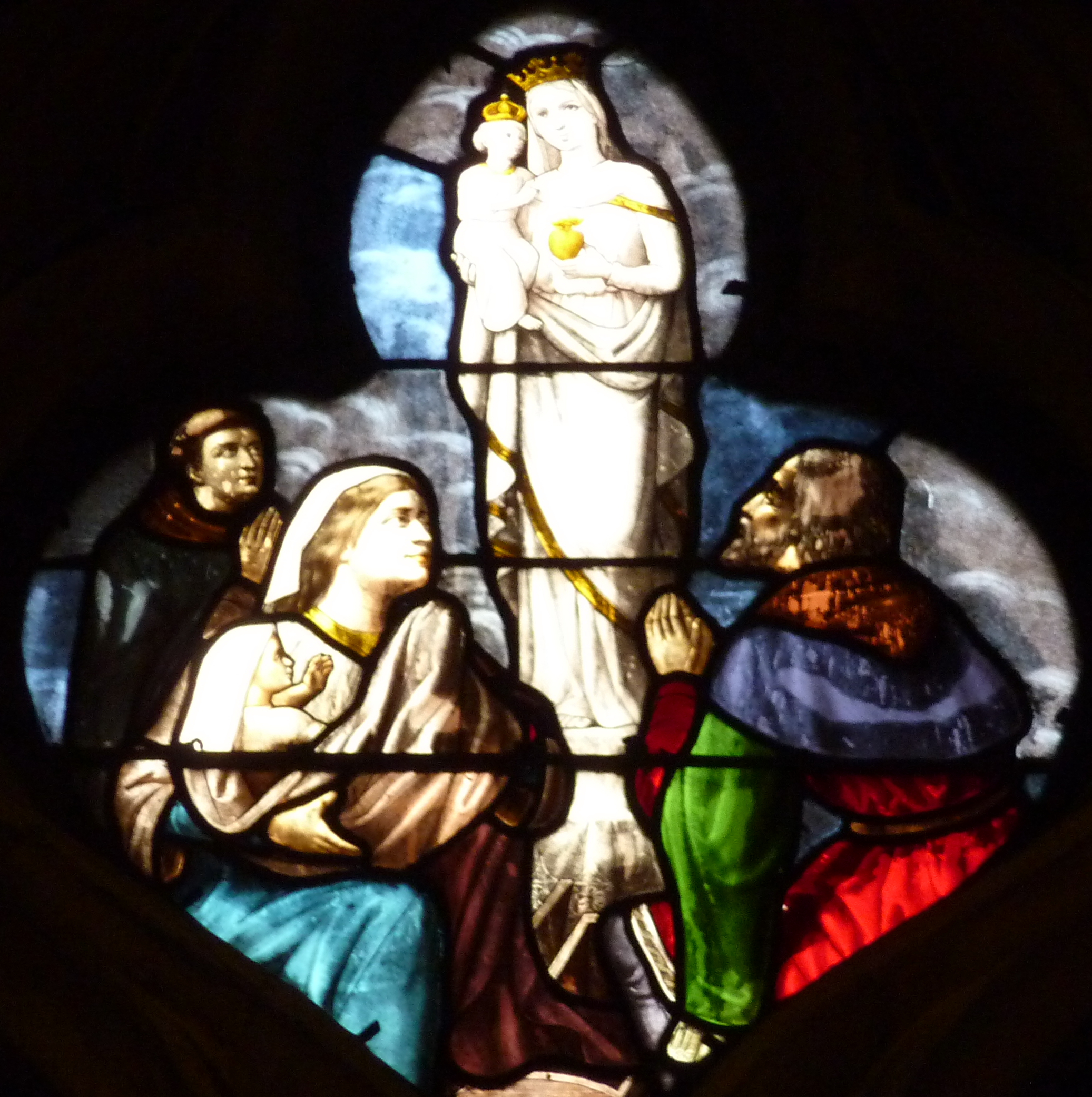

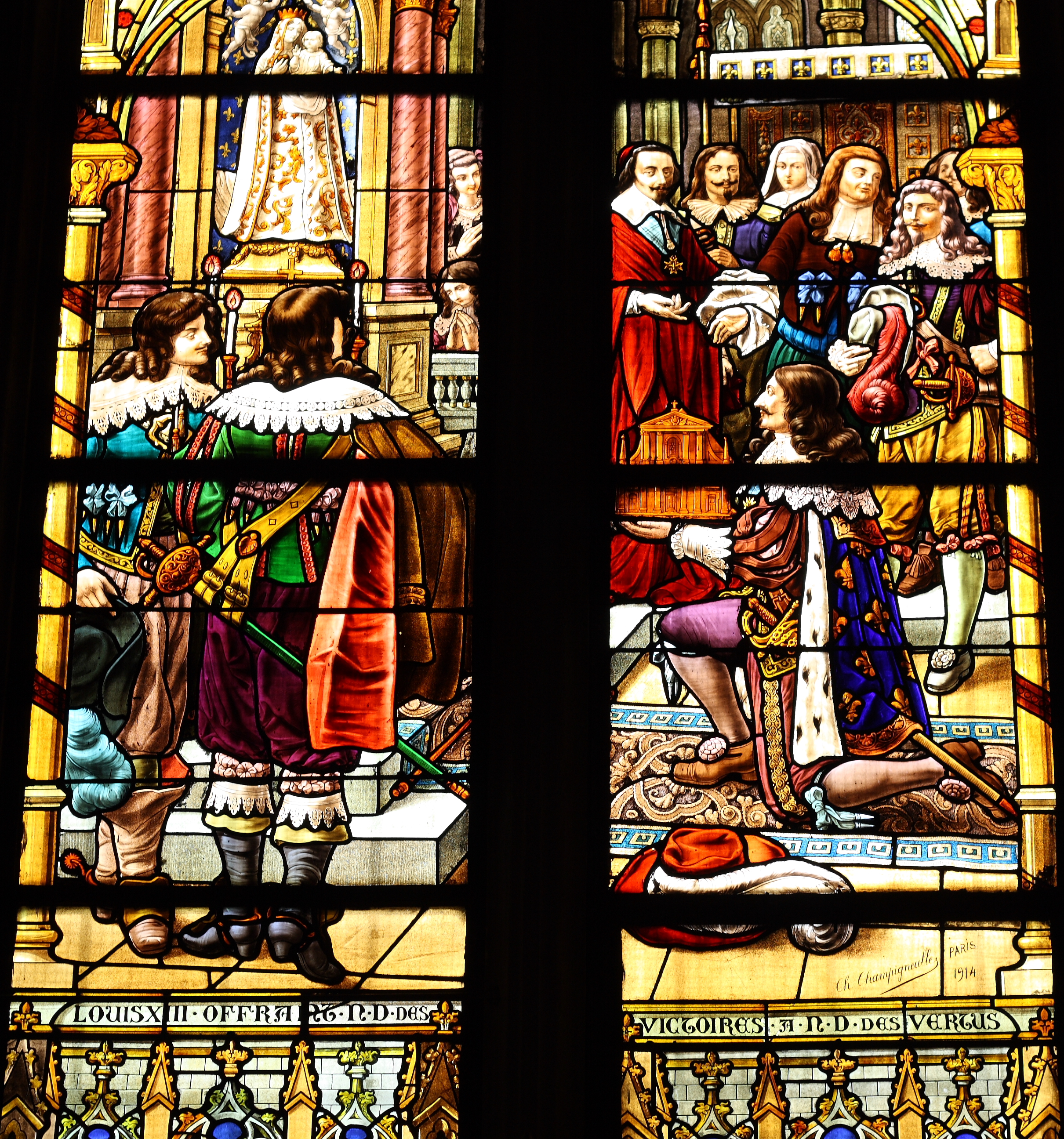

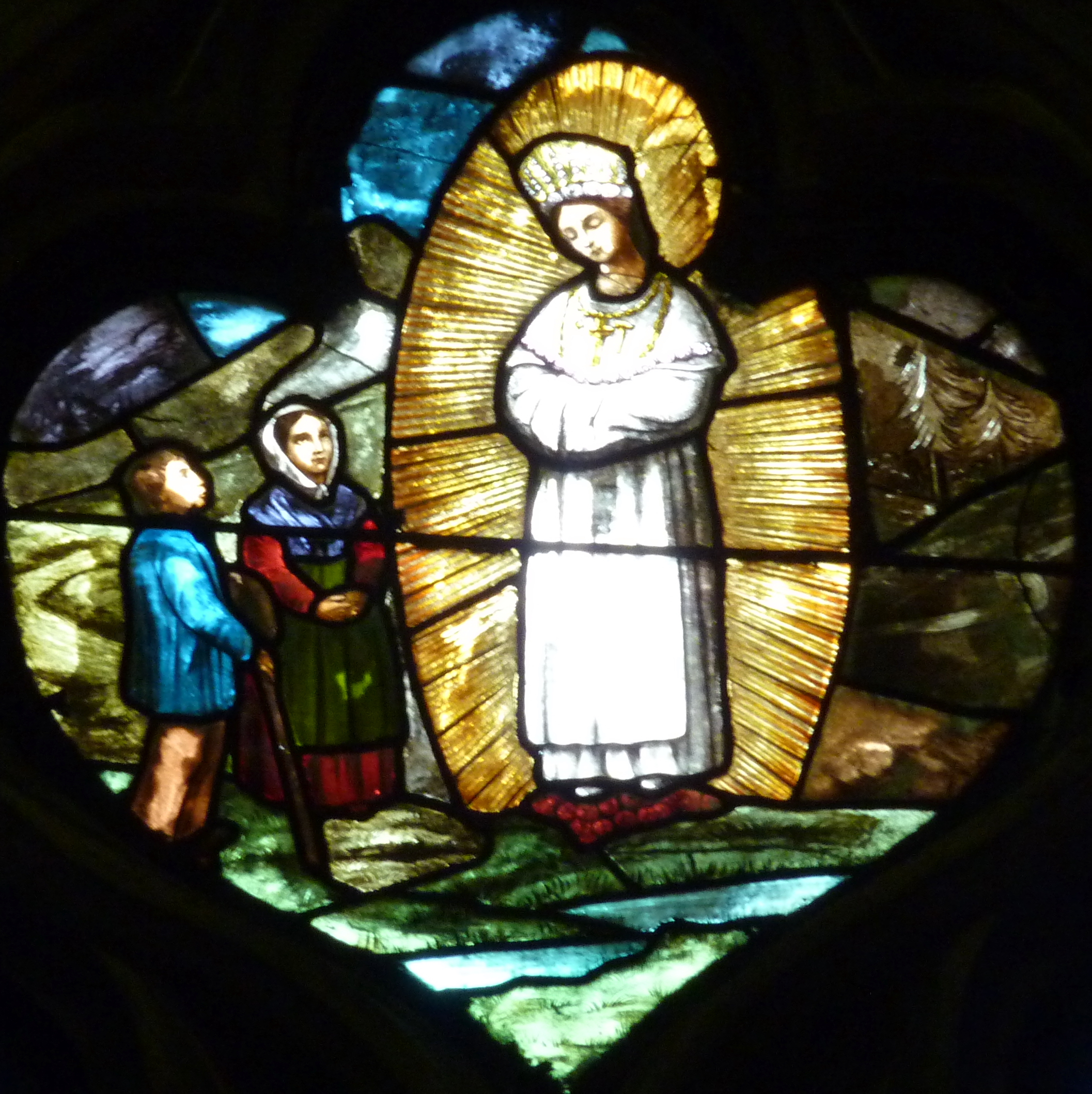

== Facilities ==
=== Education ===
Aubervilliers has 14 kindergartens, 15 elementary schools, 5 collèges (middle schools), and 4 lycées (high schools). The city also has three private establishments and several specialized institutions. The collèges (middle schools) include Diderot, Rosa Luxemburg, Jean Moulin, Gabriel Péri, and Henri Wallon. The lycées include Lycée Polyvalent D'Alembert, Lycée d'enseignement général et technologique Le Corbusier ("Le Corbusier High School of General and Technological Education"), Lycée professionnel Jean-Pierre Timbaud ("Jean Pierre Timbaud Vocational High School"), and Lycée d'enseignement général et technologique Henri Wallon ("Henri Wallon High School of General and Technical Education").

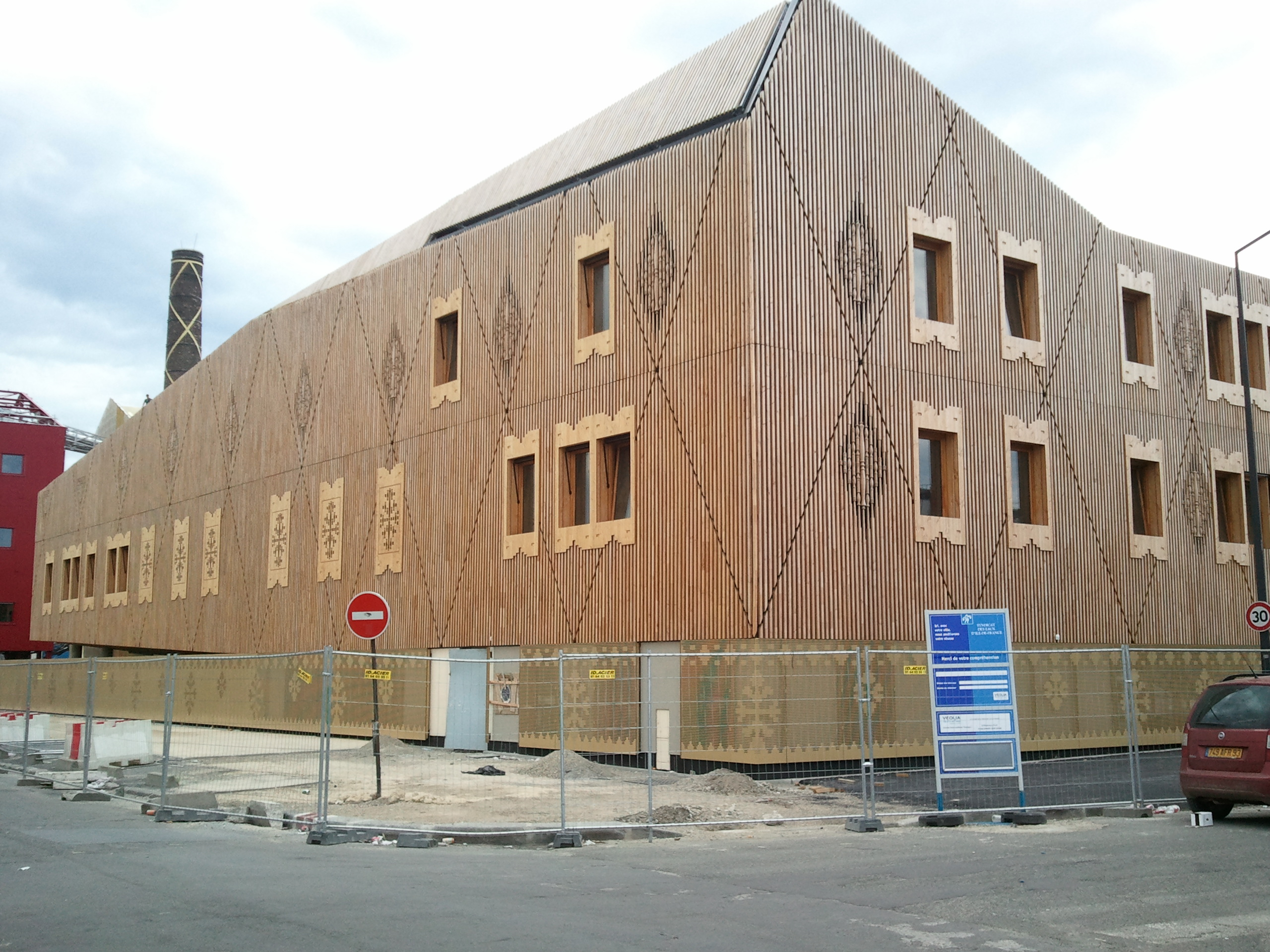
The Inter-communal School under construction in 2011

List of Schools and colleges in Aubervilliers

- Fort School (multi-lingual private School)
- Babeuf School
- Robespierre School
- Françoise Dolto School
- Jules Guesde School
- Victor Hugo School
- Jean Jaurès School
- Jean Macé School
- Joliot-Curie School
- Edgar Quinet School
- Paul-Langevin School
- Wangari Maathai School
- Notre-Dame-des-Vertus School
- Maximilien-Robespierre School
- Stendhal School
- Jules-Vallès School
- Eugène-Varlin School
- Taos Amrouche School
- Charlotte Delbo School
- Marc Bloch School
- Angela Davis School
- Anne Sylvestre School
- Pierre Brossolette
- Saint-Just School
- Jean-Jacques Rousseau School
- Paul Bert School
- Jean Perrin School
- Francine Fromond School
- Gerard Philippe School
- Jacques Prévert School
- Louise Michel School
- Kehilat-Chne-Or Jewish School
- Maria Cesarès Inter-communal School
- Diderot College
- Rosa-Luxembourg College
- Jean-Moulin College
- Gabriel-Péri College
- Saint-Joseph College (Private college)
- Henri-Wallon General and Technological College and School
- Réussite Islamic General and Technological College and School
- D’Alembert Universal School
- Le-Corbusier General and Technological School
- Jean-Pierre-Timbaud Vocational School

=== Hospitals and clinics ===
- La Roseraie European Hospital of Paris
- Henri Duchêne Centre
- Clos Bénard Hospital
- l’Orangerie Centre for Medical and Surgical Consultations
- Aubervilliers Polyclinic

=== Sports ===
- Athletics C.O.A.
- Athletics CMA
- Aikido
- Badminton, Auber'Bad
- Basketball (AABB)
- Bodybuilding
- Boules Lyonnaises
- Bridge
- Canoeing Outdoors CMA
- Chess
- Climbing Outdoors CMA
- Créole Relay sports and leisure of Aubervilliers
- Municipal Cycling of Aubervilliers 93
- Cycle-tourism
- Dance - Ballroom, Auber
- Dance - Caribbean, Colibri des Iles
- Dance - Handicap
- Dance - Hip-Hop, Ethnix Dream
- Dance - Oriental (ACAS)
- Dance - Salsa
- Diving CMA
- English Boxing - Boxing Beats
- Fencing
- Flash Boxing of Auber. Thai boxing
- Football A.S.J.A.
- Football F.S.G.T.
- Football, F.C.M.A.
- Gymnastics Sportive CMA
- Handball CMA
- Hiking
- Indans'Cité
- Judo, Jujitsu CMA
- Karaté club of Aubervilliers
- Karaté for all
- Kung-fu Boxing Club
- Long-distance running
- MMA Fitness Centre
- OMJA
- Paintball Challenge
- Pétanque (Casanova)
- Pétanque (Gabriel Péri)
- Pétanque (Théâtre)
- Physical Culture CMA
- Qwan Ki Do
- Swimming CMA
- Top Forme Women's Gym
- Table tennis
- Tennis
- Totof Muay Thaï
- Volleyball relaxation Aubervilliers
- Yoga and Wellness
- Youth Sports Association of Aubervilliers (ASJA)

=== Theatre ===
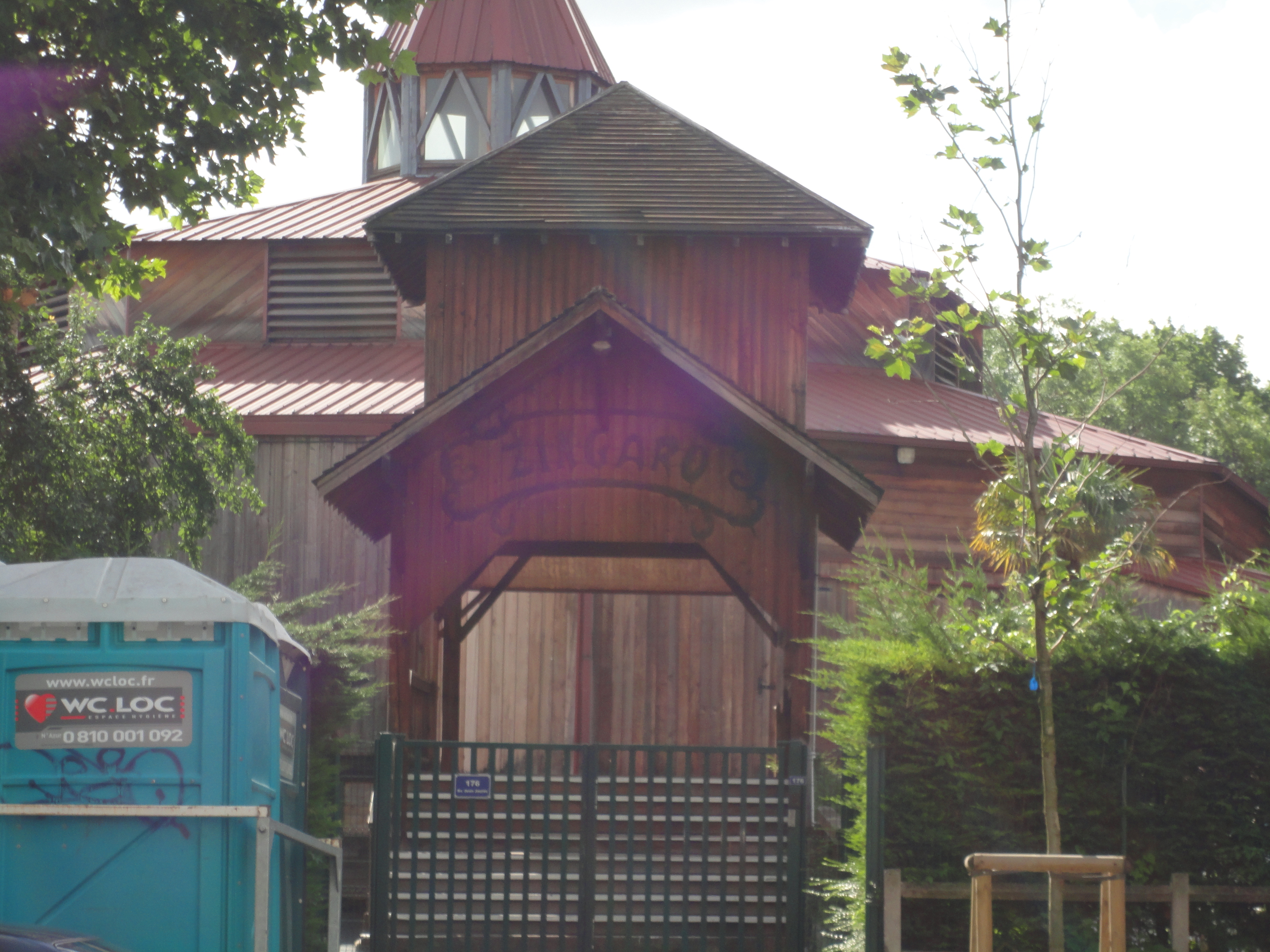
Entry to the Zingaro Equestrian Theatre

- The Theatre of the Commune was one of the first national drama centres established in the suburbs for more than thirty years. It is now run by Didier Bezace who in 2005 received two Molière Awards including for the staging of the play La Version de Browning.
- The Zingaro Equestrian Theatre is headed by Bartabas and is established at Fort d'Aubervilliers.

=== Cinema ===
- Le Studio Cinema occupies in the same building as the theatre. It is classified as an Arthouse (Art et Essai) and has, in addition to its regular programmes, a Festival pour éveiller les regards (Festival to raise eyes) aimed at young people.

=== Libraries ===
- Aubervilliers has four libraries, including André Breton, Paul Eluard, Henri Michaux, and Saint-John Perse.

=== Arts ===
- The Espace Jean-Renaudie is a visual arts centre (Capa) in the Maladrerie district.
- The Métafort d'Aubervilliers is located at 4 Avenue de la Divion Leclerc.
- The Laboratoires d'Aubervilliers offers residencies for artistic research projects in dance, visual arts, theatre, cinema, and interdisciplinary projects. It is located at 41 Rue Lecuyer.
- The Villa Mais d’Ici is a cultural centre to promote small cultural businesses. It is located at 77 Rue des Cités.
- The Regional Conservatory of music, theatre, and dance of Aubervilliers-La Courneuve has been run since 1974 in partnership with La Courneuve. It trains 1,400 students in musical, voice, theatre and dance disciplines. Opera productions are mounted regularly, providing an important partnership with schools and cultural organisations in the department and Ile-de-France.

== Notable people ==
=== Historical figures ===
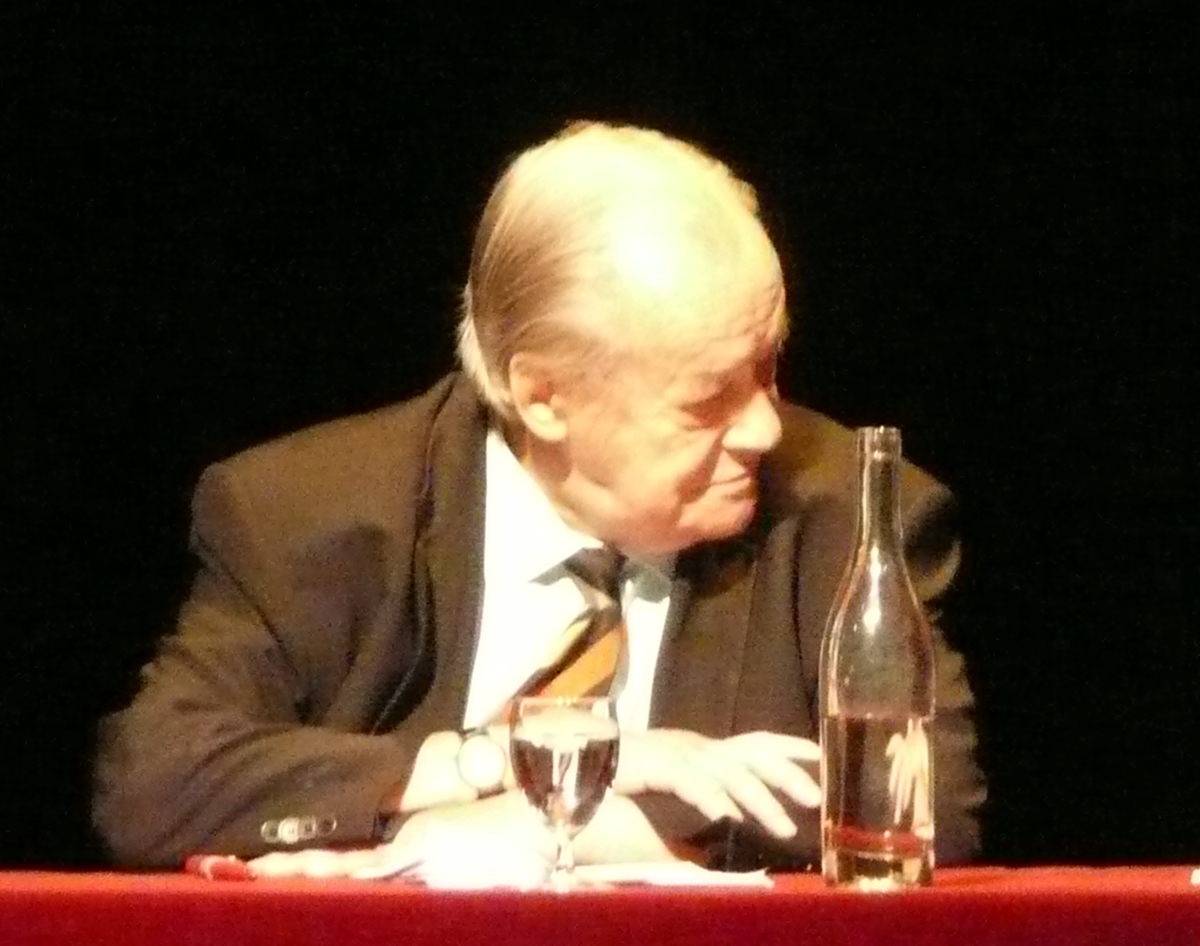
Jack Ralite in Aubervilliers in 2011

- Henri IV, King of France, stayed in the commune during the Siege of Paris in 1590.
- Isaac La Peyrère, French writer, died here in 1676.
- Léon Jouhaux (1879–1954), trade unionist, won the Nobel Peace Prize in 1951. He discovered his militantism when working in the Match Factory of Aubervilliers-Pantin in 1895 at the age of 16.
- Pierre Laval, former Senator-Mayor of Aubervilliers between the two world wars, a major collaborator with Germany during the Second World War, head of the Vichy government.
- Charles Tillon, former MP for Aubervilliers. Resistance fighter and member of the French Communist Party, he was Mayor of Aubervilliers at the Liberation of France.
- Jack Ralite, Communist Senator and former Deputy Mayor of Aubervilliers, he was Minister of Health under François Mitterrand from 1981 to 1983.

==== Artistes ====
- Madeleine Vionnet (22 June 1876 – 2 March 1975), French fashion designer, spent her childhood in Aubervilliers
- Jean-Baptiste Mondino (born 1949), French artist and fashion photographer, born in Aubervilliers
- Isabelle Mergault (born 11 May 1958), French actress and director, was born in Aubervilliers.
- Yasmine Belmadi (26 January 1976 – 18 July 2009), actor, grew up in Aubervilliers and is buried in the cemetery at Pont blanc.
- Didier Daeninckx (born 27 April 1949), French detective novel writer
- Thomas Hirschhorn (born 16 May 1957 in Bern, artist of Swiss origin
- Virginie Ledoyen (born in Aubervilliers 15 November 1976), actress
- Samy Seghir (born in Aubervilliers 29 July 1994), actor
- Fred Chichin (1 May 1954 – 28 November 2007), musician
- Jacques Prévert (4 February 1900 – 11 April 1977) dedicated a long poem to the city called Aubervilliers, part of his Paroles collection. He also wrote a review of the film Aubervilliers (1945), directed by Eli Lotar.
- Marcel Carné (18 August 1906 – 31 October 1996) immortalised working culture in his film Le jour se lève, (1939) where Jean Gabin played the tragic day of a worker
- Mano Solo (24 April 1963 – 10 January 2010) sang Les Chevaux d’Aubervilliers, referring top the Zingaro Equestrian Theatre of Bartabas.
- Pierre Perret (born 9 July 1934) dedicated a song to the city: Salut l’ami d’Aubervilliers.
- Mireille Mathieu (born 22 July 1946) sang Noël d’Aubervilliers.
- Édith Piaf (19 December 1915 – 10 October 1963) sang Les Neiges de Finlande, text by Henri Contet 1958; Aubervilliers was mentioned in it.
- Philippe Clay (7 March 1927 – 13 December 2007) sang Le Festival d’Aubervilliers.
- Léo Ferré (24 August 1916 – 14 July 1993) evoked Aubervilliers in his song Monsieur tout-blanc.
- Danièle Thompson (born 3 January 1942) filmed many scenes of his film Le code a changé at Aubervilliers in Spring 2008.
- Reynaldo Hahn (9 August 1874 – 28 January 1947): Ciboulette, Operetta in 3 acts, 1923, libretto by Robert de Flers and Francis de Croisset, the third part of Act 2 is located in "the interior of a farmhouse at Aubervilliers" in 1867. The heroine, called Ciboulette, was the daughter of local market gardeners.

=== Sportsmen ===
- Fousseni Diabaté (born 18 October 1995 in Aubervilliers), footballer at Leicester City
- Abou Diaby (born 11 May 1986), French international footballer
- Mohamed Fares (born 15 February 1996 in Aubervilliers), footballer at SPAL
- Fabrice Fernandes (born 29 October 1979 in Aubervilliers), former footballer
- Ibrahim Tall (born 23 June 1981 in Aubervilliers, footballer at FC Stade Nyonnais
- Christophe Kempé (born 2 May 1975 in Aubervilliers), French international handball player at Toulouse Handball
- Steeve Elana (born 11 July 1980 in Aubervilliers), footballer at Gazélec Ajaccio
- Martin Ekani (born 21 April 1984 in Aubervilliers), former footballer at Angers SCO
- Nader Ghandri (born 18 February 1995 in Aubervilliers), Tunisian professional footballer who currently plays for Club Africain and the Tunisia national team
- Brice Jovial (born 25 January 1984 in Aubervilliers), Former Guadeloupe international footballer
- Loick Landre (born 5 May 1992), footballer at Genoa
- Geoffrey Malfleury (born 12 April 1988 in Aubervilliers), footballer
- Soni Mustivar (born 12 February 1990 in Aubervilliers), Haiti international footballer
- Anatole Ngamukol (born 15 January 1988 in Aubervilliers), footballer at Stade de Reims
- Kalidiatou Niakate(born 15 March 1995 in Aubervilliers), handball player
- Edwin Ouon (born 26 January 1981 in Aubervilliers), Rwanda international footballer
- Salahdine Parnasse (born 12 December 1997 in Aubervilliers), mixed martial artist
- Guillaume Yango (born 31 January 1982 in Aubervilliers), basketball player

=== Others ===
- Henri Heim de Balsac (1899–1979), zoologist and ethologist

== See also ==
- Communes of the Seine-Saint-Denis department

== Bibliography ==
- Aubervilliers under the Revolution and the Empire, Maurice Foulon and Léo Demode, Imprimeries Mont-Louis, Clermont-Ferrand, preface by Pierre Laval - Mayor of Aubervilliers, 1935 (in French)
- Eight towns to discover in Île-de-France: Plaine Commune, Jacques Grossard, Urban's guide collection, Vendredi Treize éditions, 2007, Neuilly-sur-Seine, 96 pages, ISBN 978-2-9530241-0-4, Read online (in French)
- Aubervilliers through the centuries, Vol. 1: The Origins of the Wars of Religion, Société de l’Histoire et de la Vie à Aubervilliers, Jacques Dessain, 1988, Aubervilliers, 96 pages (in French)
- Aubervilliers through the centuries, Vol. 2: From the Wars of Religion to the Fronde, Société de l’Histoire et de la Vie à Aubervilliers, Jacques Dessain, 1991, Aubervilliers, 112 pages (in French)
- Aubervilliers through the centuries, Vol. 3: Under the reign of Louis XIV - 1653–1715, Louisette and Jacques Dessain, Jacques Dessain, 1993, Aubervilliers, 111 pages, (in French)
- Aubervilliers through the centuries, Vol. 4: A century of upheaval - 1715–1815 (Part 1): From Monarchy to Republic 1715–1794, Louisette and Jacques Dessain, Jacques Dessain, 1998, Aubervilliers, 317 pages (in French)
- Aubervilliers through the centuries, Vol. 5: A century of upheaval - 1715–1815 (Part 2): The Power of Owners 1794–1815, Jacques Dessain, Louisette and Jacques Dessain, 2002, Aubervilliers, 189 pages (in French)
- Chronicles of Aubervilliers: 1815–1848 / The village grows, Jacques Dessain, Louisette and Jacques Dessain / Les Ateliers de Saint-Denis, 2005, Saint-Denis, 80 pages (in French)
- Fortunes and Misfortunes of the Priests of Aubervilliers, Jacques Dessain, Louisette and Jacques Dessain, DL 2007 93-Saint-Denis, CAT Vivre autrement à Saint-Denis, 2008, Saint-Denis, 46 pages (in French)
- Aubervilliers / Roman, Léon Bonneff, preface by Henry Poulaille, Société de l’Histoire et de la Vie à Aubervilliers/Le Vent du ch'min, 1949 (1st edition, L'Amitié par le Livre), Saint-Denis, 291 pages (in French)
- Aubervilliers, our village / a "retro" walk in Aubervilliers or The time when our parents were small, Société de l’Histoire et de la Vie à Aubervilliers, Société de l’Histoire et de la Vie à Aubervilliers, 1985, Aubervilliers, 109 pages (in French)
- History of the Streets of Aubervilliers, Jacques Dessain, Claude Fath, and Jean-Jacques Karman, Journal d'Aubervilliers, 1984 to 1987, 3 volumes, Aubervilliers, 288 pages (in French)
- Jacques Dessain, The Oratorisns in Aubervilliers (1618–1792), Paris and Île-de-France. Memoirs published by the Fédération des sociétés historiques et archéologiques de Paris et de l'Ile-de-France, 1997, No. 48, p. 257-269 (in French)
- Anne Lombard-Jourdain, The Plaine Saint-Denis: 2000 years of history, Paris, 1994, C.N.R.S. Éditions, 212 p. (in French)
