= Notre-Dame-des-Vertus Chapel =

Catholic chapel in Sarthe, France

Notre-Dame des Vertus Chapel
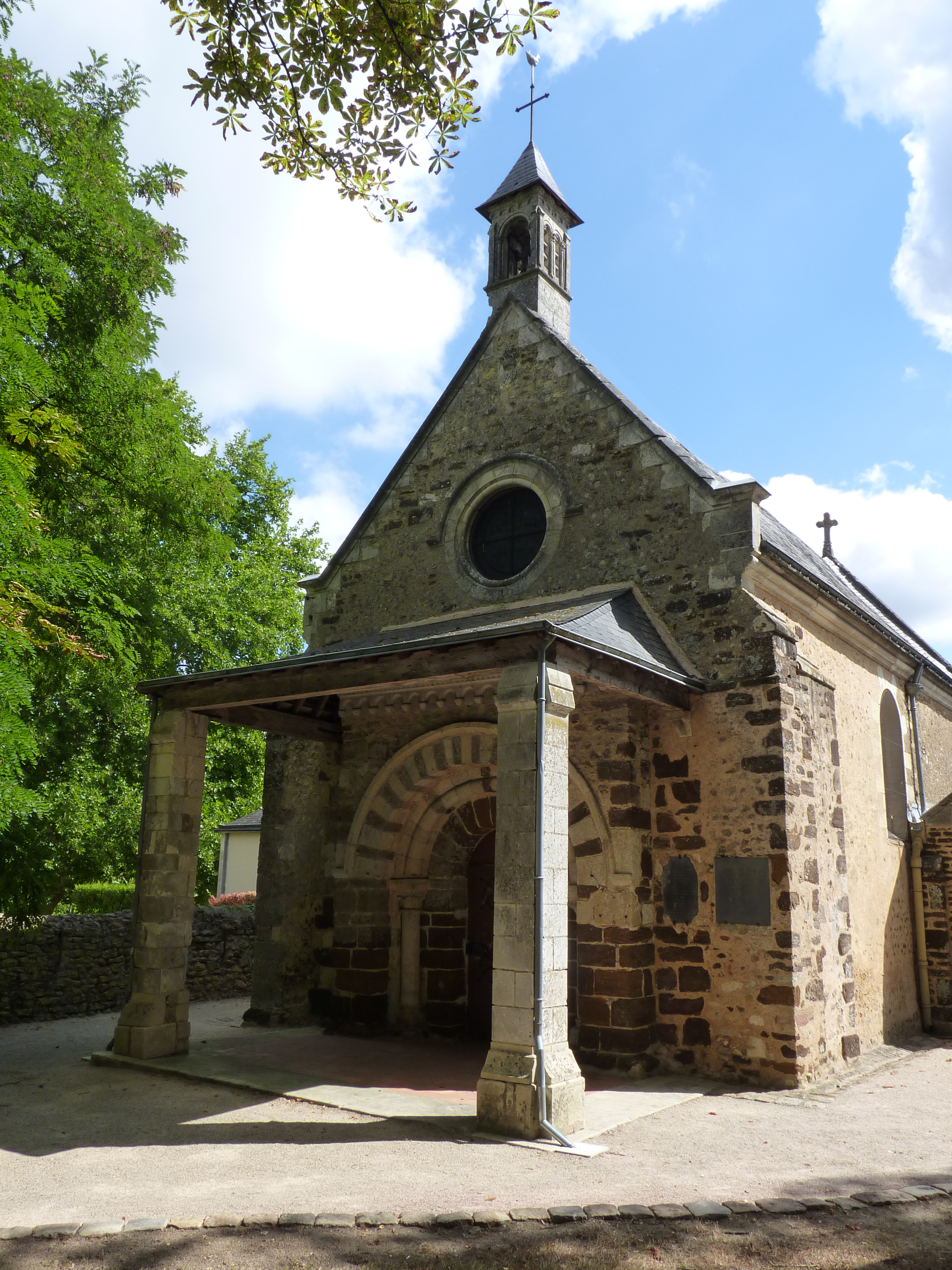
- Notre-Dame des Vertus chapel in La Flèche

- Location on a map of France

Religion
- Affiliation: Catholicism
- District: La Flèche
- Region: Pays de la Loire
- Year consecrated: 17th century (redesigned)

Location
- Location: Pays de la Loire
- Country: France
- Interactive map of Notre-Dame des Vertus Chapel
- Coordinates: 47°41′59″N 0°05′12″W

Architecture
- Completed: 17th century (redesigned)

The Notre-Dame des Vertus chapel is a Catholic religious building in the town of La Flèche, Sarthe. Built in Gallo-Roman times (at the crossroads of the Roman roads from Le Mans to Angers, and from Tours to Laval), it was rebuilt in the 11th and 12th centuries under the patronage of Saint Ouen. It was restored in the 17th century by the Jesuits of the La Flèche College, and dedicated to Notre-Dame-des-Vertus.

It has been listed as a historic monument since January 18, 1934.

== Location ==
The Notre-Dame-des-Vertus chapel is located to the north-west of the town of La Flèche, near the Saint-Thomas cemetery and Avenue Rhin-et-Danube.

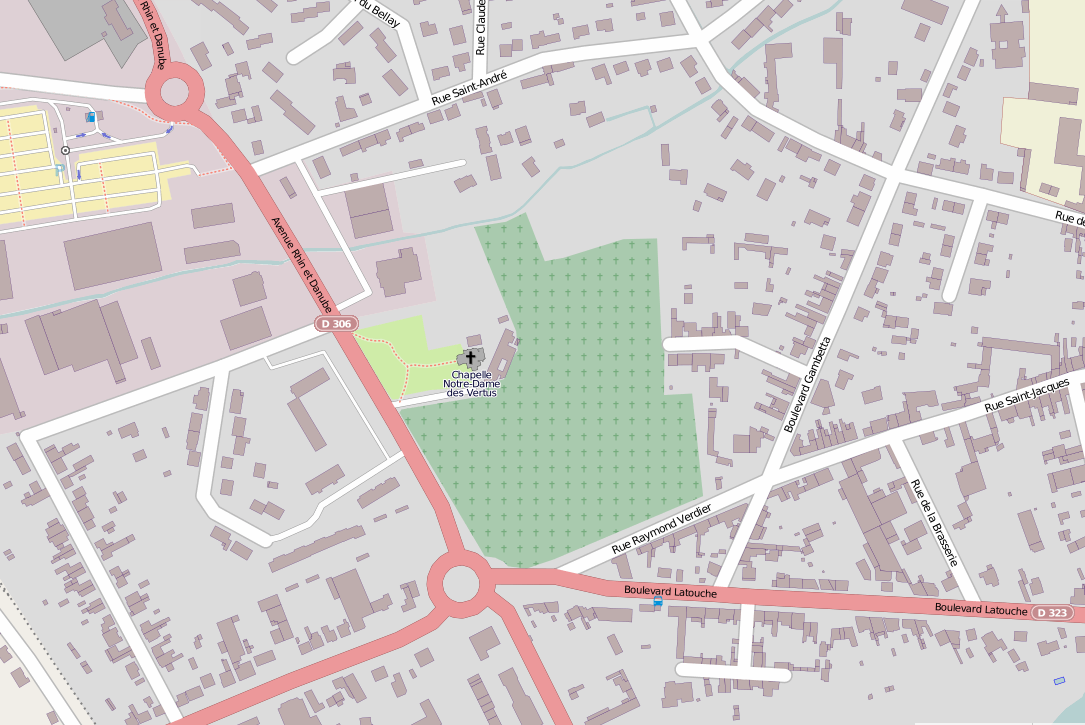
Map of the area around Notre-Dame-des-Vertus chapel.

== History ==
=== Fléchois' first sanctuary ===
The presence of a place of worship on the site of the Notre-Dame-des-Vertus chapel is attested as early as the end of Antiquity, with the first traces of occupation of La Flèche. At that time, a Gallo-Roman villa gradually gave rise to a village on the site of today's Saint-Jacques district. The sanctuary that developed was soon dedicated to Saint Ouen, and became the town's first parish.

In the second half of the 11th century, Jean de Beaugency, the first lord of La Flèche, established a fortress on the Loir, on the site of today's Carmes Castle, gradually shifting the population and its activities to this new center. His son Élie de la Flèche, Count of Maine, contributed to the town's development, notably by founding the church and priory of Saint-Thomas in 1109. Despite its out-of-the-way location, Saint-Ouen church was not abandoned: in 1087, Jean de Beaugency donated it to the monks of Saint-Aubin Abbey in Angers. The building was completely rebuilt at the turn of the 11th and 12th centuries: the Romanesque portal with voussoirs dates from this period.

Remodeled in the 14th century, the church changed its name: now dedicated to Saint Barthélemy, it became dependent on the priory of Saint-Thomas and lost its status as a parish church.

=== Modern period, Revolution, and 19th century ===
In the mid-17th century, the chapel fell into disrepair. The Jesuits of the Collège Royal de La Flèche obtained permission from the parish of the church and priory of Saint Thomas to restore it as a place of pilgrimage for their students. Financially supported by King Louis XIII, they undertook a major campaign of work between 1644 and 1674. The walls of the nave, with the exception of the western façade, were raised, while two side chapels and a sacristy were built. Once the work was completed, the building underwent another name change: in homage to the king and his devotion to the church of Notre-Dame-des-Vertus in Aubervilliers, the Fléchoise chapel was also placed under the patronage of Notre-Dame des Vertus. It became the headquarters of a Marian congregation.

During the 17th and 18th centuries, under the impetus of the Jesuits, the chapel was endowed with a rich collection of statues and paintings, as well as numerous items of furniture.

The building was put up for sale as national property during the French Revolution, and acquired in 1794 by a woman from La Flèche, Mme Coquiny-Desprez, who returned it to worship the following year. However, it wasn't until the mid-19th century that the chapel was handed over to the Factory council of the Saint-Thomas parish, at the request of Abbé Gourmenault-Desplantes. Further restoration work was undertaken by Jesuit architect Stanislas Tournesac. The stained glass windows in the choir and chapels were created by Antoine Lusson, a master glassworker from Mance, in 1848. The diaphragm arch separating the nave and choir was rebuilt, supported by columns taken from an altarpiece in Saint Thomas Church.

In 1944, during World War II, the chapel's stained glass windows were blown out by Allied bombing raids. Shortly after the Liberation, the Fléchois town council financed their restoration. Further work was carried out between 1965 and 1967 to consolidate the small bell tower above the apse and restore the panelled vault.

In 1993, the tomb of Jérôme Le Royer de La Dauversière's last descendants, the Royer de la Motte family, buried in the Crosmières cemetery, was transferred to the small cemetery in front of the entrance to the Notre-Dame-des-Vertus chapel.

== Description ==
=== Architecture ===
The Notre-Dame-des-Vertus chapel is built to a fairly simple plan: it consists of a single nave, flanked by two side chapels, and a choir with a flat three-sided apse. The nave and choir are separated by a diaphragm arch.

The access on the west side is through a 12th-century Romanesque portal with voussoirs, built of white limestone and roussard sandstone rubble. It is protected by a canopy added to the west façade in the mid-17th century. During this period, the nave walls were raised and the two side chapels were added, as well as a sacristy to the northeast of the building.

=== Decor and furniture ===
==== Statues, paintings, and painted decor in the vaulted ceiling ====
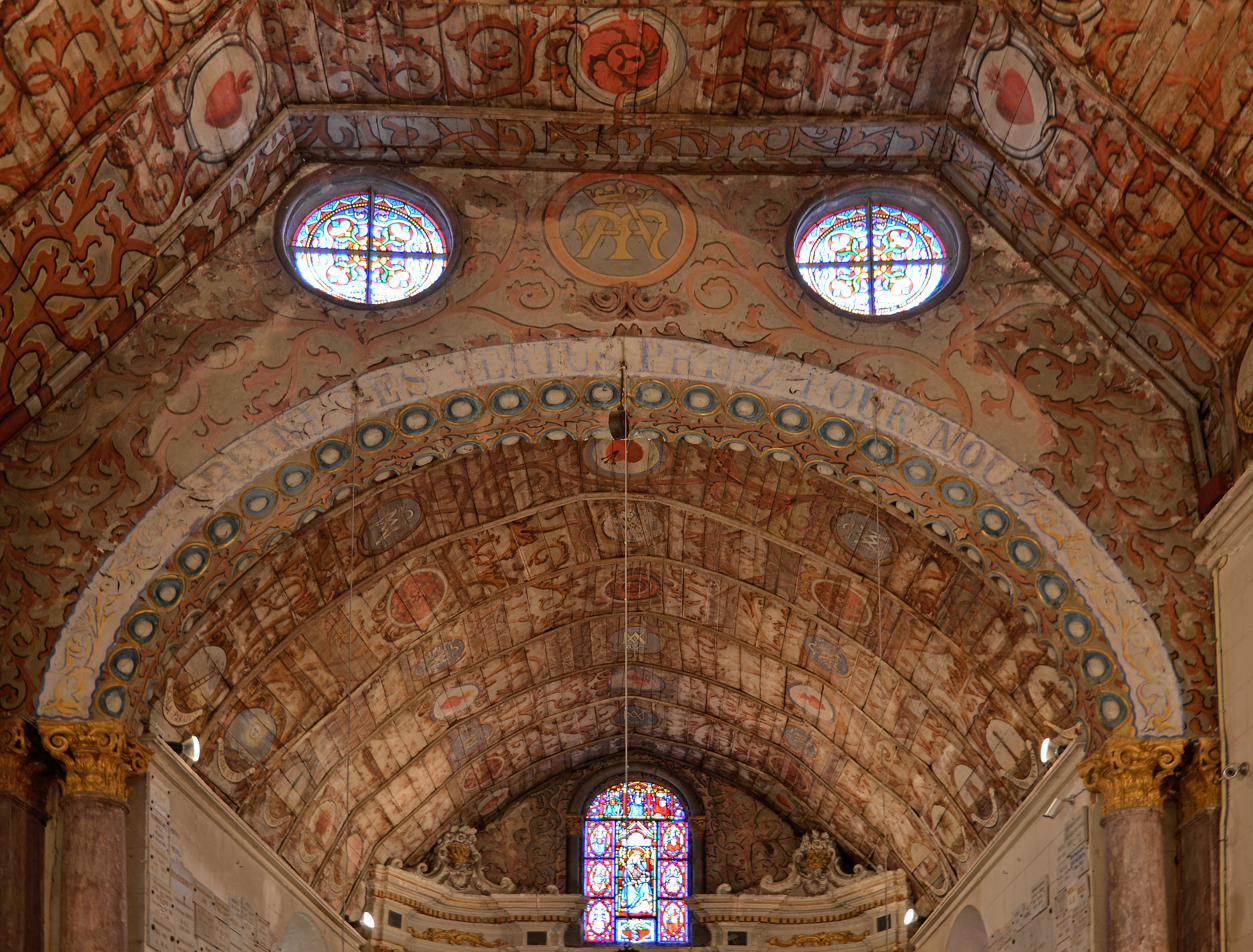
Overview Four medallions The painted decoration of the vault

The main decorative elements of the Notre-Dame-des-Vertus chapel date from the second half of the 17th century, when restoration work was undertaken by the Jesuits of the Collège Royal de La Flèche. The choice of works exhibited by the Jesuits was essentially educational, in the context of the Counter-Reformation. For this reason, representations of the Holy Family are omnipresent. This is the case with a 17th-century terracotta statue of Mary and a sculpted group depicting the Education of the Virgin, located on either side of the diaphragm arch, as well as a statue of Joseph and the infant Jesus, opposite the pulpit.

The walls of the nave hold a collection of paintings from the 17th and 18th centuries. On the south wall is an oil painting depicting the Education of the Virgin, painted around 1670 by Pierre Besnard I, a native of Malicorne, and an 18th-century portrait of Saint Augustine. On the north wall, an anonymous early 17th-century painting depicts the Annunciation, alongside an 18th-century depiction of the Lamentation of Christ. Finally, a painting showing Jesus in the Garden of Olives adorns the walls of the north chapel.

The ceilings of the nave and choir are covered with a paneled vault, on which are painted hearts and plant motifs, as well as litanies to the glory of the Virgin Mary, inscribed in circular medallions. In the center is the monogram of Jesus, IHS, as well as the abbreviated Latin dedication to Mary in a blue medallion. One of the medallions depicts the “City of Refuge” (Civitas Refugii), apparently inspired by a view of La Flèche in 1644.

==== Furniture ====
In the choir, the retable, set against the flat chevet, is made of tuffeau stone. It features four pilasters in black Solesmes marble, with capitals covered in gold leaf. A terracotta statue of the Virgin and Child, originally from the Collège de La Flèche, is enthroned in the center. It was transferred to this chapel in 1762, when the Jesuits were evicted, to replace a wooden statue of Notre-Dame-des-Vertus. It is framed in the side niches by stone statues of two holy members of the Society of Jesus, Louis de Gonzague and Stanislas Kostka.

The 17th-century wooden pulpit features finely carved decoration, notably the vat, punctuated by cascades of fruits, and the twisted columns supporting the sounding board. It comes from the chapel of the priory set up by the Order of Fontevraud in La Flèche, and donated by the Mother Superior to Notre-Dame-des-Vertus.

In 1848, carved Renaissance-style panelling was installed on the nave and choir walls. Most came from the Verger Castle, in Seiches-sur-le-Loir, and the adjoining priory's Sainte-Croix church, both of which were dismantled before the French Revolution. These panels feature a series of medallions, notably depictions of the Blessed Sacrament. The choir features two doors, one of which, on the north wall, depicts a saint holding an open book in her hand. The low-relief of the "Muslim warrior", which decorates one of the panels of the chapel's entrance door, also comes from the Château du Verger. Created in a transitional style between Gothic and Renaissance, it dates from the late 15th century, making it the chapel's oldest decorative element.

==== Stained glass ====
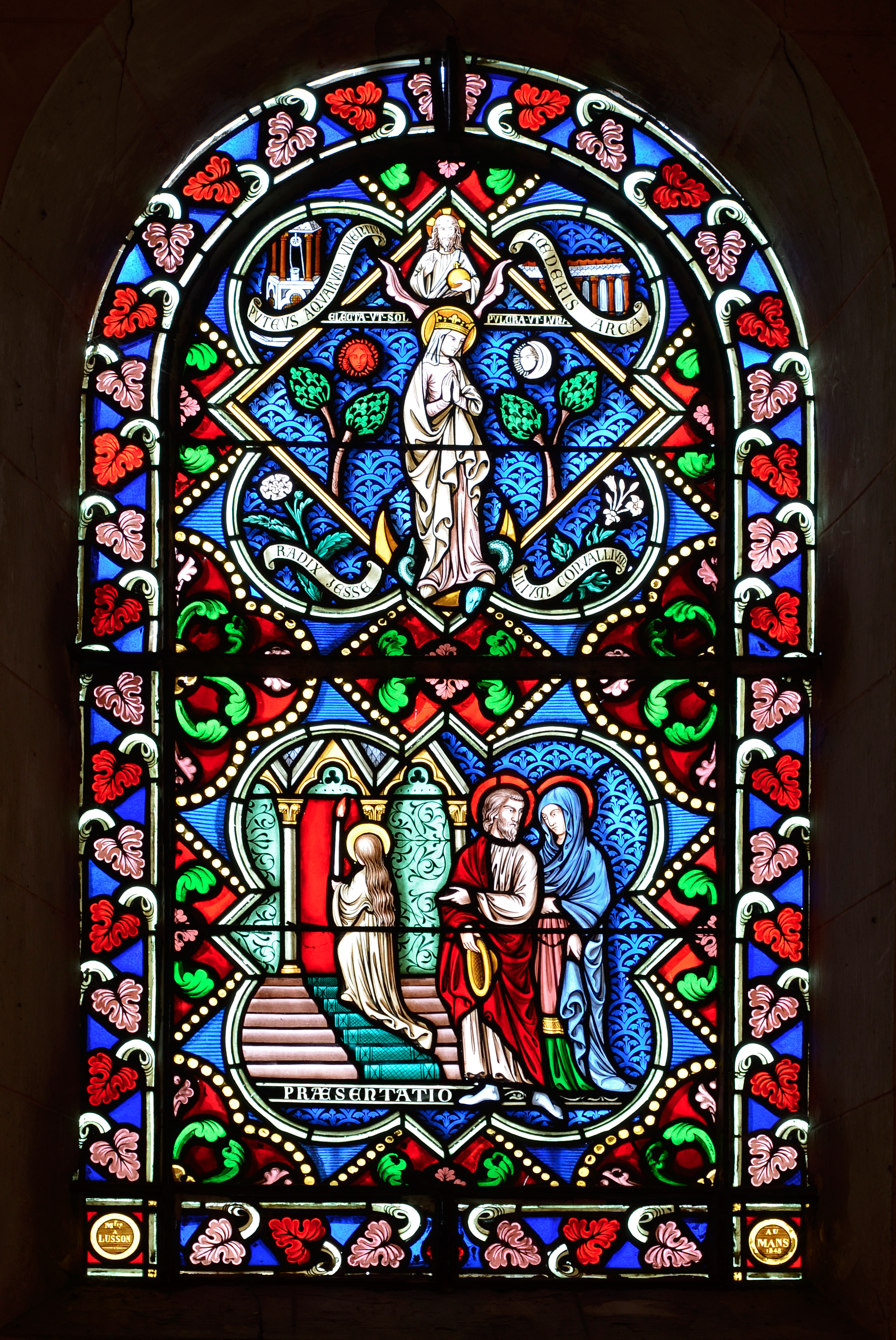
Marie's presentation.

All the stained glass windows in the choir and chapels were created by Sarthe master glassworker Antoine Lusson in 1848. The choir window, above the altarpiece, depicts the four cardinal virtues (prudence, temperance, fortitude, and justice) and the three theological virtues (faith, hope, and charity). The stained glass window in the south chapel depicts the Presentation of Mary in the Temple, while the one in the north chapel shows a Pietà.

==== Conservations ====
The Notre-Dame-des-Vertus chapel has been listed as a historic monument since January 18, 1934. The woodwork, including the 15th-century “Muslim warrior” door, was listed as historical monument on December 29, 1906. Since then, other objects in the chapel have been classified or listed:

- The Annunciation and Jesus in the Garden of Olives, paintings from the 17th and 18th centuries, listed since February 14, 1989
- La Déploration du Christ and Saint-Augustin, 19th-century paintings, L'éducation de la Vierge and Saint-Joseph et l'Enfant, terracotta sculptures from the 17th and 18th centuries, the altarpiece of the high altar (18th century) and a set of three 18th-century wooden stools, listed since June 8, 1989
- Vierge, 18th-century terracotta statue, listed since January 10, 1991
- L'éducation de la Vierge and La guérison de la fille de Jaïre, paintings from the 17th and 18th centuries, Vierge à l'Enfant, painted and gilded stone statue, and a wooden confessional, both from the 18th century, listed since July 1, 1994.

== Gallery ==
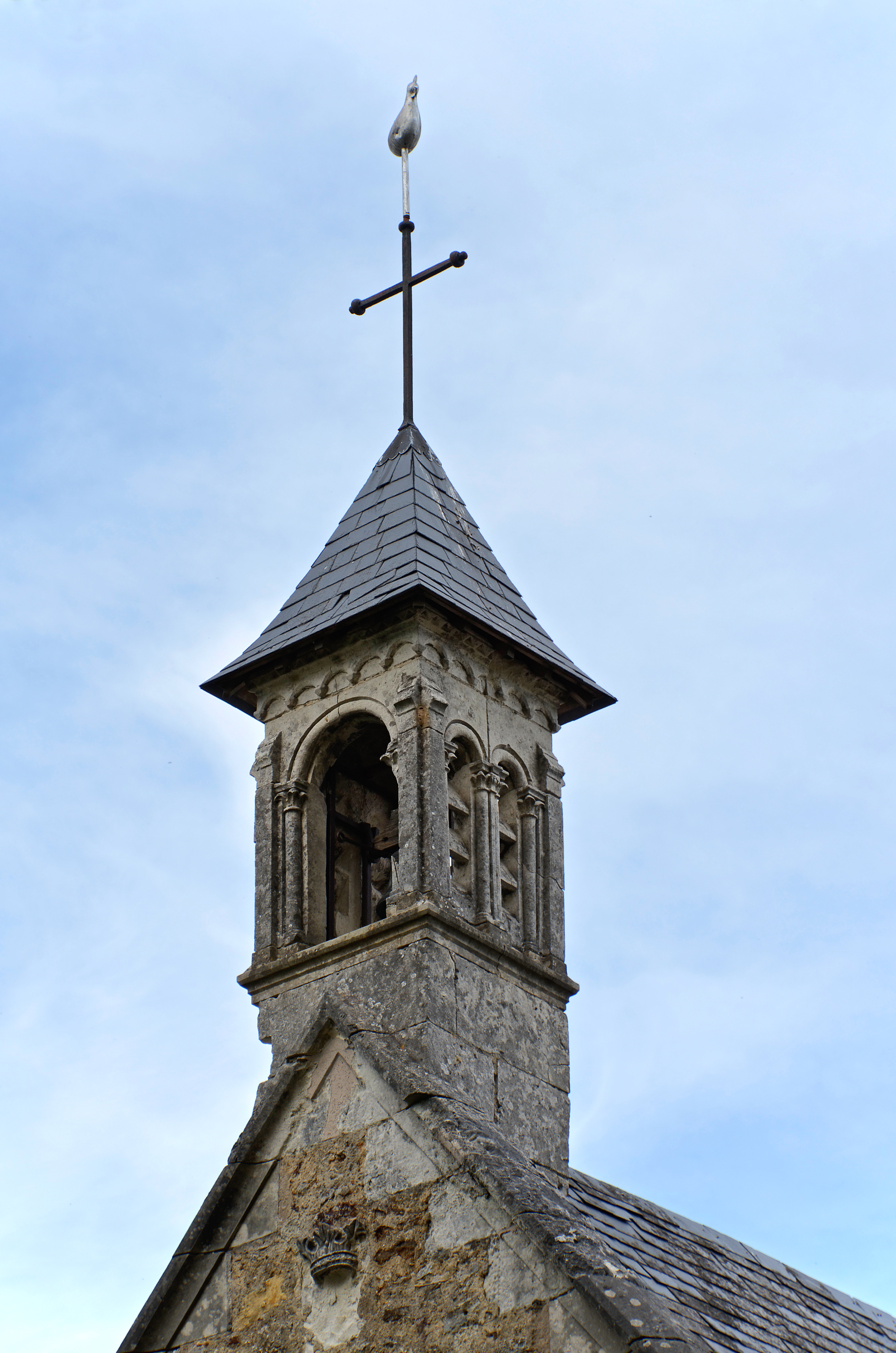
Bell tower detail

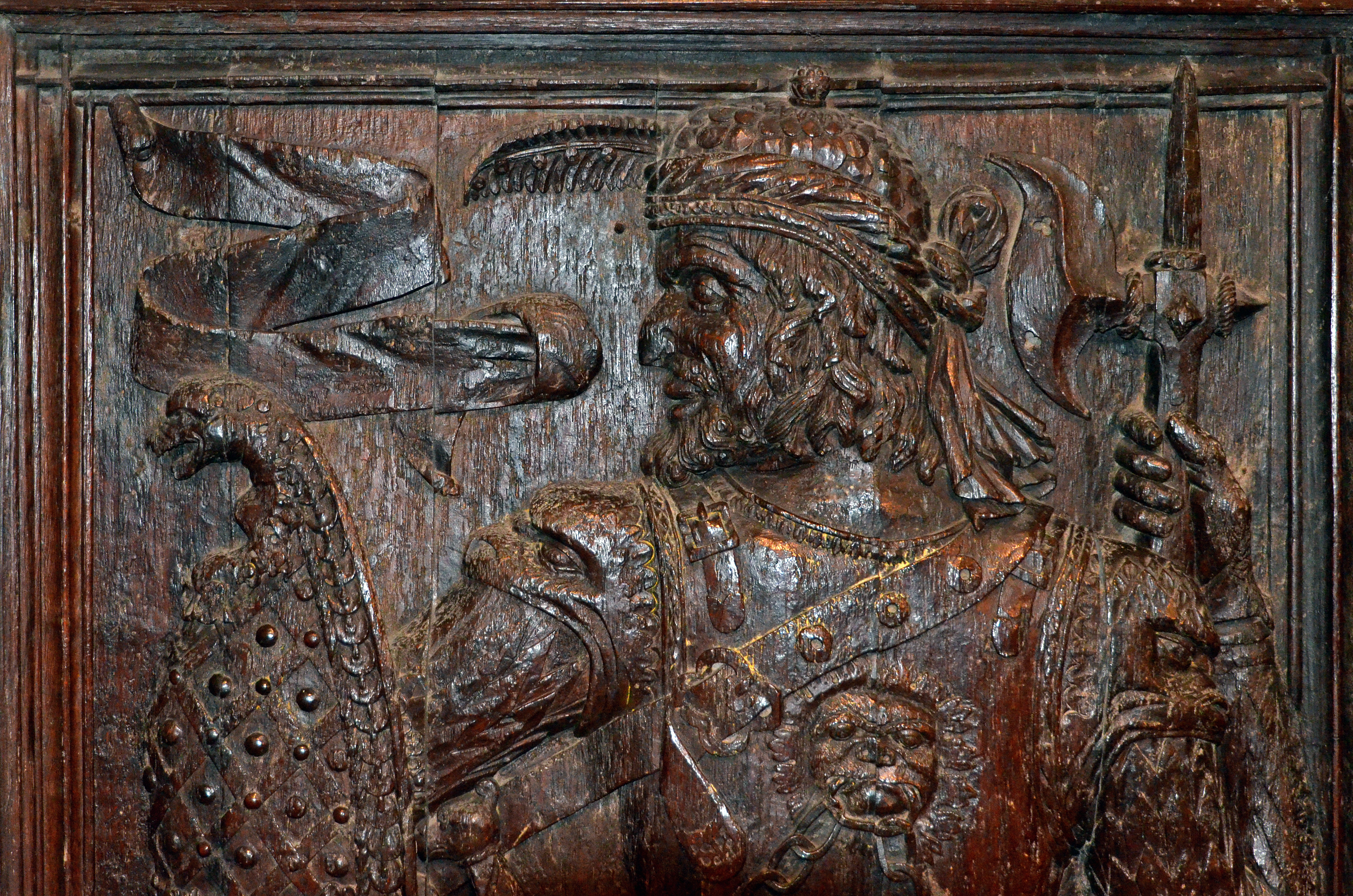
The “Muslim warrior” door

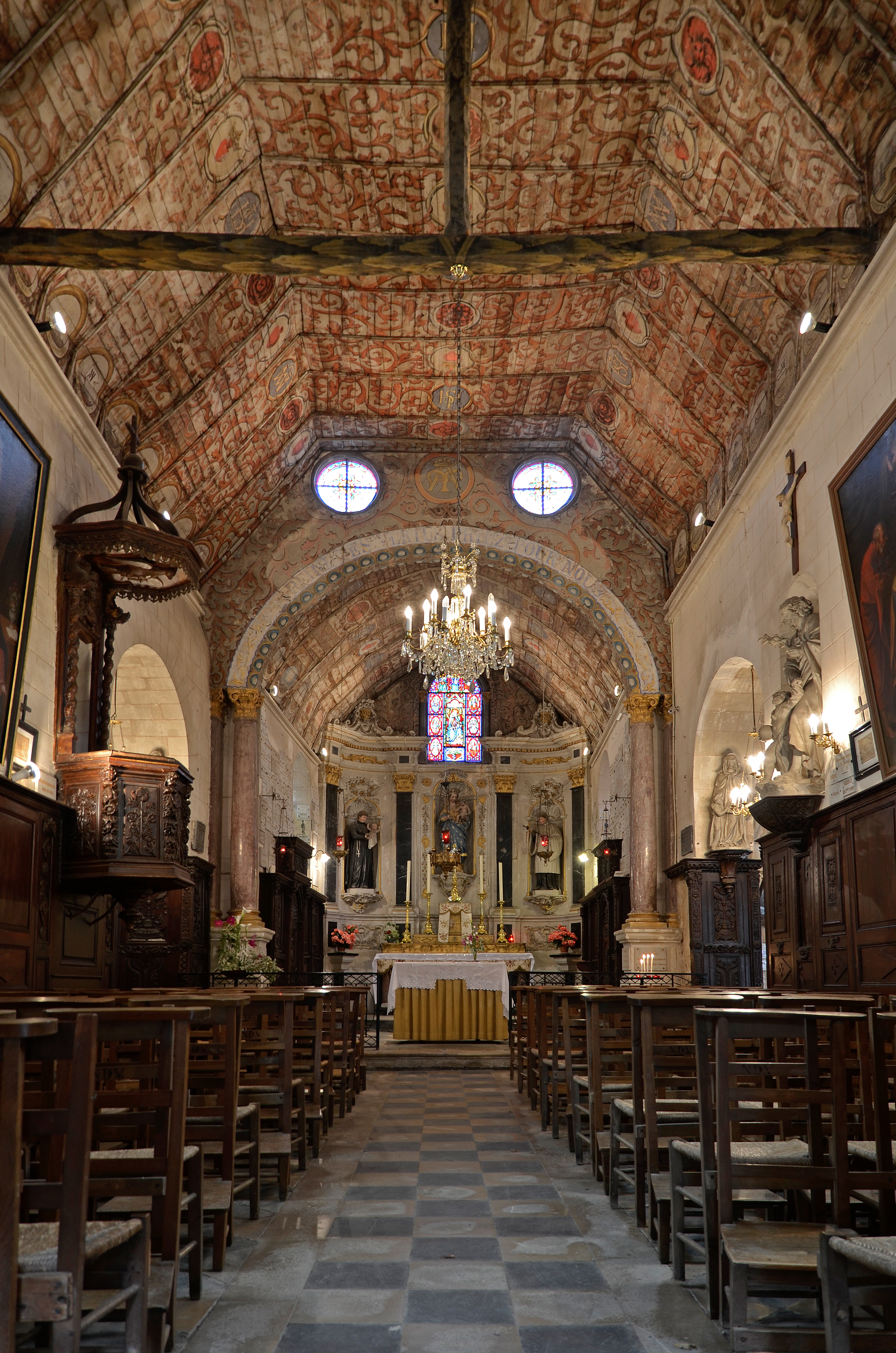
Inside view

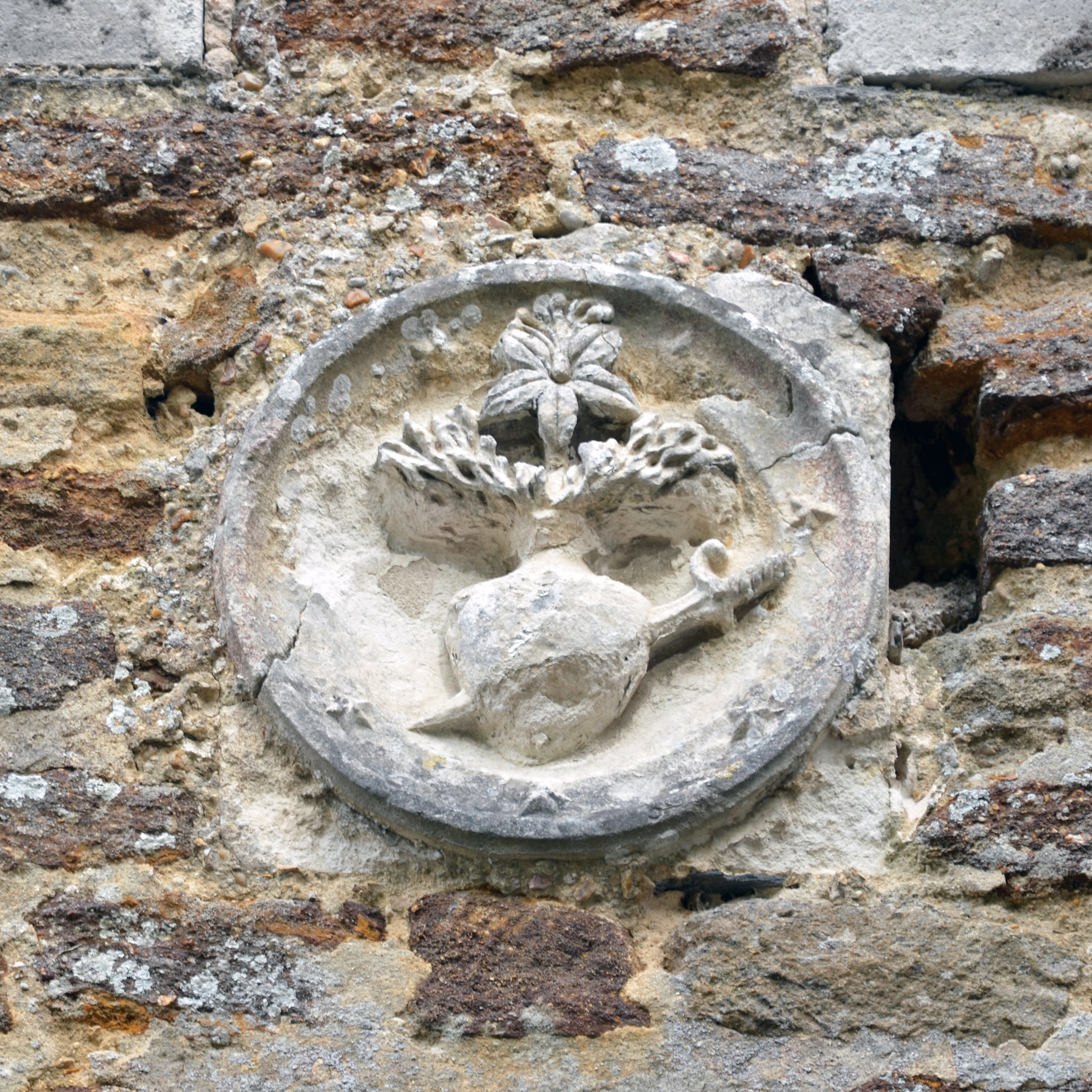
Outdoor décor

== See also ==
- La Flèche
- List of historical monuments in Sarthe
