= Etiyé Dimma Poulsen =

Danish sculptor (born 1968)

- Born: 1968 (age 57–58); Ethiopia
- Occupation: Sculptor

Etiyé Dimma Poulsen (born 1968) is an Ethiopian-born Danish sculptor, known for her work in ceramics.

== Biography ==
Poulsen, who has exhibited widely in Europe, Africa and North America, lives and works in Antwerp, Belgium. Her work is held in numerous museums, including in the collection of the National Museum of African Art in Washington, DC. Born in Ethiopia, she moved at the age of six to Tanzania and then to Kenya with her adoptive parents. They were Danes, and moved the family to Denmark when she was fourteen. There she studied art history in college and taught art in various youth programs. Initially focusing on painting landscapes using oil on canvas, her interest in creating sculpture spurred her move to France at 23 and she began working with clay.

Poulsen's figurative sculptures are often slim silhouettes colored with natural pigments. Her work takes its inspiration from traditional African art and the indigenous art of Oceania, but she emphasizes that her own varied experiences across continents are all important influences. "What really seduces me is the different variations of human features," Poulsen remarks. "The more simple and sober my forms are, the more expressive they seem. If you take a close look at the sculptures, you'll be surprised to find that the expressions on the faces are actually generated merely by a cracked line that traces an eye or a wrinkle....It seems as if exactly through corrosion and fragmentation, the opposite--life--emerges."

=== Technique ===
Poulsen is most known for creating filiform ceramic sculptures. "Her technique consists of applying a thin layer of clay on an iron mesh to produce, when fired, worn-out looking ‘primitive’ figures. The cracks that occur form an eye or a wrinkle, contributing to the expressions on the faces; thus strong and delicate features are achieved simultaneously." She has employed this technique in the vast majority of her work, and reports that she is deeply connected to the transformative effect of firing. “Fire is a creative element which models my sculptures all in their giving life,” Poulsen says.

== Work ==
Since 1990, Poulsen has been featured in individual exhibitions in Denmark, France, the US, Côte d'Ivoire, Cameroon and Switzerland. Beginning in 1992, she began to participate in group shows in Spain, Palma de Mallorca, Belgium, United States, and France. Her work was included in the Smithsonian National Museum of African Art 2003 exhibition Ethiopian Passages: Dialogues in the Diaspora.

=== Solo exhibitions ===
- 2010: Galerie d'Haudrecy Knockke, Galerie Claudine, Legrand Paris
- 2009: Galerie Geneviève Godard Lille, Willem Elias Woluwe Belgium, Galerie Strenger Tokyo Japan, Centre d'Art André Malraux Colmar
- 2008: Galerie Strenger, Tokyo, Japan, Joie Lassiter Gallery Charlotte U.S.A, Papirfabrikken Silkeborg Denmark, Parlement Européen, Charteaux d'Hardelay Les Herbiers, Womanhood Hood Museum New Hampshire, Worldbank Washington U.S.A
- 2007: UNESCO Paris, Kolonienpaleis Tervuren Belgium, Musée Maurice Denis, Paris, D'Haudrecy Art Gallery Knokke Zoute Belgium, Wertz Contemporary Gallery, Atlanta Georgia, Galerie Claudine Legrand Paris, Galerie Elfie Bohrer Banstetten, Zurich, Switzerland
- 2006: Skoto Gallery, New York, Galerie Capazza, Nancay, France, Centre Culturel Scharpoord Knokke, Belgium, Galerie des Emibois, Switzerland
- 2005: Galerie Claudine Legrand, Paris, Wertz contemporary Gallery Atlanta, USA, Gallery Knud Grothe Charlottenlund, Denmark, Gallery Marc Van Meensel, Holland Art Fair Den Haag, Galerie Hamlin Honfleur, France, Galerie Claudine Legrand, Paris, Lineart Gent, Belgium, Galerie 23 Amsterdam
- 2003: St’art 2003, Strasbourg, Gallery Knud Grothe Charlottenlund, Denmark, Smithsonian Museum of African Art, Washington, Galerie des Emibois, Switzerland, Galerie Hamelin Honfleur, France, Gallery MAM, Douala, Cameroon, MOBA Gallery, Belgium
- 2002: Alliance Française, Ethiopia, Galerie Claudine Legrand, Paris
- 2001: Gallery MAM, Douala, Cameroon, St’art 2001, Strasbourg, October Gallery, London, Château des Carmes, La Flèche, France
- 2000: Biennale Dakar, Hamelin Gallery, Honfleur, Galerie Capazza, Nancy, France, Galerie Claudine Legrand, Paris
- 1999: Galerie Geneviève Godar, Lille, Galerie des Emibois, Switzerland, Maison de la Céramique, Mulhouse
- 1998: Arts Pluriels, Abidjan, Ivory Coast, MAM, Douala, Cameroon, Galerie Claudine Legrand, Paris
- 1997: Bomani Gallery, San Francisco, Afrique en Création, Ministry of Cooperation, Centre Wallonie, Brussels, Galerie Claudine Legrand, Paris
- 1996: Centre Culturel, Meudon, Paris, Galerie Hamelin, Honfleur, Galerie Geneviève Godar, Lille
- 1994: Centre Culturel La Nacelle, Aubergenville, France
- 1989: Industrial Space Dong, Copenhagen, Denmark
- 2004: Museum of World Culture, Göteborg, Sweden, Lille Art Fair, Galerie Hamlin, Galerie Geneviève Godar, Lille, Galerie Claudine Legrand, Paris, St’art 2004, Galerie Hamlin, Strasbourg

=== Joint exhibitions ===
2010: Beddington Fine Art Bargemon, Joint Exhibition with Christian Destieu 21 August - 16 October 2010, Group Sculpture Beddington Fine Art 10th Anniversary Exhibition Gallery Garden Bargemon from the 26th of June 2010, Galerie Elfie Bohrer Zurich

2007: Terre Noire "Ousmane Sow et les tendances de la sculpture africaine d'aujourd'hui", Musée Départemental Maurice Denis, St- Germain- en Laye

2006: Les 4 Saisons, L'Hiver Inge Horup & Etiyé Dimma Poulsen Beddington Fine Art Bargemon

2003: Ethiopian Passages: Dialogues in the Diaspora, Smithsonian National Museum of African Art, Washington, DC

=== Museum collections ===
The Herbert F. Johnson Museum of Art, Ithaca, New York; The Hans Bogatzke Collection of Contemporary African Art, Germany; The Smithsonian National Museum of African Art, Washington, DC; Newark Museum, Newark, New Jersey; Hood Museum, Hanover, New Hampshire; La Piscine, Roubaix, France
