= Carmes Castle =

Castle in Sarthe, France

- Château des Carmes (French)
- France
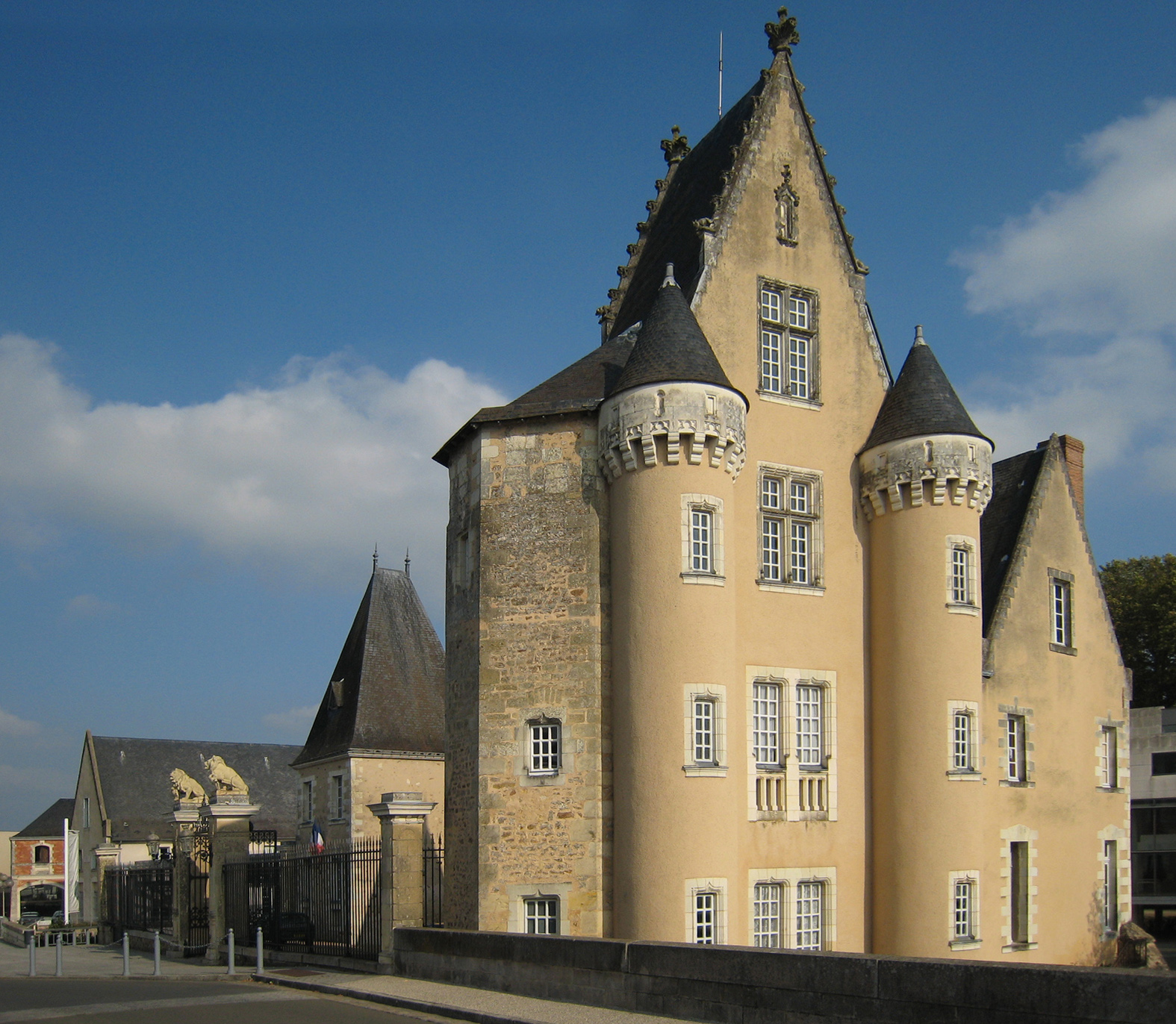
- Town of La Flèche in the county of Sarthe/France; the former Château des Carmes was transformed and became Townhall in 1994.

Site information
- Type: Castle
- Operator: Public property

Location
- Coordinates: 47°41′45″N 0°04′29″W

Site history
- Built by: Jean de Beaugency
- Materials: Limestone; sandstone; flint; mixed units; rubble stone; rubble stone without ashlar chain; coating

Carmes Castle is a building located in La Flèche in the Sarthe department. Established as a fortress in the mid-11th century, it was transformed by the Carmelites in the 17th century, who set up their convent there, and then became a private dwelling after the Revolution. The oldest building in the commune, it was converted into the town hall in the early 20th century.

== History ==
=== The medieval fortress ===
The construction of the original fortress dates back to the 11th century. Around 1050, Jean de Beaugency, Lord of La Flèche, was looking for a site to build his castle. He chose to build it on an island in the Loir, on the site of today's Carmes Castle. Sitting firmly in the river, the fortress was protected by three islands equipped with outposts and drawbridges. The whole complex was defended by a network of hydraulic fortifications. At the same time, Jean de Beaugency had a bridge built to divert the trade route from Blois to Angers, so that it would pass at the foot of the new fortress, forcing merchants to pay tolls to the local lord.

In 1081, Foulques-le-Réchin, Count of Anjou, laid siege to Jean de Beaugency's castle. The fortress was burnt down, then promptly rebuilt. In the 11th century, a chapel was built by Jean de Beaugency. It was named Notre-Dame-du-Chef-du-Pont, because of its location at the entrance to the bridge over the Loir. It was one of the first three parishes in La Flèche, along with Saint Thomas and Saint-Ouen churches. St. Louis, who visited La Flèche on May 15, 1230, paid his respects here, as did Thomas Becket a few years before him. Several times besieged during the Hundred Years' War, the fortress was occupied by the English until 1418.

The old fortified castle was rebuilt in the second half of the 15th century by René d'Alençon, Lord of La Flèche. Despite these improvements, however, the fortress no longer met Renaissance standards of luxury and comfort, and was soon abandoned. Françoise d'Alençon, René's daughter, built a new residence, the “castle-Neuf”, on the site of the future college.

=== From Carmelite convent to bourgeois home ===
Louis XIII stayed at the Carmes Castle in August 1620, while pursuing the army of his mother Marie de Médicis. Given the dilapidated state of the building, he decided to donate the Notre-Dame-du-Chef-du-Pont chapel to the Cistercians on October 28, 1623. In the end, the Cistercians decided not to settle in La Flèche, and the community of Carmelites, who were living in an old building near the city walls, asked the Cardinal de Richelieu, then abbot of Cîteaux, to cede the Notre-Dame chapel to them. The transfer was completed on December 1, 1640, with the Carmelite fathers also commissioned to clear the Loir of the collapsed walls obstructing the river's flow. It was at this time that the bridge over the Loir, recently rebuilt on the orders of Guillaume Fouquet de La Varenne, took on the name “Pont des Carmes”. Thanks to various bequests and revenues, the Carmelite fathers extensively transformed the old building. Keeping only the 15th-century keep, they had the medieval fortress razed to the ground to establish their monastery.

The Carmes remained owners of the castle until the French Revolution. In 1794, it was sold as national property to François Bertron, a merchant from Fougeré. The Bertron family retained the conventual buildings, except for the cloister and chapel, which were transformed into an orangery, sheds, and festival halls.

=== Town Hall ===
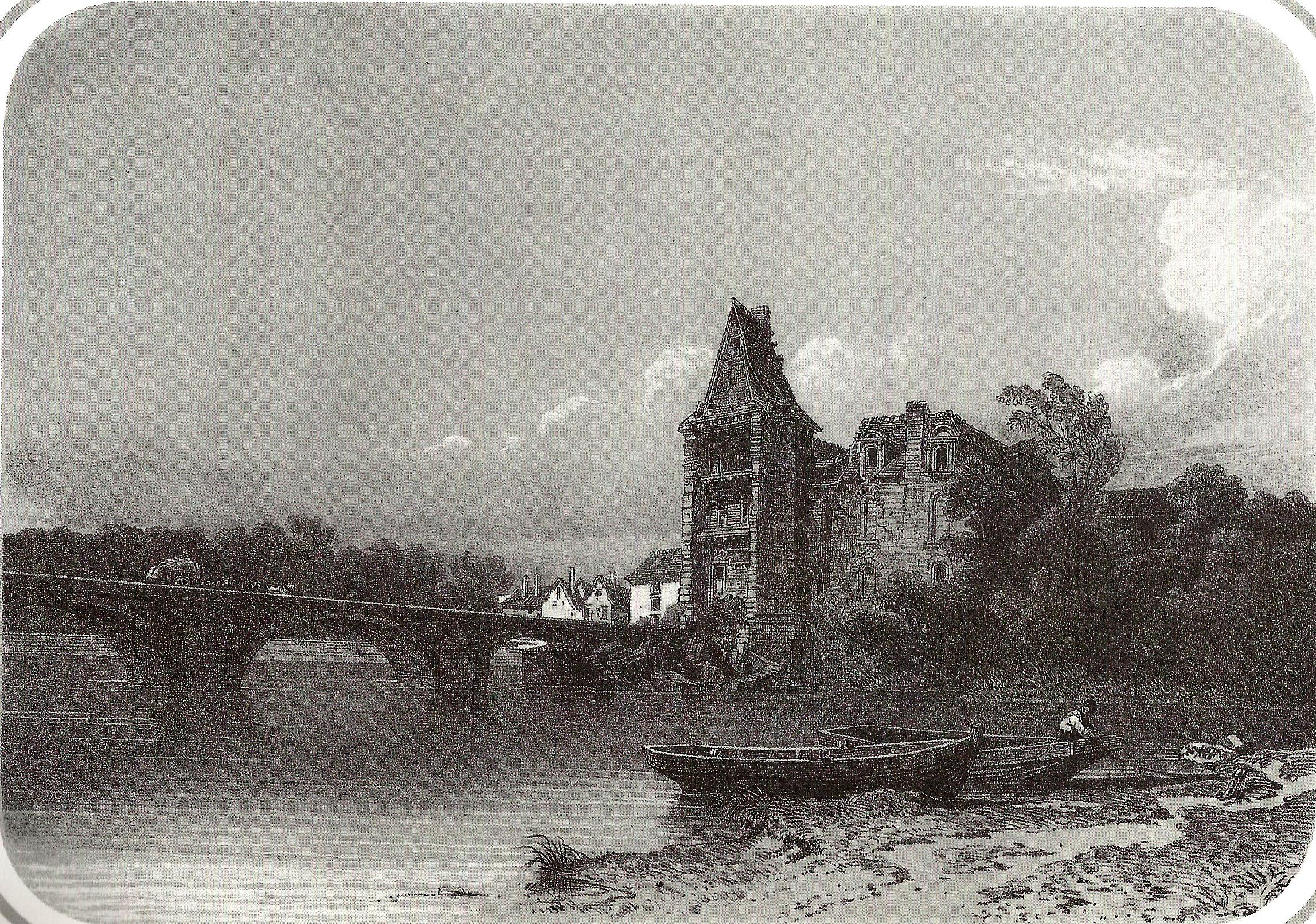
Remains of the La Flèche castle (Thomas Drake)

Shortly after the death of its owner Émile Bertron-Auger in 1906, the castle was put up for sale. A property dealer, Mr. Bardet, acquired it on September 30, 1907, with the condition that he would sell it back to the town of La Flèche if the latter so decided. While awaiting the actual acquisition of the castle, the local councillors drew up several plans for the use of the new premises, including the installation of a public girls' school, which was refused by the prefecture. The agreement to purchase the Carmes Castle from the town council was ratified by the elected representatives on March 27, 1909. It was then decided to transfer the town hall to the new premises, which until then had been located in the former Halle-au-Blé.

On March 1, 1919, the Carmes Castle fell prey to a violent fire. Only the 15th-century tower on the banks of the Loir was preserved. Due to the high cost of restoration work, the Carmes Castle remained in ruins for several years. It was then decided to partially rebuild the buildings, and on November 19, 1928, the town hall offices were relocated to the heart of the castle. The old cloister was not restored, and the former chapel was converted into a village hall.

At the end of the 20th century, an extension project for the town hall was launched under the mandate of Guy-Michel Chauveau. A modern building was added to the Carmes Castle. Designed by architects Philippe Bodinier, Roland Korenbaum, and Adrien Fainsilber, the new premises opened on May 2, 1994. Today, the Carmes Castle is used for exhibitions, weddings, receptions, and meetings.

== Architecture ==
The Carmes Castle is set in a meander on the north bank of the Loir. It occupies two islets separated by canals. Only the 15th-century tower, facing the river, remains from medieval times. It has two square storeys and an attic floor. Two neoclassical turrets were added to the façade in 1880. The main body of the dwelling, built at the time of the Carmelite fathers, is composed of one square storey and an attic storey. The former chapel is located on the northern block, separated from the rest of the buildings by a water cloister and ambulatory. The main courtyard is enclosed by a gate and monumental portal, the pillars of which are surmounted by lions. The new buildings are located at the south-east corner of the castle.

== Gallery ==
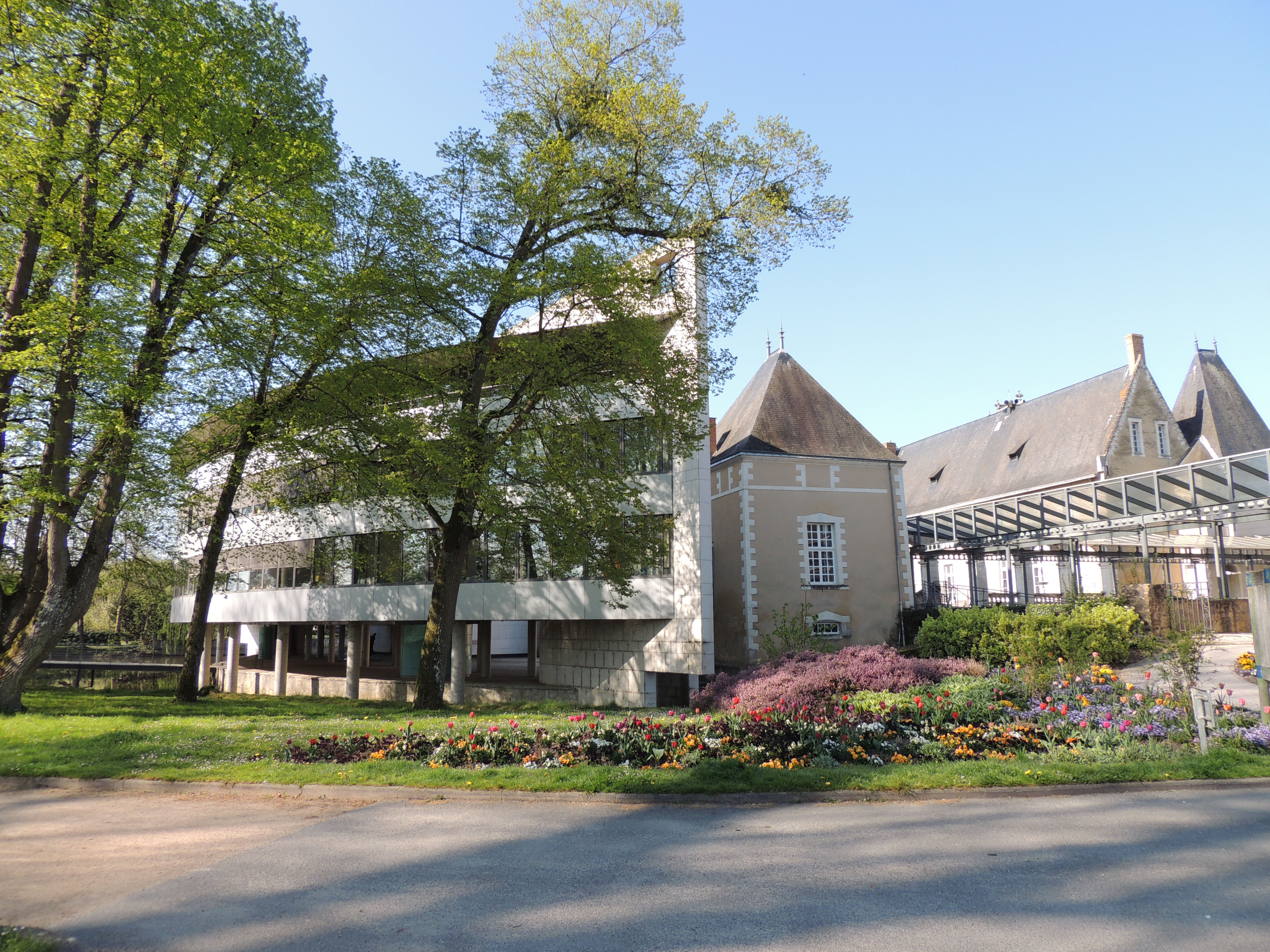
The new town hall buildings, seen from the Parc des Carmes entrance

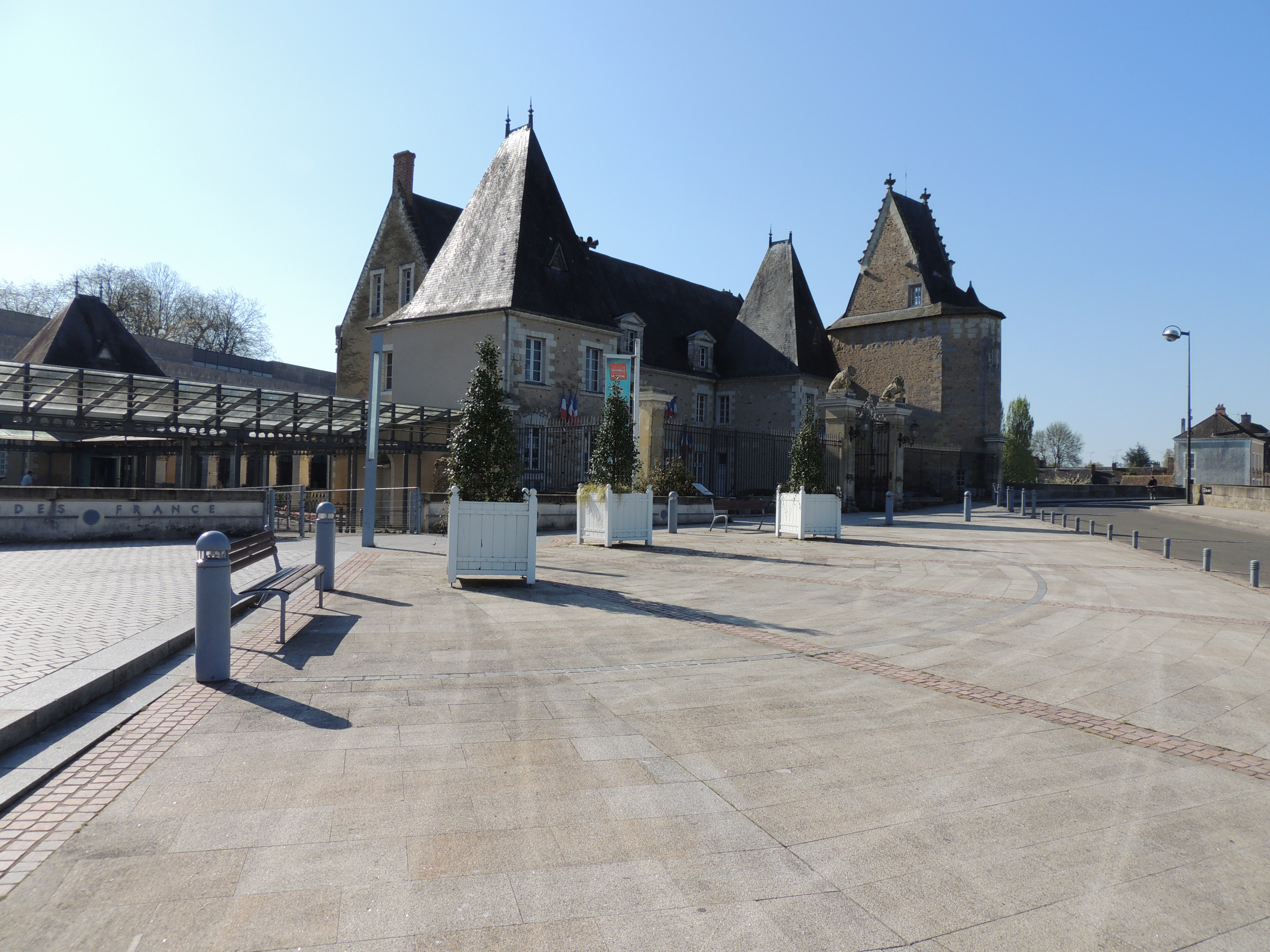
The Carmes Castle, seen from the Espace Pierre Mendès-France

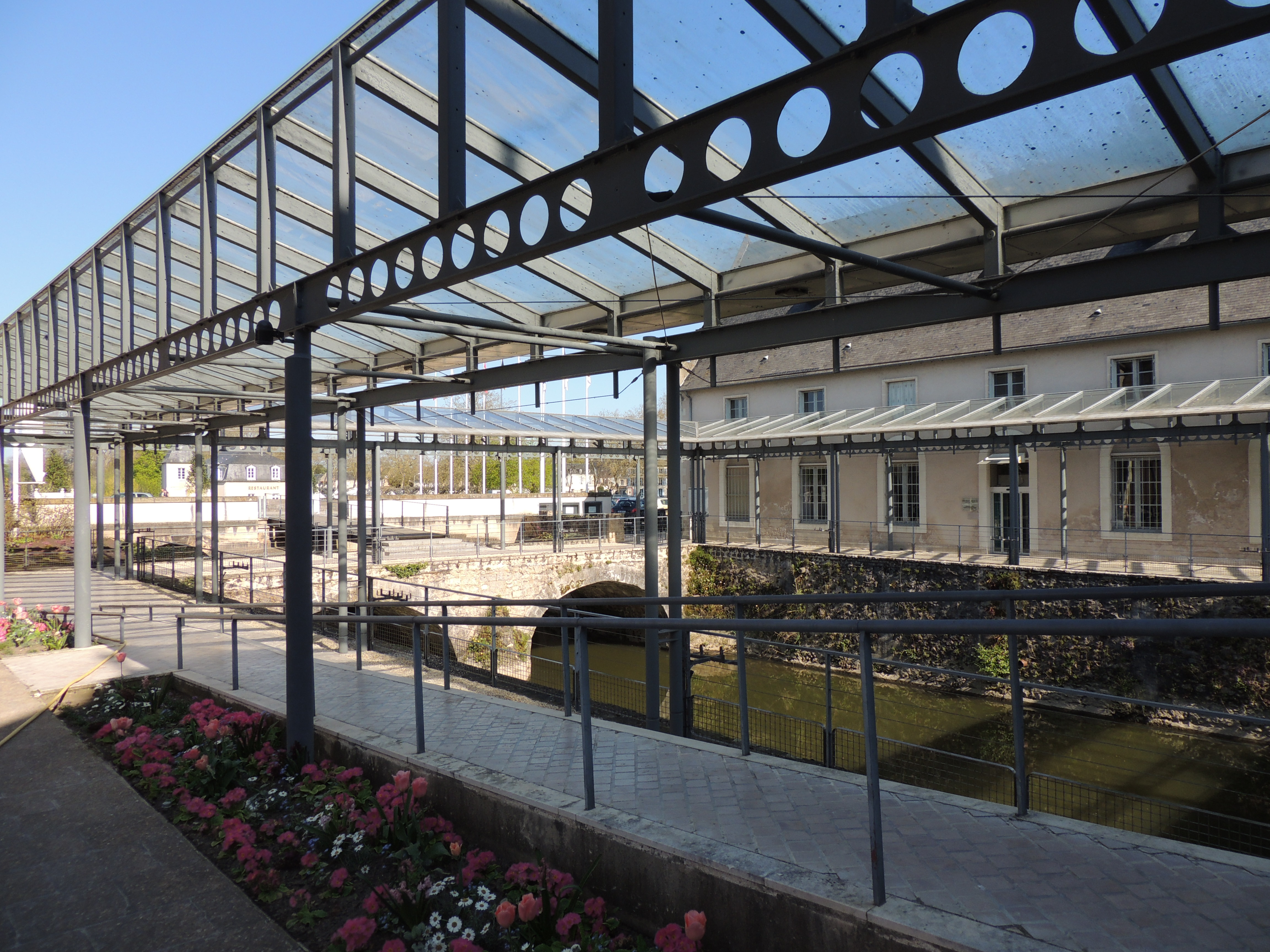
The water cloister

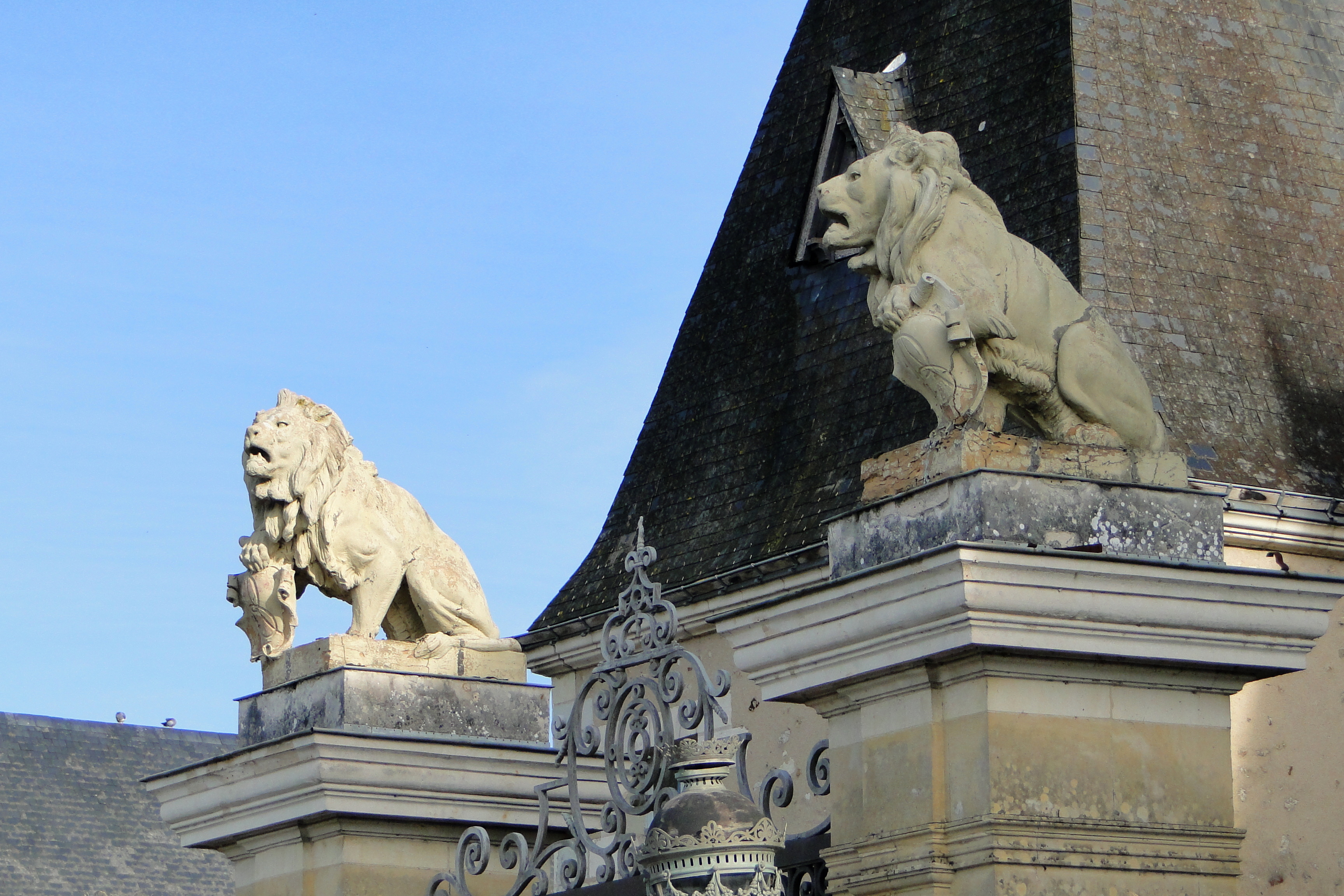
The lions surmounting the pillars of the entrance gate

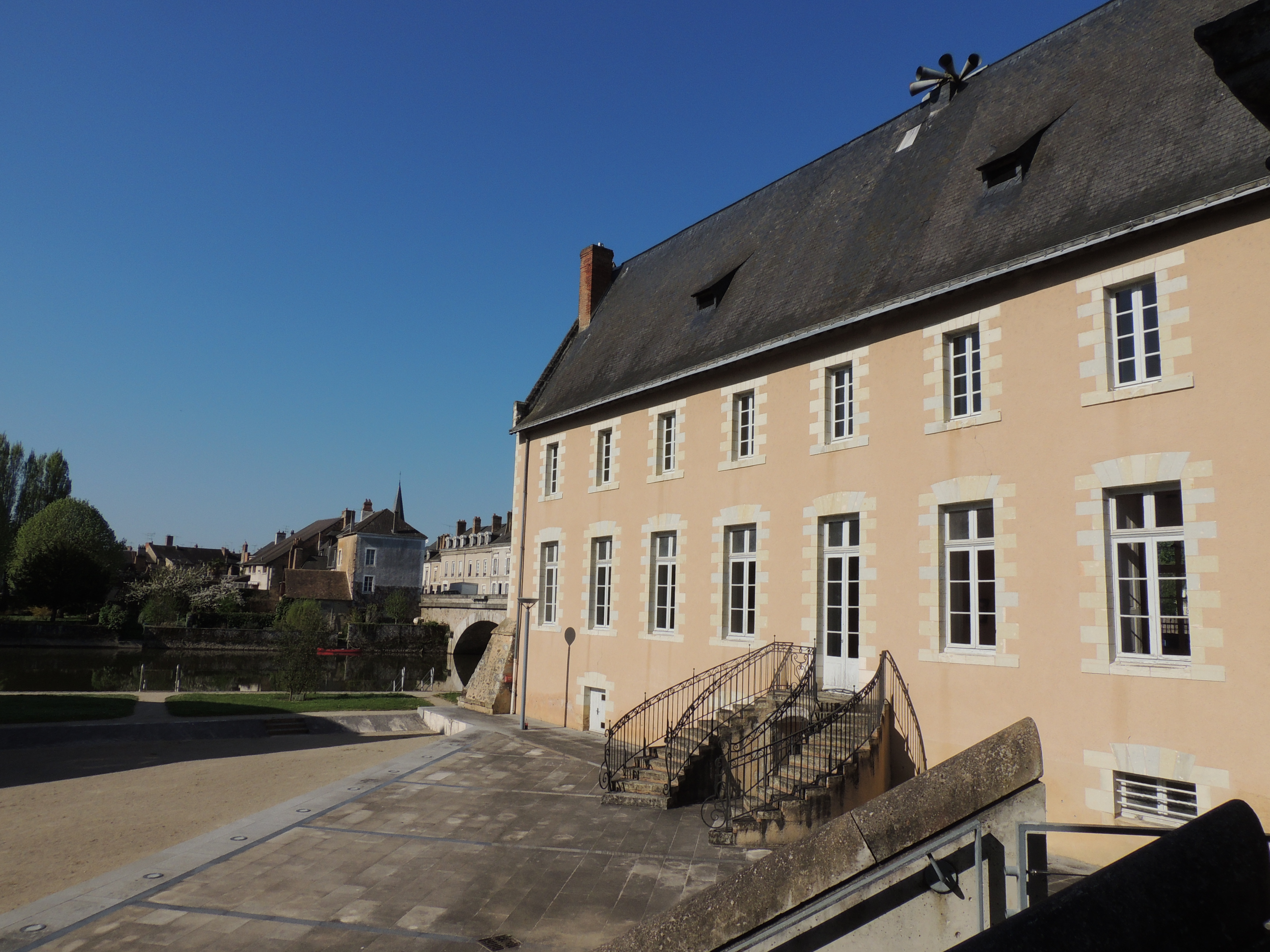
The east facade of the Carmes Castle

== Bibliography ==
- Schilte, Pierre (1980). La Flèche intra-muros [La Flèche intra-muros] (in French). Cholet: Farré. pp. 177–192.
- Schilte, Pierre (1987). Le château des Fouquet de la Varenne à La Flèche au XVIIe. Le Mans: Imprimerie Martin.
- Potron, Daniel (1999). Le XXe siècle à La Flèche : Première période : 1900-1944 [The 20th century in La Flèche: First period: 1900-1944] (in French). La Flèche: D. Potron. pp. 31–220.
- Potron, Daniel (2010). Le XXe siècle à La Flèche : Seconde période : 1944-2001 [The 20th century in La Flèche: Second period 1944-2001] (in French). La Flèche: D. Potron. pp. 415–420.
- Collectif (2000). Le patrimoine des communes de la Sarthe [The heritage of the communes of the Sarthe] (in French) (1 ed.). Paris: Flohic Éditions. p. 550. ISBN 9782842341060.
