= Halle-au-Blé =

Historic building in La Flèche, France

Flèche Hall
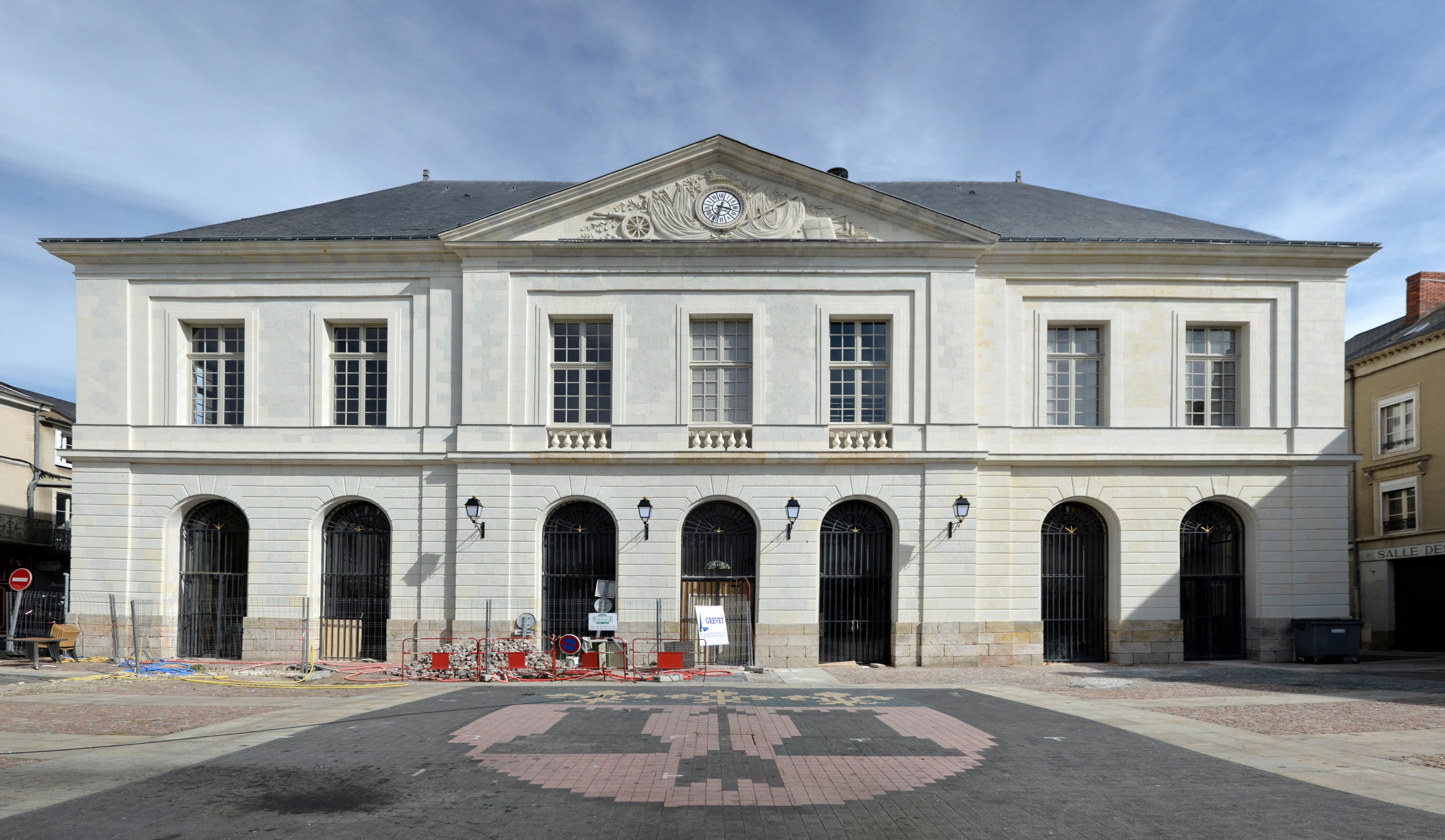
- The Wheat Market in La Flèche
- Interactive map of Flèche Hall
- Location: La Flèche, Sarthe
- Coordinates: 47°42′01″N 0°04′22″W
- Builder: Prosper Simon, Pierre-Felix Delarue, Adrien-Louis Lusson
- Type: Town hall, theater (since 1827), market hall
- Beginning date: late 18th century
- Patrimoniality: Listed as a historic monument (1987)

The Halle-au-Blé is a historic building located in La Flèche, in the Sarthe department. Constructed in the first half of the 18th century, it served as the town hall until 1910. Situated on the Place du Marché au Blé, between Rue de la Dauversière and Rue du Mouton, the building includes an Italian-style theater on the upper floor of its southern wing, decorated by Adrien-Louis Lusson. The Halle-au-Blé has been listed as a historical monument since 1987.

== History ==
=== Town hall ===
From the Middle Ages, wooden market halls occupied the site of the present Halle-au-Blé. In 1737, Marie de Tessé, Countess of La Luzerne and widow of Claude II Fouquet de la Varenne, Lord of La Flèche, ordered the demolition of these structures and their replacement with stone buildings combining market halls and a town hall. The project was carried out by the architect René Lespine. (Note: Schilte 1980, p. 109) By 1772, the need for reconstruction was raised again. The mayor, Pierre de la Rue du Can, decided to build a new town hall adjacent to the existing one, which was subsequently converted into a performance hall. The works were supervised by Prosper Simon, architect of the Collège. Construction of the new building, raised by an additional storey, began in 1775 and was completed in 1792. (Note: Schilte 1980, p. 110)

From 1827, the Halle-au-Blé underwent restoration and extension works under the direction of Pierre-Félix Delarue. During this period, a small Italian-style theater was installed on the upper floor of the right wing of the building. The Halle-au-Blé served as the town hall of La Flèche until municipal services were transferred to the Château des Carmes on 4 July 1910. (Note: Schilte 1980, p. 112)

The building was listed as a historical monument on 20 March 1987. Restoration of its façades was carried out over a fourteen-month period, and the renovated Halle-au-Blé was inaugurated in October 2012.

=== Halle-au-Blé theater ===
Located on the first floor of the Halle-au-Blé, the theater—originally known as the Petit Théâtre—is an Italian-style venue designed according to plans by the architect Pierre-Félix Delarue. It has a capacity of 135 seats and comprises a semicircular orchestra level with two superimposed balconies. The auditorium and cupola were decorated by Adrien-Louis Lusson, a native of La Flèche and an architect and decorator. After several years of restoration, the Petit Théâtre was inaugurated on 8 October 1989 with performances of a comedy by Émile Souvestre and two vaudevilles. From its opening, the theater was described in the local press as a “bonbonnière,” a term that has since been commonly used to refer to the venue.

The theater was closed to the public in September 1947 due to its deteriorated condition but continued to be used by local associations for meetings and events. It reopened in January 1963, when a local company organized several performances, despite the removal of the stage and the loss of some decorative elements. The Petit Théâtre underwent a complete restoration and was inaugurated on 11 March 1999. On this occasion, the municipal council renamed it the Théâtre de la Halle-au-Blé. The venue now hosts a range of performances as part of the local cultural season, primarily theatrical productions.

== Description ==
The building consists of a central block flanked by two wings aligned on the same axis and rises to two storeys. The ground floor contains a reception hall and a covered market, formerly used as a grain hall, with a surface area of 450 square metres. The first floor houses the theater, the stage tower, and rooms formerly used as the town hall, while the second floor is occupied by attic spaces.

The theater, designed in the Italian style, occupies the upper floor of the southern wing of the building. The auditorium consists of a semicircular orchestra level surmounted by two balconies containing several boxes separated by swan-neck–shaped partitions. The original decoration of the auditorium was designed by the architect and decorator Adrien-Louis Lusson, a native of La Flèche, who entrusted its execution to Humanité-René Philastre, Charles-Antoine Cambon, and their student Félix Cagé. The balconies are supported by wooden columns adorned with trompe-l'œil fluting and topped with palm-shaped capitals. The balustrades of the first tier of boxes are decorated with painted allegories of the performing arts, while those of the second tier feature dragon motifs. The auditorium is covered by a false elliptical dome decorated with vegetal motifs, including ribbons and floral garlands set against a blue background. The stage has a surface area of 50 square metres and is fitted with a Northern fir floor.

== See also ==
- La Flèche

== Bibliography ==
- Le Bœuf, François; Cauzinille, Yves; Codron, André (1999). Le théâtre de la Halle-au-Blé [The Halle-au-Blé Theater] (in French). La Flèche: Ville de La Flèche.
  - This offprint from issue 60 of the journal 303 Arts, Recherches et Créations was published by the City of La Flèche on the occasion of the inauguration of the Théâtre de la Halle-au-Blé on March 11, 1999.
- Schilte, Pierre (1980). La Flèche intra-muros [The intramural arrow] (in French). Cholet: Farré. pp. 109–116.
- Codron, André (1995). Le Petit Théâtre de La Flèche : passé, présent, avenir d'une « bonbonnière » [Le Petit Théâtre de La Flèche: past, present, and future of a “bonbonnière”] (in French). La Flèche: Association du Petit Théâtre de La Flèche.
- Collectif (2000). Le patrimoine des communes de la Sarthe [The heritage of the municipalities of Sarthe] (in French). Vol. 1. Paris: Flohic Éditions. pp. 563–564. ISBN 2-84234-106-6.
