= Church of Notre-Dame-des-Vertus, Aubervilliers =

Roman Catholic church in Seine-Saint-Denis, France

- French: Église Notre-Dame-des-Vertus d'Aubervilliers
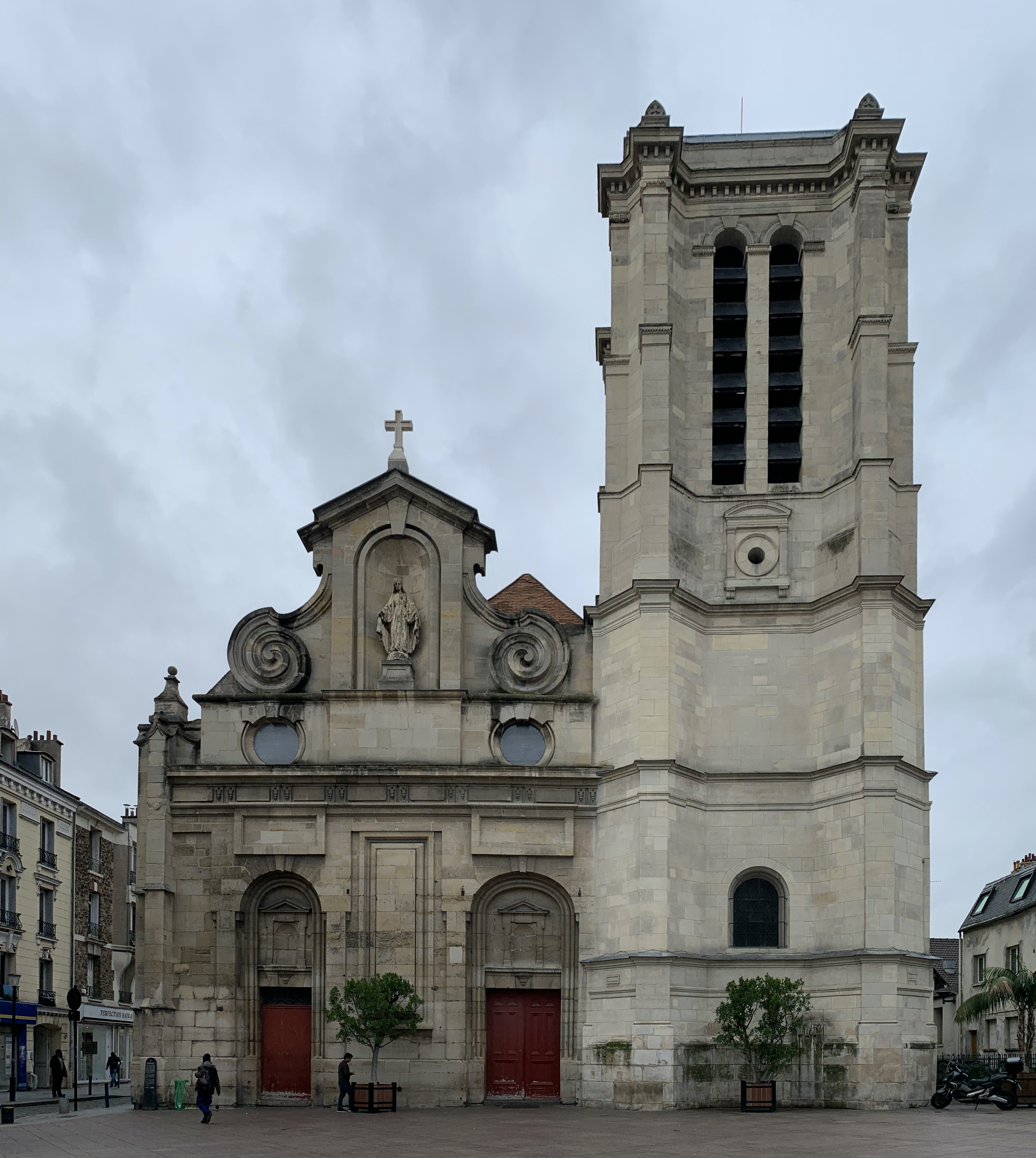

- Location within Paris and the inner ring
- 48°54′52″N 2°22′56″E
- Location: Place de la Mairie; Aubervilliers, Seine-Saint-Denis, France
- Country: France
- Denomination: Roman Catholic

History
- Status: Church
- Dedication: Our Lady

Architecture
- Functional status: Active
- Architectural type: Church
- Years built: 15th-century

Administration
- Diocese: Saint-Denis

Monument historique
- Official name: Eglise Notre-Dame-des-Vertus
- Criteria: Class MH
- Designated: 17 July 1908
- Reference no.: PA00079927

The church of Notre-Dame-des-Vertus is a Roman Catholic church in Aubervilliers, Seine-Saint-Denis, France. It is listed as a Historic Monument.

== History ==
A church named Saint-Christophe et Notre-Dame was mentioned on this site in the early 13th century. It may have been built in the Carolingian era. As of 1242, the chapel was affiliated with Saint-Marcel of Saint-Denis.

After a long drought on 14 May, 1336, a young girl praying the Virgin Mary saw the eyes of the statue cry and heard the rain fall in the same time. After the miracle, the chapel could not accommodate the flow of pilgrims and a new church was built on the site in the 15th century.

The 30-meter-high squared tower, dated 1541 according to an inscription on its base, is said to have been built by Louis XI. In 1623, the Oratorians settled in the buildings given by Francis II of Montholon. A Jesuit-style façade was erected around 1628. A 9-meter-high spire was added in the 19th century but was destroyed by a fire in 1900.

In 1614, Louis XIII pronounced his vows in the church and notably promised to "build a church dedicated to the Virgin in Paris if the struggle against the Protestants was victorious". So he built Notre-Dame-des-Victoires which is considered as the daughter church of Notre-Dame-des-Vertus.

An organ was manufactured from 1630 to 1635. It was restored by organ builders Robert Chauvin from Dax and Louis Benoist and Pierre Sarelot from Le Mans. It is the only preserved organ of the 17th-century in Île-de-France. It was inaugurated on 10 November 1990 by organist Michel Chapuis and Alain Cuny. The organ has 30 stops, three keyboards and a French-style pedalboard.

In 2012, the church was restored at a cost of €1.367 million, co-financed by the Regional Directorate of Cultural Affairs (DRAC, 40 percent), the municipality of Aubervilliers (30 percent) and the Regional and General councils.

The church was listed as a Class Historic Monument on 17 July 1908.

== Pilgrimage ==
A pilgrimage takes place every year from the Basilica of Saint-Denis to the church of Notre-Dame-des-Vertus. Another former pilgrimage from Saint-Denys de la Chapelle to Notre-Dame des Vertus granted the pilgrims plenary indulgence.

This devotion dates back to 1338, when the celebration was held on the second Tuesday of May. The celebrations took place on the feast days of Annunciation, Easter Monday and Tuesday, on 1 May (the date of the current pilgrimage) and other days.

On 22 May, 1452, Cardinal Guillaume d'Estouteville granted indulgence to the visitors of Notre-Dame-des-Vertus. These were extended by Pope Paul V on Immaculate Conception Day.
