= Martin Ekani =

French footballer (born 1984)

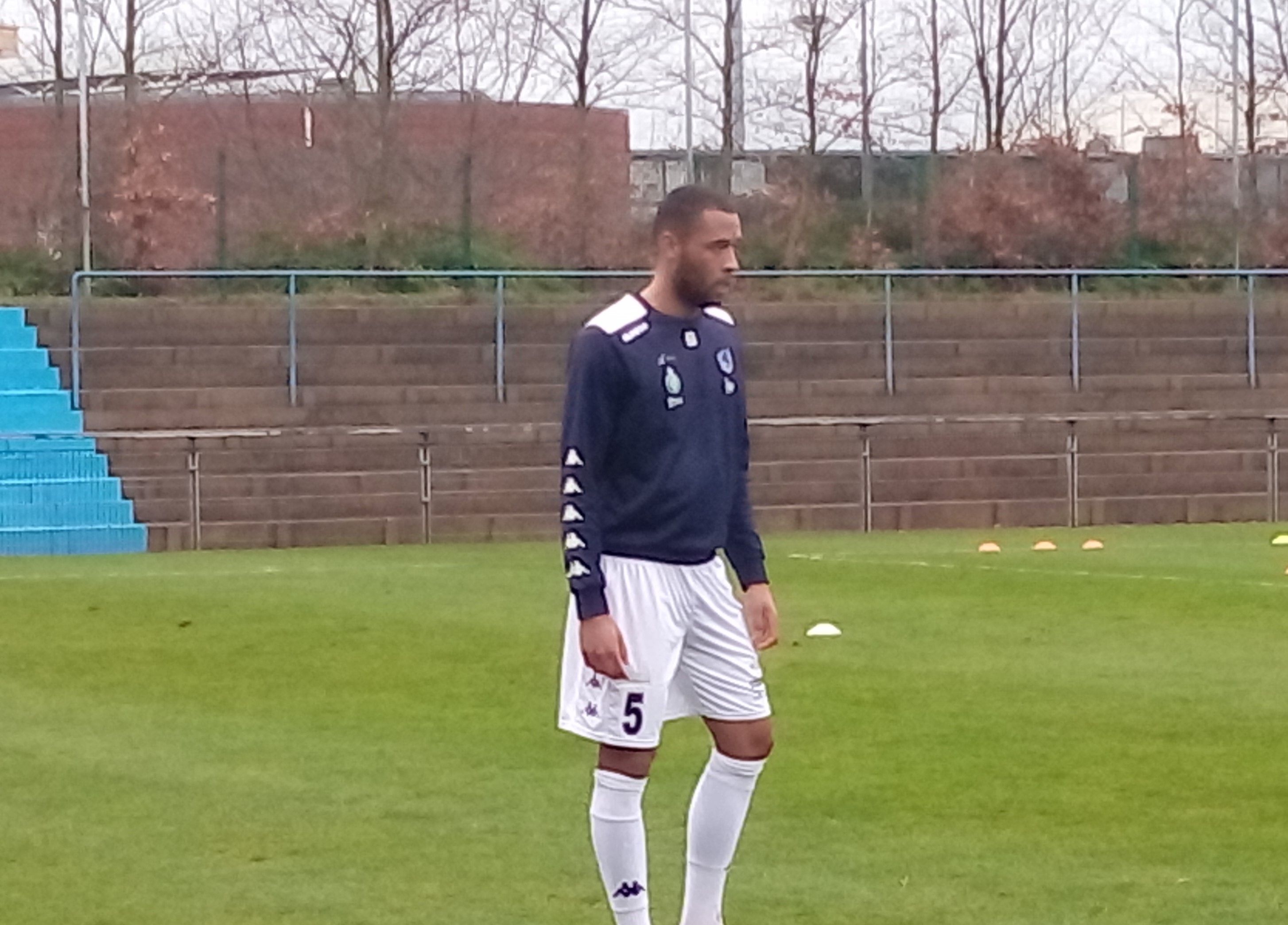
Ekani in 2017

Martin Ekani (born 21 April 1984) is a French former professional footballer who played as a defender in Ligue 1 for Lens and in Ligue 2 for Angers.
