= History of Suresnes =

Historical commune in the western suburbs of Paris

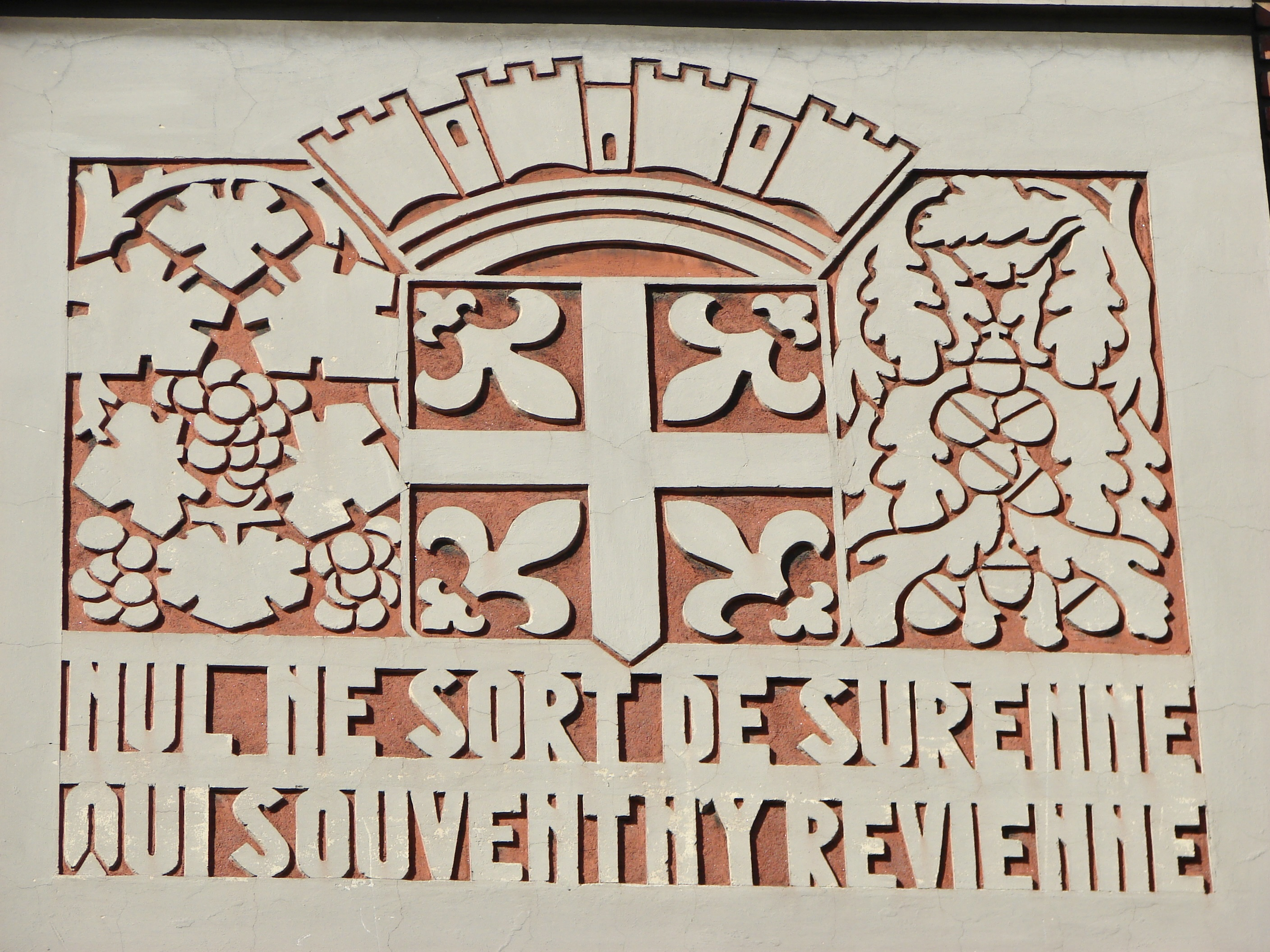
Suresnes motto inscribed on the facade of the Paul Langevin high school: "No one leaves Surenne who often does not return there". (Note: "Surenne" is the old spelling of the town of Suresnes.)

The history of Suresnes (Hauts-de-Seine), a commune in the western suburbs of Paris, is closely linked to its unique geographical position between the Seine and Mont Valérien, one of the highest points in the Paris conurbation. Its economic activities have historically developed in line with this environment, from fishing on the river to vine-growing on the hillsides, the automotive and aeronautics industries along the Seine, and, since the creation of the La Défense business center in the neighboring towns of Courbevoie and Puteaux, the headquarters of major corporations.

Location of Suresnes in the inner suburbs of Paris.

A simple Carolingian villa first mentioned in the 9th century, Suresnes remained a small outlying village until the 19th century. Not connected to the main roads leading to the capital, it was almost self-sufficient, even though it suffered several periods of destruction during the Middle Ages and Modern Era. However, as the hillsides became covered with vineyards, the town's reputation grew, and writers celebrated the wine of Suresnes. Establishing a religious pilgrimage to Mont Valérien in the 16th century also contributed to the development of the town's economy, as devotees had to walk the village paths to the Calvary, and cabarets were set up in Suresnes to entertain them. In the 17th and 18th centuries, numerous bourgeois and aristocratic residences with vast gardens grew up around the historic center, where wealthy Parisians came to relax. In 1593, one of them even made his property available to host negotiation conferences between Catholics and Protestants, which helped end the Wars of Religion.

Diagram of Suresnes.

From the mid-19th century onwards, the face of Suresnes changed radically, with the arrival of the train, tramway, and navigation services on the Seine: the town was now within easy reach of Parisians, who flocked to the guinguettes lining its quays, often after attending the races at the nearby Longchamp racecourse. The development of industry from the 1890s onwards led to the establishment of numerous factories, gradually eradicating the Ancien Régime's properties: Suresnes was now an industrial town with a rapidly growing working-class population. The election of Henri Sellier as mayor of Suresnes in 1919 led to considerable urban change: a promoter of workers' housing and driven by hygienic ideas, the mayor increased the number of public services (schools, medical dispensaries, etc.) and housing projects, with his garden city considered a model of its kind. However, he was dismissed by Vichy in 1941. During the Occupation, a thousand resistance fighters were executed by the Nazis in Fort Mont-Valérien, a military building that had replaced the Calvary in the mid-19th century. The second half of the 20th century saw a new urban metamorphosis, as factories disappeared and were gradually replaced by residential buildings and service and high-tech companies.

== Geology ==
Suresnes historian René Sordes describes the town as situated “on a small alluvial plateau, sheltered from flooding, at the foot of Mont Valérien, on the banks of the tranquil Seine, opposite the beautiful Rouvray forest, of which all that remains today is our Bois de Boulogne.”

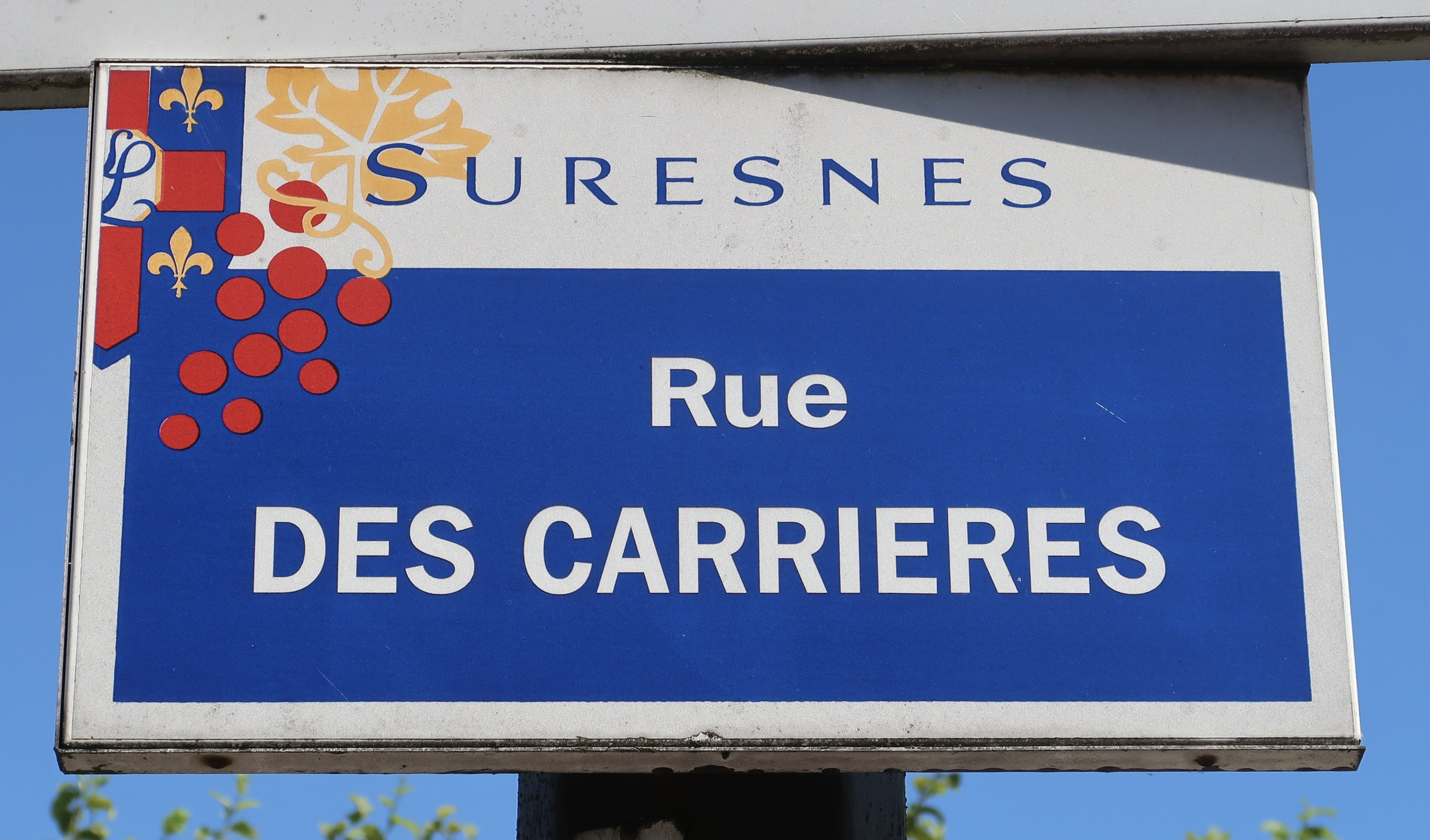
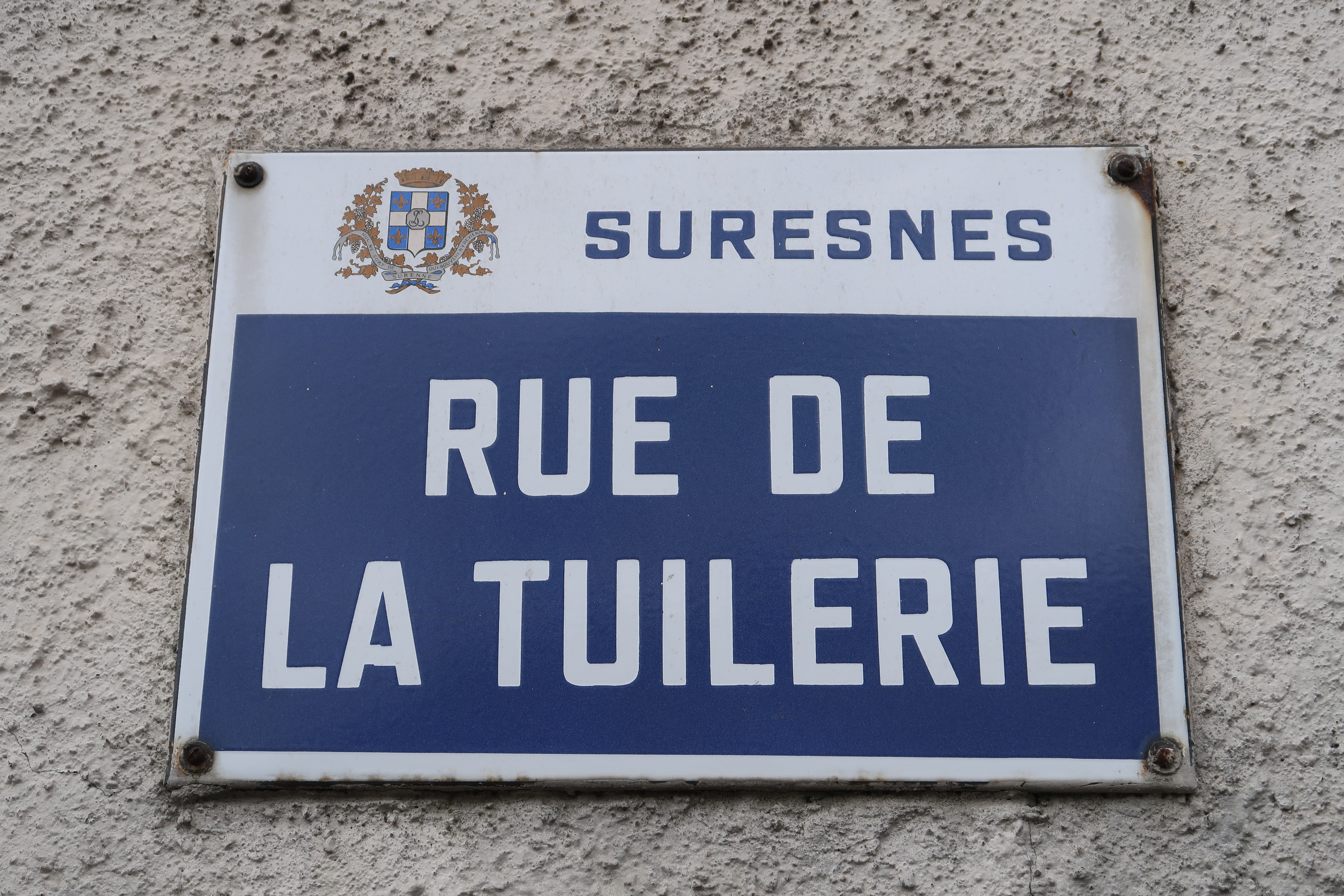
Street plaques for Rue des Carrières and Rue de la Tuilerie, recalling their historical activities related to the geology of Suresnes.

Suresnes is located on the “Gennevilliers peninsula,” a meander of the Seine 15 km long and 5 km wide. Until the 19th century, this meant that Suresnes and the surrounding towns were geographically isolated. Bordered by the hills of Montretout, Garches, and La Celle-Saint-Cloud, the commune is dominated by Mont Valérien, a 162-metre high butte that bears witness to major deposits eroded during the Quaternary period. The mountain is located on the last spur of the Beauce plateau, on its northeastern edge. The Lutetian period also saw the formation of coarse-grained limestone in the region, which was used in the construction of Notre-Dame de Paris Cathedral, the Louvre, and some of the houses in Suresnes. During the same period, when many lagoons were spreading out, seawater evaporated, forming gypsum, giving Suresnes large gypsum quarries. Toponymy has preserved this memory, as evidenced by the presence of a "rue des Carrières". Until the 19th century, plaster furnaces were located in the "Fécheray" area, (Note: Formerly "Feucheret", derived from the word "fern".) which is said to have been used in the construction of the Château de Versailles and the Château de Bagatelle. During the Sannois period, the sea covered these lagoons, and green clays (marls) were deposited: they were later used to make roof tiles, as evidenced by the surviving "rue de la Tuilerie". In the 16th century, sculptor Girolamo della Robbia used these clays to create artistic coverings for the Château de Madrid, built in the Bois de Boulogne.

== Prehistory and Antiquity ==
There is evidence of human presence on the Gennevilliers peninsula during the Neolithic period. Archaeological remains dating from this period have been found in Suresnes, including a carved and polished axe at the Croix-du-Roy crossroads, blades at the foot of the American cemetery, and a deer horn used as a pick at Fécheray.

During Protohistory, the Mont Valérien site was considered important by the Gallic Parisii people, with the Gennevilliers peninsula forming part of their domain. Gallic druids may have worshipped here. After the Roman conquest, the mountain undoubtedly became imperial property. The creation of a land register under Emperor Diocletian, and the absence of any new names or divisions of the estate, suggest that during the Gallo-Roman period, and indeed until the 6th century, this territory remained unchanged. Proof that Gallo-Romans once resided within the perimeter of present-day Suresnes is provided by the exhumation of a tomb on what is now Place Henri-IV, containing a classical-type lamp. Pieces of pottery and glass, as well as two coins (representing Hadrian), were also unearthed by diggers in a garden on rue Pierre-Dupont, while a coin representing Faustina Augusta was found during work on rue des Carrières. However, until the end of Antiquity, this area was of minor importance, and it was the site of the neighboring town of Nanterre, which was considered the spiritual center of the peninsula.

The name Mont Valérien (Mons Valerianus or Mons Valeriani in the earliest mentions) is said to derive from Valerian, a Roman emperor who had a villa there. However, there is no certainty as to the origin of this term, which may also have a military origin.

== Early and Middle Middle Ages ==
=== First mention of Suresnes ===
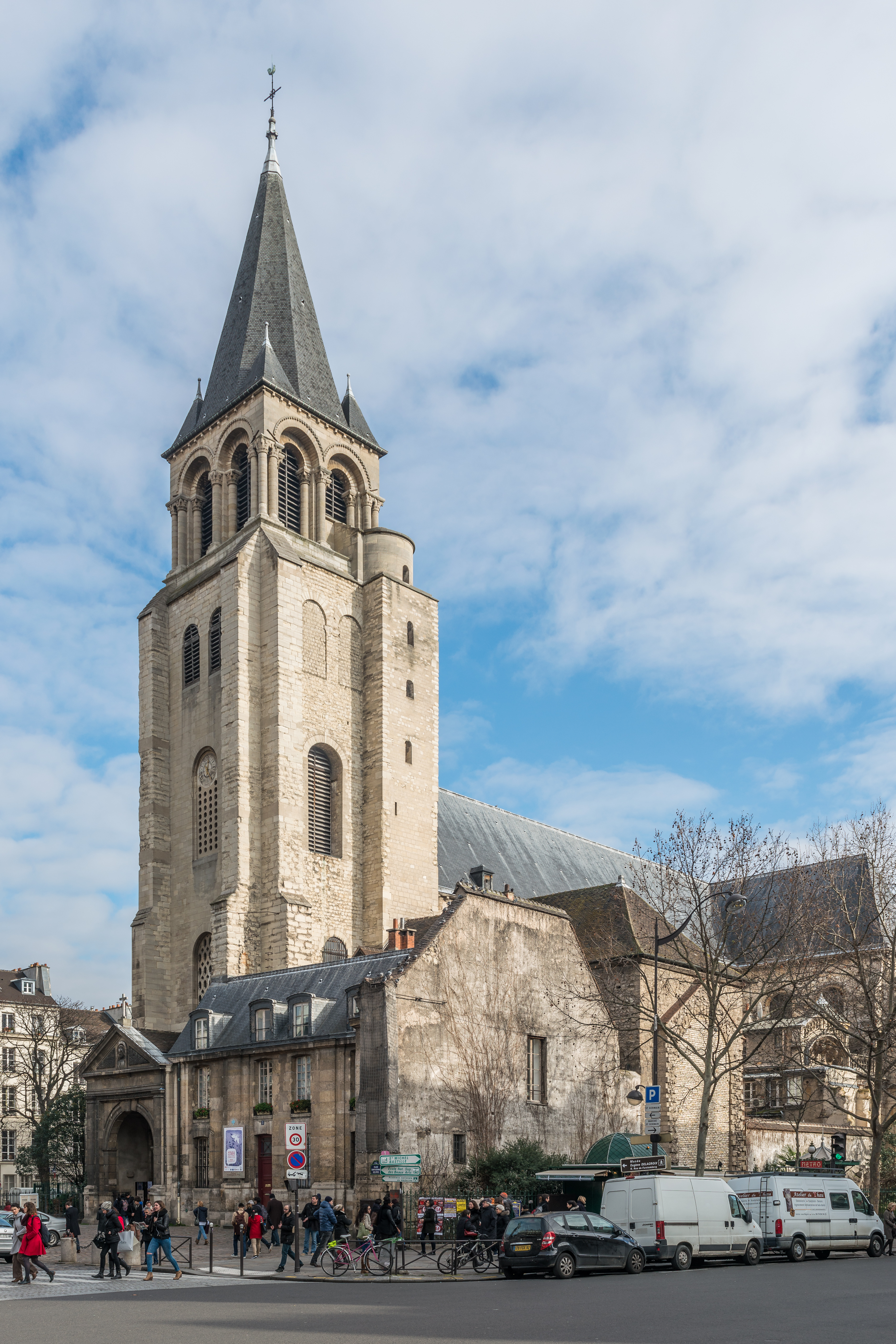
Church of the Abbey of Saint-Germain-des-Prés, owner of the lands of Suresnes for almost a millennium.

In October 1885, during the construction of a section of the railway line from Moulineaux to Suresnes, earth workers unearthed fifteen plaster coffins with funerary furnishings, part of an ancient Frankish-Pagan cemetery. Around 1900, at the same time as the above-mentioned find in rue Pierre-Dupont, two coffins were discovered, probably dating from the end of the 5th century. According to René Sordes, it is therefore possible that Mont Valérien was once occupied by a Frankish military post designed to keep watch over the Seine valley.

To appease them, King Clovis and his successors tended to give the other Frankish chieftains estates far from the capital, reserving those around Paris for the less turbulent ecclesiastics who restored a certain temporal order. The estate of Rueil-Malmaison and its outbuildings (on which Clovis had had a church built at Saint Geneviève's request, and where she was initially buried), on which the Gennevilliers peninsula certainly depended, was thus donated on March 27, 875 by King Charles II the Bald to the Abbey of Saint-Denis. However, the troubles caused by Norman incursions and the weakness of the abbots in the 9th and 10th centuries undermined the religious institution's authority over these lands, leading to usurpations. In the 10th century, what remained of the estate was given to the powerful abbey of Saint-Germain-des-Prés. The territory on which Suresnes is located was therefore subject to the great Parisian abbeys even before its birth. Each of the villages in the western part of Paris, however, had a modest and essentially rural dimension, with Nanterre retaining only relative supremacy over them.

For René Sordes, it was at the turn of the 9th and 10th centuries that Suresnes “entered the history books.” Indeed, in 884, Carloman donated vast estates to the abbey of Saint-Leufroy (Normandy), which his grandfather, Charles le Chauve, had already promised them. This donation includes "Surisna [Suresnes] in its entirety", the first historical mention of the village. However, continued Viking invasions at the end of the century led the monks to flee to the Parisian abbey of Saint-Germain-des-Prés. After being admitted to their community, the abbey of Saint-Leufroy de facto disappeared, rendering Carloman's donation moot. Robert, the brother of Count Eudes of Paris, then obtained from King Charles III the Simple (who owed him his crown) the charter of May 14, 918, which, repeating the terms of Carloman's donation, formalized the transfer of the estate to Saint-Germain-des-Prés.

=== Sources de Suresnes ===
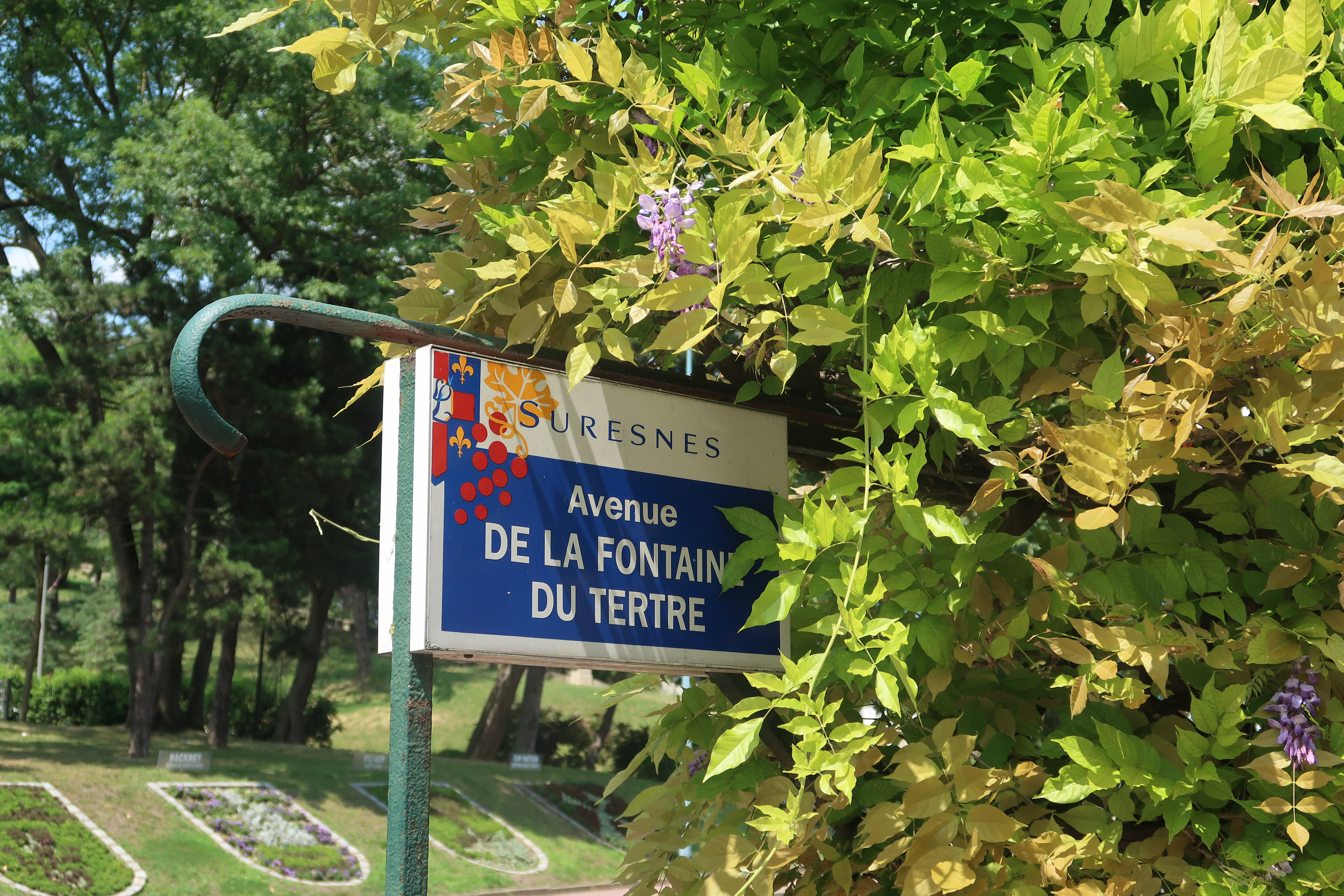
Plaque on Avenue de la Fontaine-du-Tertre, in homage to the old spring.

According to local historians, the word "Surisnas, Surisnae, or Surisna" is of Celtic hydronym origin, i.e., derived from the word "source". Indeed, numerous springs were gushing out of Mont Valérien, both on the Suresnes side and on the Nanterre side. As the Gauls worshipped the forces of nature, associated with deities, it's conceivable that they worshipped the goddess Surisna here. As Christianization did not completely eradicate Gallic saints from the countryside, substitutions were often made, with the Christian saint taking the place of the Gallic god, as probably happened to Surisna.

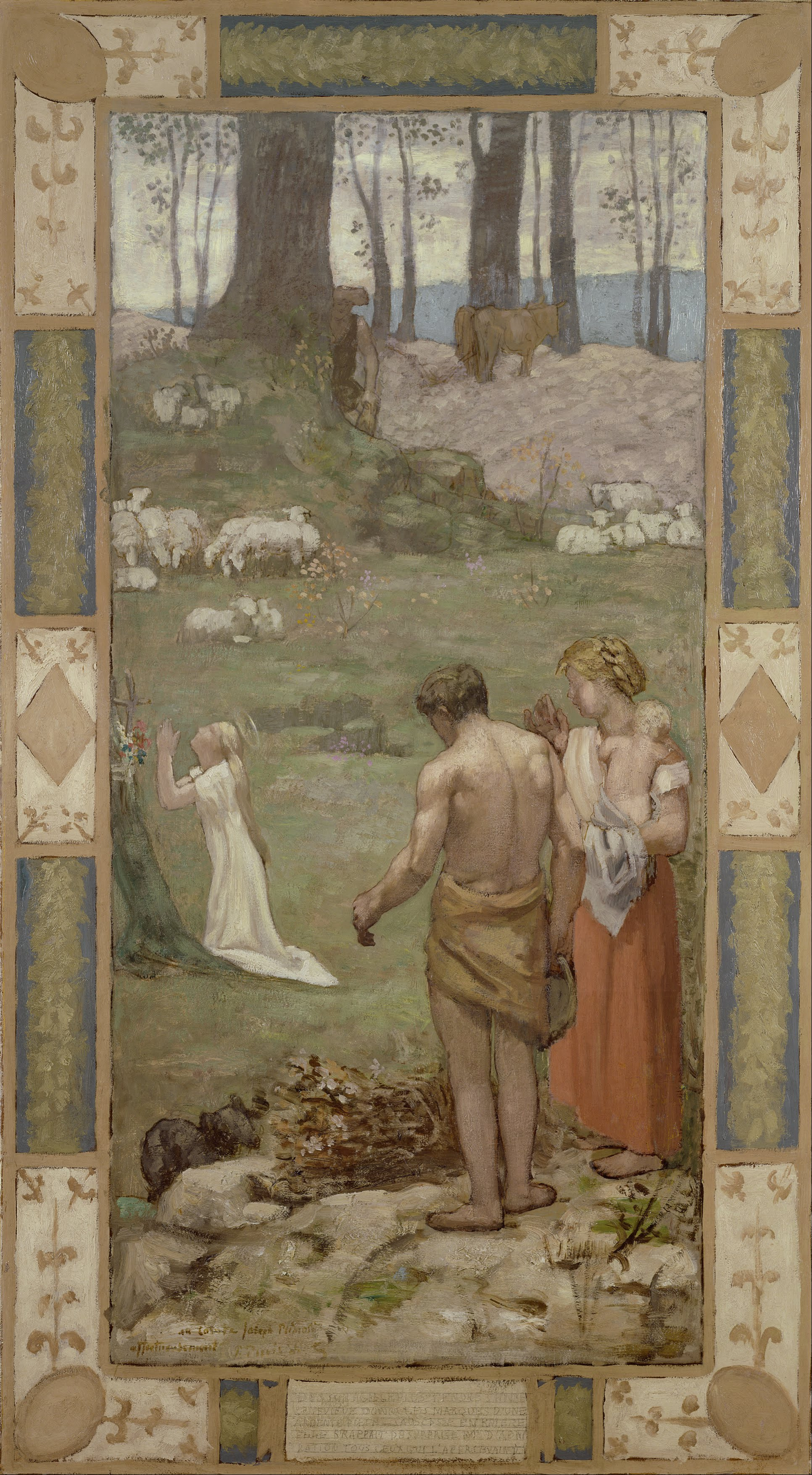
Painting by Pierre Puvis de Chavannes, L'enfance de Sainte Geneviève (between 1874 and 1876), depicting the saint as a child on Mont Valérien, in homage to the legend that she grazed her sheep there. (Note: The misconception that Genevieve was a shepherdess was, in fact, developed by 15th-century iconography. In reality, she came from an aristocratic family.)

At the end of the 19th century, there were still several springs in Suresnes, the best-known of which was the Fontaine du Tertre, which was destroyed in 1907. The nearby Avenue de la Fontaine-du-Tertre is a reminder of this fountain. The fountain was said to have curative powers for the eyes, in connection with a legend according to which Saint Geneviève came to Mont Valérien to give her sheep a drink and restored her mother's sight thanks to the water from the well serving the family home. (Note: A well recalling this story still exists today, but is located in Nanterre, on the other side of Mont Valérien.) Much later, in 1131, when Parisians were suffering from "mal des ardents", an inflammation of the skin, only the procession of the saint's shrine could cure the sick. Pilgrims would later flock to the Tertre fountain to have their eyes cured, and still do several centuries later.

=== Domaine de Suresnes ===
In Gaulish times, only loggers would have frequented the marshy banks of this area, which gradually dried out. The Romans may then have cleared the land and planted vines. The higher parts of Mont Valérien were used for livestock farming. Soldiers and settlers must have moved in later, and a small hamlet developed between the 7th and 10th centuries. By that time, its boundaries were probably similar to those drawn up in the 17th century: to the north, towards Puteaux, the rue des Bas-Rogers separated the Saint-Germain-des-Prés estate from that of Saint-Denis; to the west, several paths (des Chênes, des Traineaux and the sente des Bartoux) delimited the territory, passing over the grounds of the American cemetery, the sentier de la Motte, the boulevard du Maréchal-de-Lattre-de-Tassigny, the rue des Bons-Raisins and the Chemin du Syndicat-des-Cultivateurs, the sente du Val d'Or marking the boundary of the Saint-Germain-des-Prés estate, and to the south the Chemin du Val d'Or separating Suresnes from Saint-Cloud. However, there is little information on the evolution of the estate. The terms Val d'Or, Vaux d'Or, or sometimes Veaux d'Or are commonly used, meaning a rich, fertile valley.

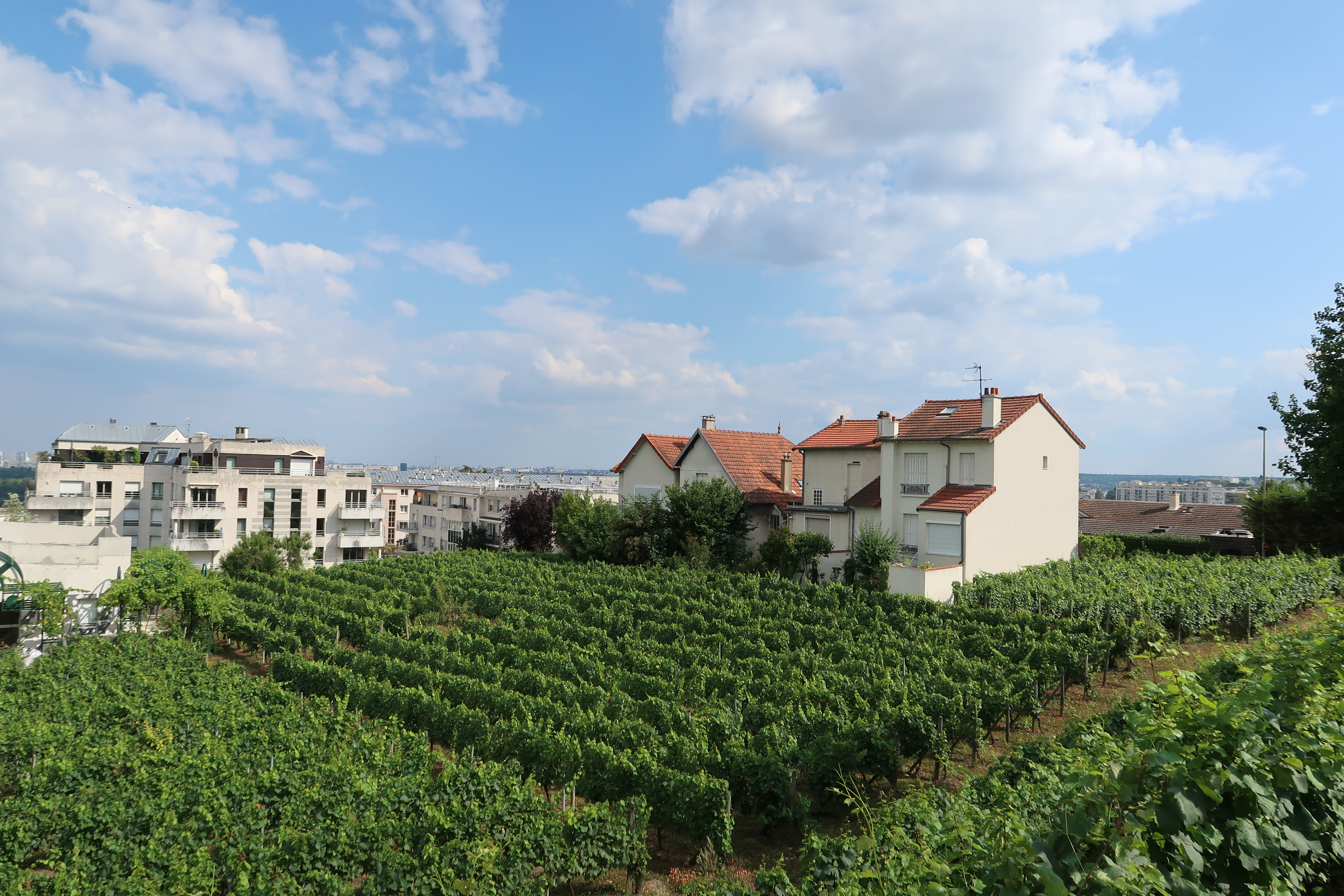
Suresnes vineyards in contemporary times: they currently extend over only one hectare, almost all of the former wine-growing land having been urbanized since the 19th century.

The large estate of La-Celle-Saint-Cloud (567 hectares in the 9th century) had a major influence on the neighboring estate of Suresnes (300 hectares). Also owned by Saint-Germain-des-Prés, it was home to some 320 inhabitants, vineyards, arable land, and acres of woodland (as evidenced by the name of Rue des Chênes). In Suresnes, the hillsides were covered with vines (as were many of the hills and plateaus in the Paris region), while a fifth of the territory was planted with a variety of crops. It is likely that in 918, Suresnes was under the tutelage of the neighboring domain in terms of farming and administration. The vintages of Beaujolais and Burgundy were reserved for aristocratic tables, while those of the Île-de-France region, including Suresnes, were prized by the people of Paris.

To avoid the Seine overflowing its banks and the marshy odors of the river, the center of Suresnes would have been located on a small plateau formed by the river's ancient alluvial deposits, on land corresponding to today's Scheurer-Kestner Alley, bounded by rue Émile-Zola, rue du Puits-d'Amour, rue de la Huchette and rue Étienne-Dolet. The chapel, then the village church, certainly stood on this site, surrounded by simple houses. In the 12th century, the abbots would also have erected buildings on the banks of the Seine to collect tithes, house the mayor and his staff, and supervise the management of the estate. The seigniorial house was located not far from the current bridge, on the eastern side. With a slow-growing population of just a few hundred, Suresnes was also home to many artisans. The later development of Suresnes took place along a north-south axis parallel to the Seine: rue d'en Haut (now rue Émile-Zola and rue de Verdun, leading to Courbevoie and on to Paris) and rue d'en Bas (now rue de Saint-Cloud, rue des Bourets and rue Ledru-Rollin, which led to Puteaux to the north and Saint-Cloud to the south), as well as various paths, some of which have been preserved in contemporary roads. The marshy lands along the Seine were then drained once and for all, and the clearing of the land around Suresnes was also completed. In addition to vines, Suresnois winegrowers also raise poultry, cattle, and pigs.

=== Saint-Leufroy church ===
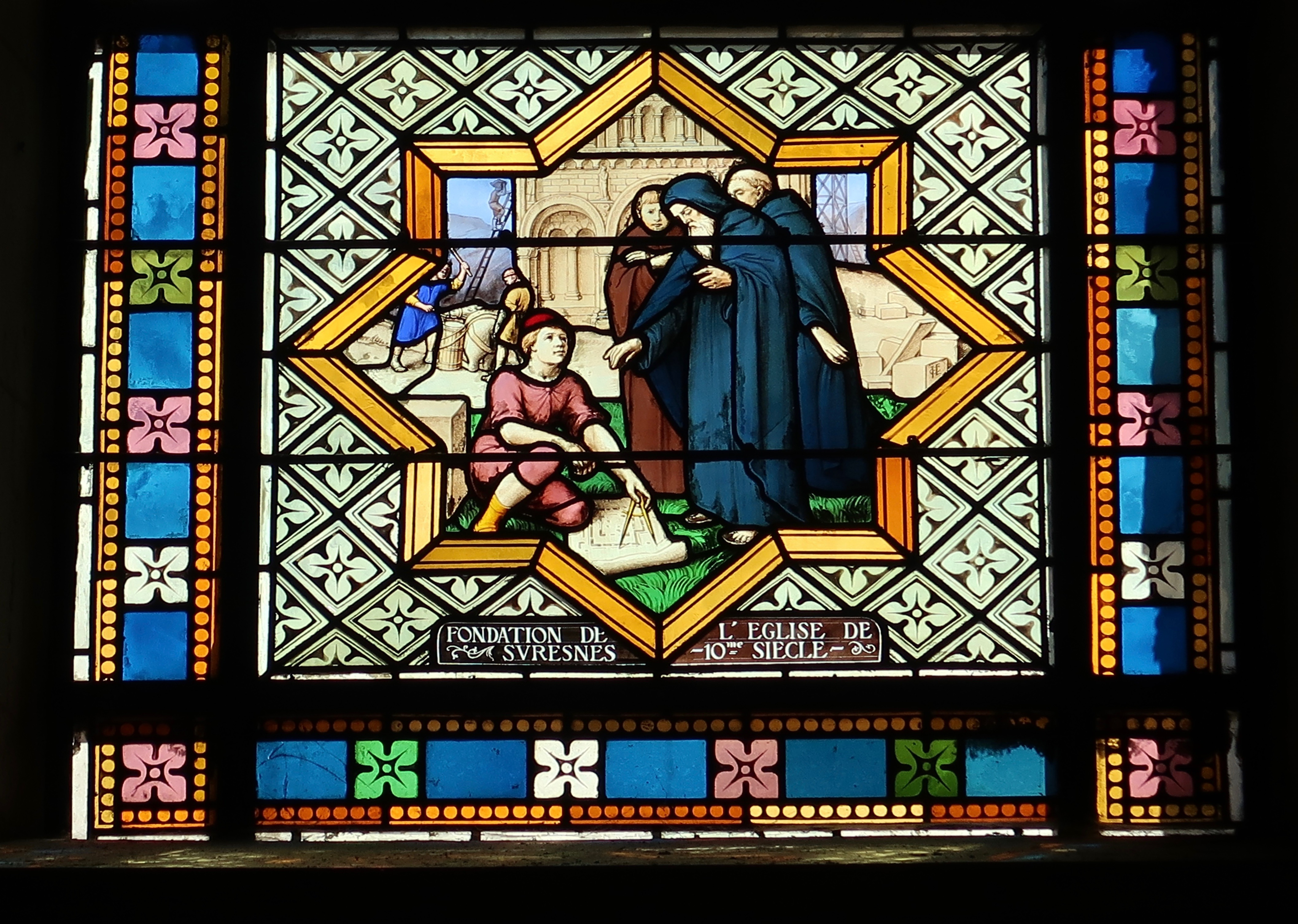
Stained glass window in the Church of the Immaculate Heart of Mary depicting the founding of the first church in Suresnes.

Before Charles le Chauve's donation, the parish of Saint-Maurice de Nanterre served the faithful of Suresnes, but the journey was long and arduous. The abbots of Saint-Germain therefore asked their bishop for permission to build a chapel in Suresnes, in accordance with an 803 capitulary. The chapel was built around 910. An agreement signed in 1070 between the abbot of Saint-Germain and bishop Geoffroy de Boulogne unreservedly recognized that Suresnes belonged to the abbey, and no longer to the episcopal authority. Although the neighboring village of Puteaux had belonged to the Abbey of Saint-Denis since 875, it had no church, so its faithful came to pray in Suresnes, forming the parish of Suresnes-Puteaux, where the Abbey of Saint-Germain also collected tithes. It wasn't until 1509 that Puteaux was able to build a chapel, and only in 1717 that it was able to constitute an independent parish from that of Suresnes. However, certain practices and marks of superiority remained imposed on Puteaux.

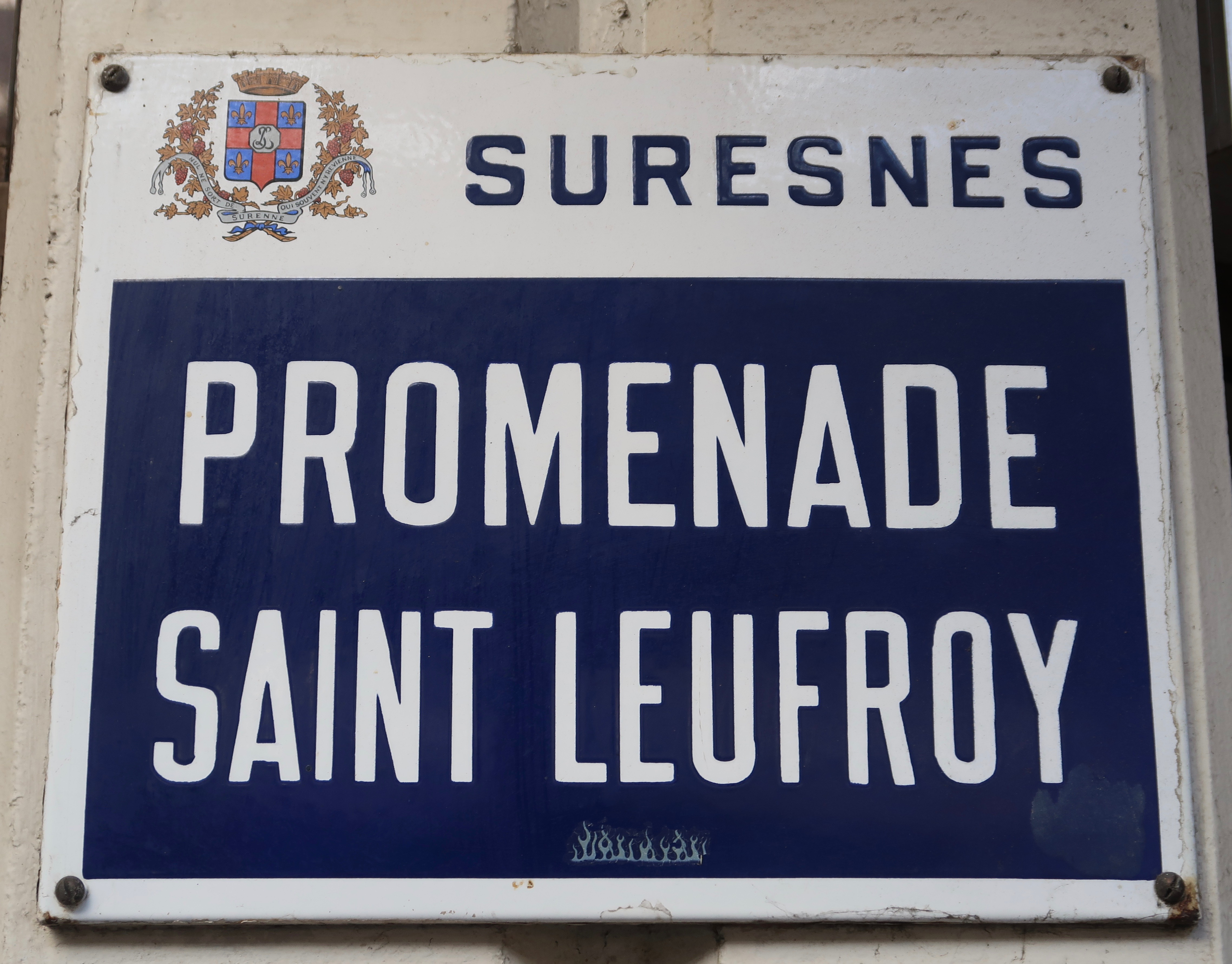
Plaque on the Saint-Leufroy promenade, in the district where the old church was located.

There are no architectural references to the 10th-century chapel. It is possible that the passage under the authority of Saint-Germain-des-Prés led to the construction of a larger building and that, in the 12th century, the chapel became a church in the Gothic style. It was damaged during the Hundred Years' War and destroyed in 1590 by the Huguenots during the Wars of Religion. Still, certain architectural elements were preserved, giving the renovated building a heterogeneous style. The church was demolished in 1905-1906.

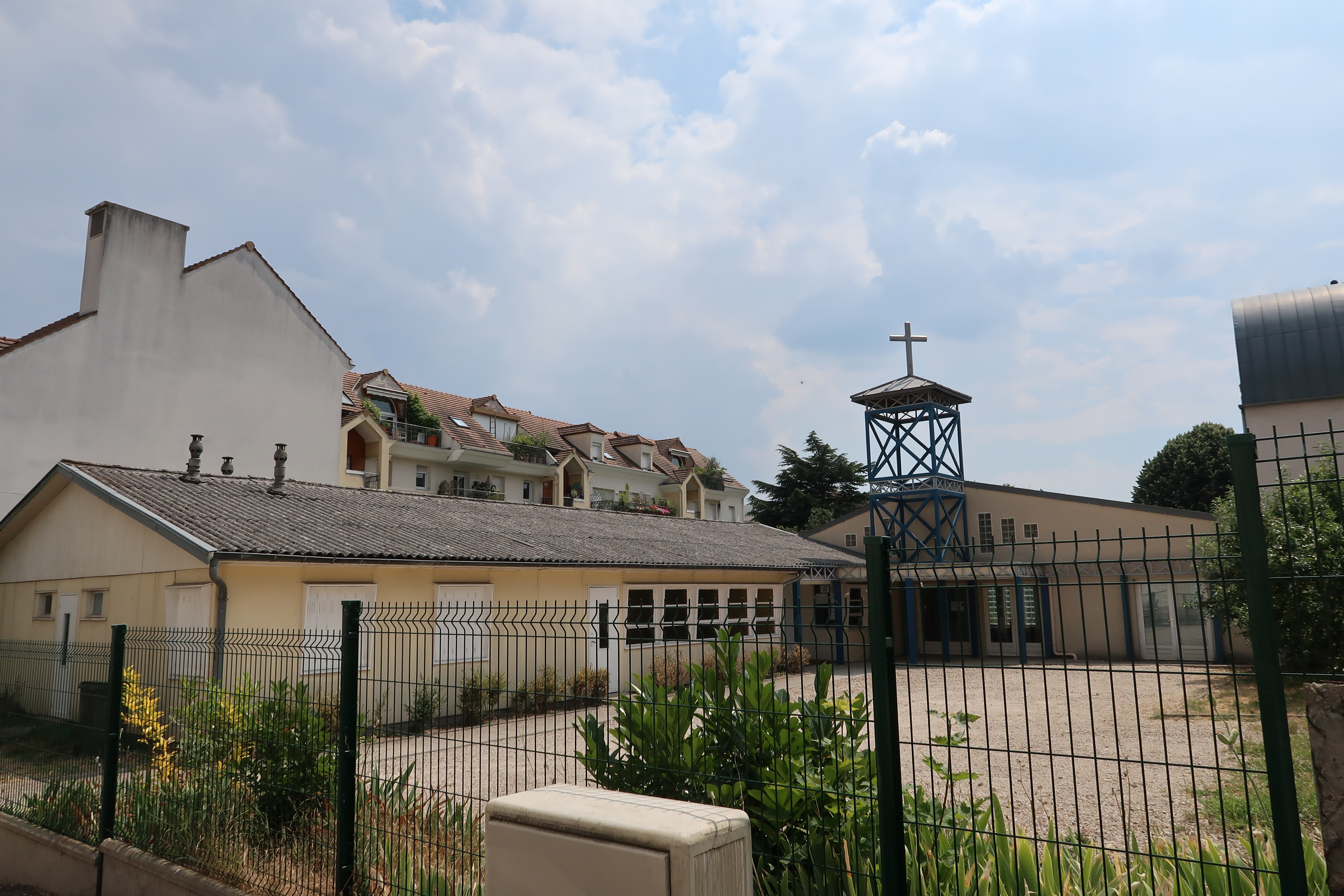
The Saint-Leufroy chapel, whose name recalls the thousand-year-old church of Suresnes destroyed in 1906.

On January 22, 1222, the church received a portion of Saint Leufroy's ashes, which led to the building being named after the saint. (Note: In particular a rib, later replaced, after its disappearance and thanks to a donation from the abbey, by a leg.) A fire at the end of the 16th century damaged the relics, and the shrine (which had been modified several times) was finally sold during the French Revolution to a woodcutter for use as a rabbit cage. Discarded, the relics were picked up by a devotee, who later gave them to the parish priest of Suresnes, after which they were no longer mentioned. Although ecclesiastics preserved a small bone, its authenticity is doubtful. After the church's demolition in 1906, its successor changed its name to Église du Cœur-Immaculé-de-Marie de Suresnes, although St. Leufroy remains theoretically the patron saint of Suresnes, and a small chapel erected in 1947 on rue du Chemin-Vert is dedicated to him.

In 1977, students from the Paul-Langevin High School carried out excavations on the site of the former Saint-Leufroy church (now the Suresnes 2 shopping center), revealing that it was originally a rectangular chapel, to which an apsidal chapel was later added, creating a Gothic church, “flanked by a flamboyant aisle and chevet,” which was rebuilt after the Hundred Years' War. This church was to resemble Notre-Dame-de-Pitié in Puteaux, with almost identical apses.

=== Early developments ===
The first mayor of Suresnes whose name has been preserved is "Gui", who appeared in court in 1161 for insubordination to the abbey. The judicial text, which confirms that the village was administered by a mayor and his subordinates, all of whom came under the jurisdiction of the abbey, mentions the existence of several small civil servants and artisans, who, in addition to the winegrowers, made up the population of Suresnes at the time. In France, however, the mayor was considered inefficient, and the public prosecutor was born, appointed from among the notables, approved by the seigneur, and entrusted with some thankless maintenance and management tasks in the service of the community.

The evolution of property rights and freedoms in the 13th century remained advantageous to the abbots: the estate remained theirs. Still, outsiders from Suresnes could acquire shares and dispose of them, provided they paid a substantial fee. Several Parisian bourgeois thus acquired the Suresnes vineyards, to make good investments and own modest or comfortable country houses near Paris. Their land was cultivated by laborers, often from Brittany, Normandy, or Picardy. The emancipation of the serfs on the estates surrounding Suresnes during this same century suggests that the village had already done away with serfdom for some time. Also in the 13th century, the prior of La Celle-Saint-Cloud still retained certain prerogatives over Suresnes, including receiving royalties owed by his winegrowers.

From the 13th to the 16th century, certain knights bore the title "de Suresnes" (Sorenis or Syrenis), lending credence to the hypothesis that the monastery may have ceded them a portion of territory and that "seigneurs de Suresnes" may have existed. In reality, these were only modest individuals to whom certain lands may have been temporarily granted as a reward for protection or legal aid, but who never used this title except to specify their identity. There were also fiefs in Suresnes, a word which at the time did not designate noble property as it would later, but land owned by commoners, even servile personalities.

== Late Middle Ages ==
From the 14th to the 19th century, Suresnes remained largely unchanged. By the end of the Middle Ages, however, the built-up area had expanded: the church district was joined by the “four banal” district, (Note: With the Rue des Cheaudeaux, now Rue Étienne-Dolet, and the Place des Courqueux.) Rue d'En-Bas (Note: Current Rue des Bourets.) and Rue d'En-Haut. (Note: Formerly Rue du Moutier — an old form of the word “monastery” — then Rue de l’Église and currently Rue Émile-Zola.) Bourgeois country houses for Parisian officials and magistrates were built around the village, sometimes including large gardens where these notables came to enjoy the peace of Suresnes while looking after their property. Urbanization was limited, however, and the push north towards Puteaux was not yet on the agenda.

The Hundred Years' War disrupted the tranquility of Suresnes. In 1346, King Edward III of England set foot in France and his troops pillaged the area around Paris. No sources mention Suresnes in these destructions, but these events likely had repercussions on the town. Later, the English king Henry VI confiscated many of Suresnes' lands and gave them to his secretary, Étienne Bruneau, until the victory of Formigny in 1450.

Because of the destruction suffered by La Celle-Saint-Cloud during the war, the Abbey of Saint-Germain installed a provost-monk in Suresnes to manage the "provostry of La-Celle-Suresnes". The administrative center of the estate thus moved to Suresnes, in premises owned by the abbey on the banks of the Seine. At the time, Suresnes was linked spiritually to Puteaux (parish of Saint-Leufroy) and administratively to La Celle-Saint-Cloud.

Financially, its inhabitants remained destitute and bore crushing burdens, with the syndic trying in vain over the following centuries to challenge the religious tax. However, in a decree issued in September 1406, Charles VI, King of France, eased these burdens, noting the “such degree of poverty and indigence” of the Suresnois. Other sources from the late Middle Ages mention various controversies and conflicts linked to taxation and the use of the communal oven. The end of the Hundred Years' War was synonymous with ruin, pillage, and wasteland in the Paris region, with René Sordes noting that “Suresnes, surrounded as it was, could not be spared.” Once the war was over, the village returned to its wine-growing vocation. The winegrowers also devoted themselves to growing cereals and fodder (wheat, oats, and hay), useful for paying royalties and various taxes.

=== 15th and 16th centuries ===
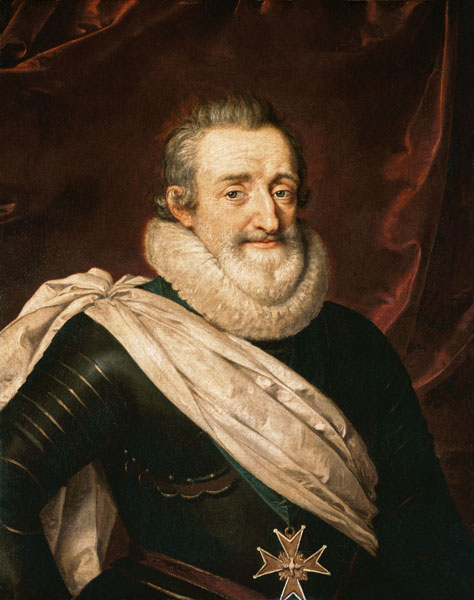
King Henry IV, who legend associates with Suresnes: he is said to have come there because he was attracted to its wine and to the young Gabrielle d'Estrées, who became his mistress.

At the end of the 15th century, the abbey of Saint-Germain found itself in a difficult position, with its administration undergoing numerous crises that affected the management of the Suresnes provost's office, even leading to the usurpation of posts. On June 8, 1575, the Benedictines of the Abbey finally took control of the provostry, putting an end to what had been a priory for some time. Suresnes had 350 inhabitants in 1460, rising to 500 by the end of the century.

During the Wars of Religion, the abbots of Saint-Germain-des-Prés paid little heed to the miserable conditions of the Suresnes winegrowers, who were victims of looting in particular, and the village had to defend itself on its own. In 1569, a protective wall was finally built, with seven gates and three posterns. Once peace had returned, these walls - which had become useless - were sometimes moved or destroyed: the Puteaux gate was demolished in 1788, the Dessus-l'Eau gate in 1818, and the last gate, towards Saint-Cloud, in 1906. Although vineyards still dominated in Suresnes, sainfoin, and peas were also beginning to be grown, as were cherry trees (as evidenced by the name of rue de la Cerisaie) and apple trees on the northern plateau. A text from 1710 also indicates that barley was being grown in Suresnes, in response to demand that may have come from Parisian breweries.

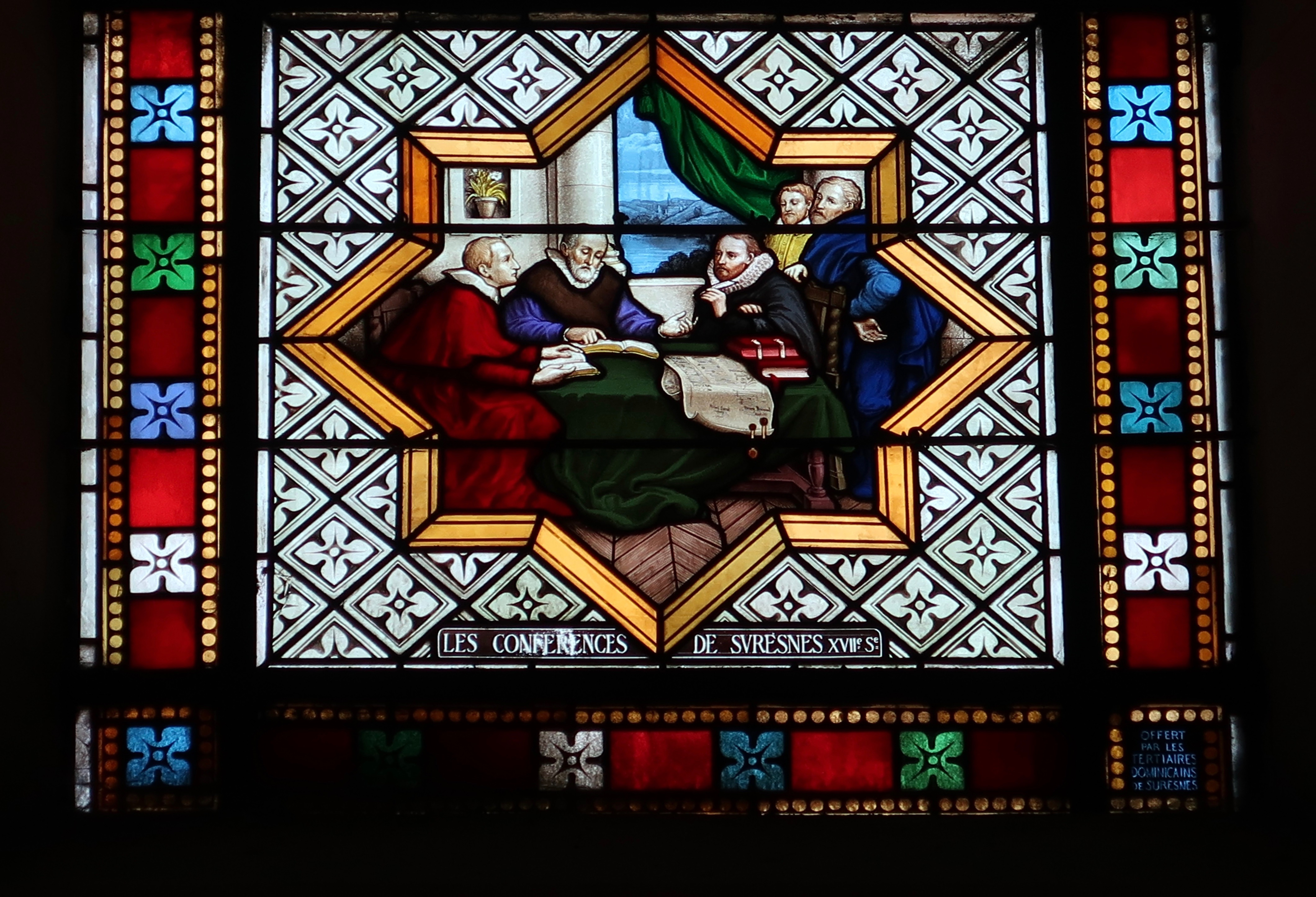
Stained glass window in the church of the Immaculate Heart of Mary depicting the Suresnes conferences.

On October 14, 1590, clashes broke out in Suresnes. Jean de Poutrincourt, a Ligueur, had come to the village to supply wine to the army of the Sieur du Maine. Henri de Navarre (the future Henri IV) sent a large force to Suresnes, forcing Poutrincourt's soldiers to take refuge in the church, where fighting ensued, and the church was burnt to the ground. Suresnes, a small village able to house many people, was chosen after the conflict to host a peace conference. This took place between the end of April and the end of May 1593, under military guard and presided over by the Archbishop of Bourges. On May 8, Henri IV wrote to the Duke of Mayenne: "I have resolved to move away from Paris because of the Conference and to go to Senlis and Compiègne during the Conference, which is being held in the village of Surèsne. It prepares Henri's abjuration to Protestantism. For René Sordes, it was “the only event in history to bear the name” of Suresnes. The conference took place on a property between Rue de la Seine and Rue de Saint-Cloud, the site of the future Château de la Source, where the Coty factory was built in the early 20th century. In Paris, Rue de Surène may have been named in tribute to this event.

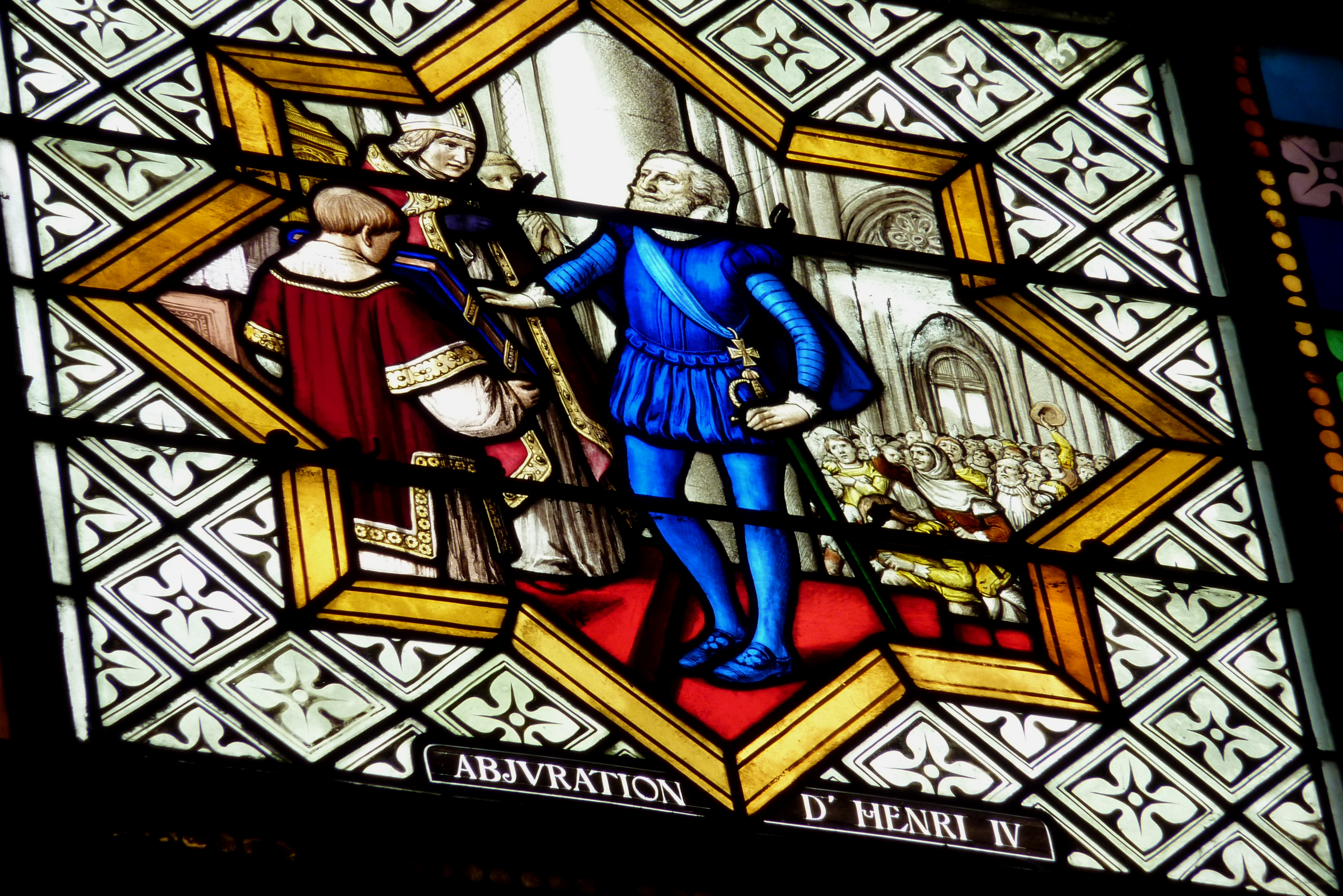
Stained glass window in the Church of the Immaculate Heart of Mary depicting Henry IV abjuring Protestantism.

A local legend has it that Henri IV owned property in Suresnes and liked to come here to rest, linking the king's memory to love and wine; he is also said to have climbed Mont Valérien to meet a hermit who predicted his tragic death. These stories are unfounded but persist in the collective memory. As proof of this, in 1816, at the start of the Restoration, Place de la Croix was renamed Place Henri-IV, while the neighboring Quai was renamed Quai de Bourbon. (Note: Became Quai Gallieni in 1916, after having been Quai Royal in 1846, Quai Impérial in 1855 and Quai de Suresnes in 1873.) A parallel legend has it that Gabrielle d'Estrées also lived in Suresnes, secretly meeting King Henri around the "old well of love"; however, there is no documentary evidence of this.

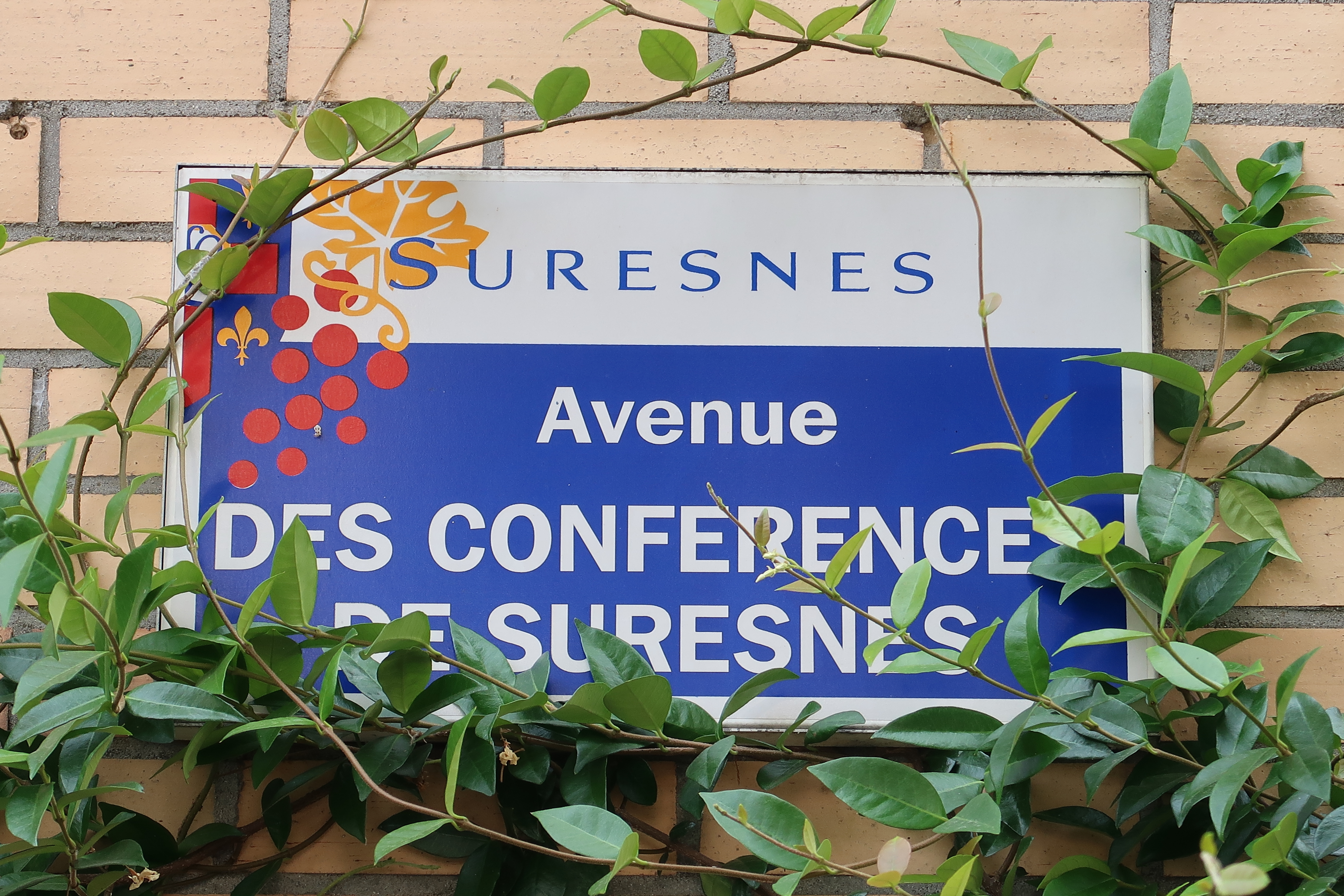
Plaque on the Avenue des Conférences-de-Suresnes, named in 1926 in homage to the negotiation conferences that contributed to the conclusion of peace between Catholics and Protestants.

The existence of this well is attested as far back as the 15th century; it was a meeting place for young boys and girls, who drew water and took oaths of love. Members of the d'Estrées family owned a house in Suresnes, but only in the 18th century. In tribute to this history, a guinguette was renamed “À la Belle Gabrielle” in the 19th century, featuring a fresco by Paul Chocat in the dining room, depicting the king wooing the young woman. Avenue de la Belle-Gabrielle, for its part, recalls the memory of this establishment, now destroyed, which played on this episode to attract customers, as evidenced by a poster preserved in the Musée de Suresnes, featuring a young girl and captioned as follows: “He loves me because he takes me to dinner at La Belle Gabrielle.”

On July 8, 1524, François Vatable was appointed parish priest of Suresnes. He inaugurated the writing of baptismal and marriage registers in French. In 1530, he was appointed professor of Hebrew by François I, then superior of the Abbey of Bellozane in 1543, before he died in 1547. In the 16th century, Suresnes saw little development, even though a growing number of Parisian personalities, attracted by its pastoral atmosphere, the charm of the Seine, and proximity to Paris, acquired property here, including vineyards.

== 17th century ==
=== Wealthy estates and famous owners ===
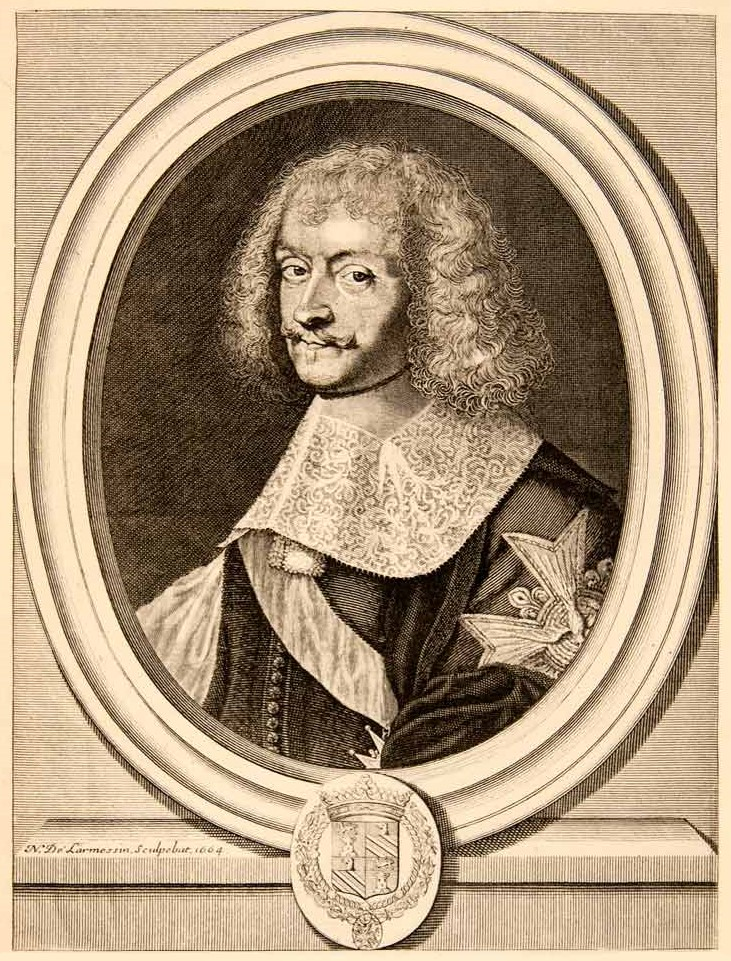
Minister Hugues de Lionne was a landowner in Suresnes.

In terms of urban layout, Suresnes has always been structured around two roads running parallel to the Seine, delimiting three groups of houses: The first to the south, with the church and the seigneurial house, the second with the communal oven, the presbytery and the school, and the third to the north; this historic Suresnes largely disappeared with the industrial and real estate construction of the 19th and 20th centuries (for example, the property of Étienne de Sain, attorney to the Parliament, which was located at 24, rue de Verdun, near the town gate, and which was demolished after the Second World War to make way for modern buildings). Surrounding the modest winegrowers' village was a belt of bourgeois and aristocratic residences. In the 17th century, Suresnes had around 210 houses, 36 of which were estates with gardens and parks, 24 with stables, and 3 with stables.

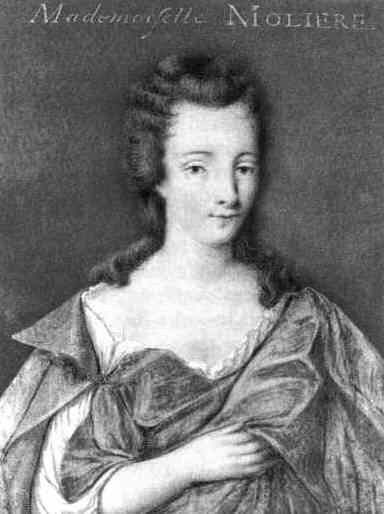
The actress Armande Béjart lived for some time in a house on Mont Valérien.

Between the 17th and 18th centuries, the high aristocracy built beautiful residences here: Louis II de La Trémoille, Duke of Noirmoutier, for example, owned a property located between rue du Pont, rue du Bac, rue des Bourets and the Seine; Nicolas Fouquet also considered acquiring a “rather pretty house in Suresnes,” shortly before his disgrace, and Hugues de Lionne then presumably became its owner, receiving the papal nuncio in 1662 or the Ottoman envoy Mustafa Feraga and his retinue in 1669. This episode may have inspired a scene in the film Angélique et le Roy (1966), supposedly set during the reign of Louis XIV, in which the Persian ambassador Batchiary Bey welcomes the heroine to Suresnes. However, the scene was not filmed there. In addition to the aristocracy and bourgeoisie, Parisian religious congregations had also long appreciated the hillsides of Suresnes, investments that ensured a good income, in kind or cash. Certain lands, however, gave rise to legal disputes between institutions, while the Saint-Germain monks continued to have problems with the local vicar and certain villagers. Other personalities linked to Suresnes at the time included actress Armande Béjart, who retired in 1675 with her granddaughter Esprit-Madeleine to a house on Mont Valérien. She later remarried and moved to Meudon.

One of the most famous properties in Suresnes is the “Château de Suresnes” or “Château de Bel-Air,” located between the rue de Saint-Cloud and the Seine. Originally, it was a simple place. The land was purchased in 1638 by André Bourret, the King's Treasurer, who transformed and enlarged the estate. During the Revolution, it was acquired by Étienne Clavière and then Paul Barras, who welcomed Napoléon Bonaparte and his wife Joséphine. The Princess of Vaudémont bought the estate in 1803, enlarging the site and creating an English-style park. Louis-Marc Chabrier, director of the Théâtre des Variétés in Paris, followed. In 1904, the Coty perfume company set up a factory in the northern part of the estate, on the site of the adjoining Château de la Source. The Château de Suresnes is also home to a foundation for neurotics, created in 1875 by physician Valentin Magnan, where Adèle Hugo was admitted as a patient after the death of her father. The Magnan Foundation remained in existence until 1975, when the château was sold to a real estate group. Disused, the château was demolished and the site subdivided, but the park was redeveloped and opened to the public in 1988 as "Parc du Château".

In 1647, the monks of Saint-Germain asked the King to clarify their property, to avoid the risks associated with confused inheritances and territorial mutations. In the second half of the 17th century, they also took it upon themselves to assemble the estate, manage it themselves, and receive the revenues, thus doing away with the practice of tenant farming. Between 1644 and 1693, several acquisitions were made to create a vast estate known as the "Clos des Seigneurs", stretching from today's rue Merlin-de-Thionville to Boulevard Washington. Its wine production was reserved for the aristocracy and important prelates. Sold as national property during the French Revolution, the land became known as sente des Seigneurs and was subdivided in the 19th century, notably with middle-class villas, after being cut through by the Paris-Versailles railway line in 1839: its lower part became the property of fashion designer Charles Frederick Worth, and later the Foch hospital.

=== Daily activities and links with the capital ===
To secure the surroundings of royal residences, King Louis XIV had Swiss Guards stationed in several towns around Paris, including Suresnes, which welcomed them in the early 1640s and would do so for the next century. According to René Sordes, Suresnes did not suffer from the deadly fighting of the Fronde, but the installation of Condé's army near the town, probably on the Fouilleuse plateau, must have led to requisitions. On the contrary, Francis Prévost, another historian of Suresnes, asserts that the village was devastated and pillaged, in particular the vineyards and the seigniorial house.

At the time, the two centers of activity in Suresnes were the Saint-Leufroy church and the provost's office (or seigneury). The former had been remodeled several times and therefore offered little of artistic interest, apart from two stained-glass windows depicting the arms of Saint-Germain-des-Prés and those of the king, and a more modest one dedicated to Saint Leufroy. The nave included seven chapels, which were the object of attention of the aristocracy and bourgeoisie, who paid to occupy them during ceremonies or sometimes to be buried in them. Since the 16th century, the parish priest had also been responsible for teaching the children of Suresnes. However, this instruction had to be simple and poorly attended, with parents complaining, for example, about the irregularity of the lessons given to their children. In 1683, 11 of the parish's 31 notables could not write.

The manor house (including gardens, prison, praetorium, stables, barn, wine press, dovecote, cellars, oratory, etc.) underwent several modifications over the centuries; it remained based at rue du Pont level, with the Hewittic company occupying part of the preserved buildings until they were demolished in 1974. The vaulted cellars of this building were used as a shelter during the Second World War. Patibular forks, owned by the abbey, were also used to punish many misdeeds: the murderers of a cart driver were condemned to death in 1648, with a scaffold erected in rue de la Barre (now rue du Pont); in 1657, two false moneylenders were "beaten and fustigated" at the crossroads of la Barre (between rue des Bourets and rue du Pont), with fleur-de-lis on their right shoulder, fined and banished from Suresnes for three years.

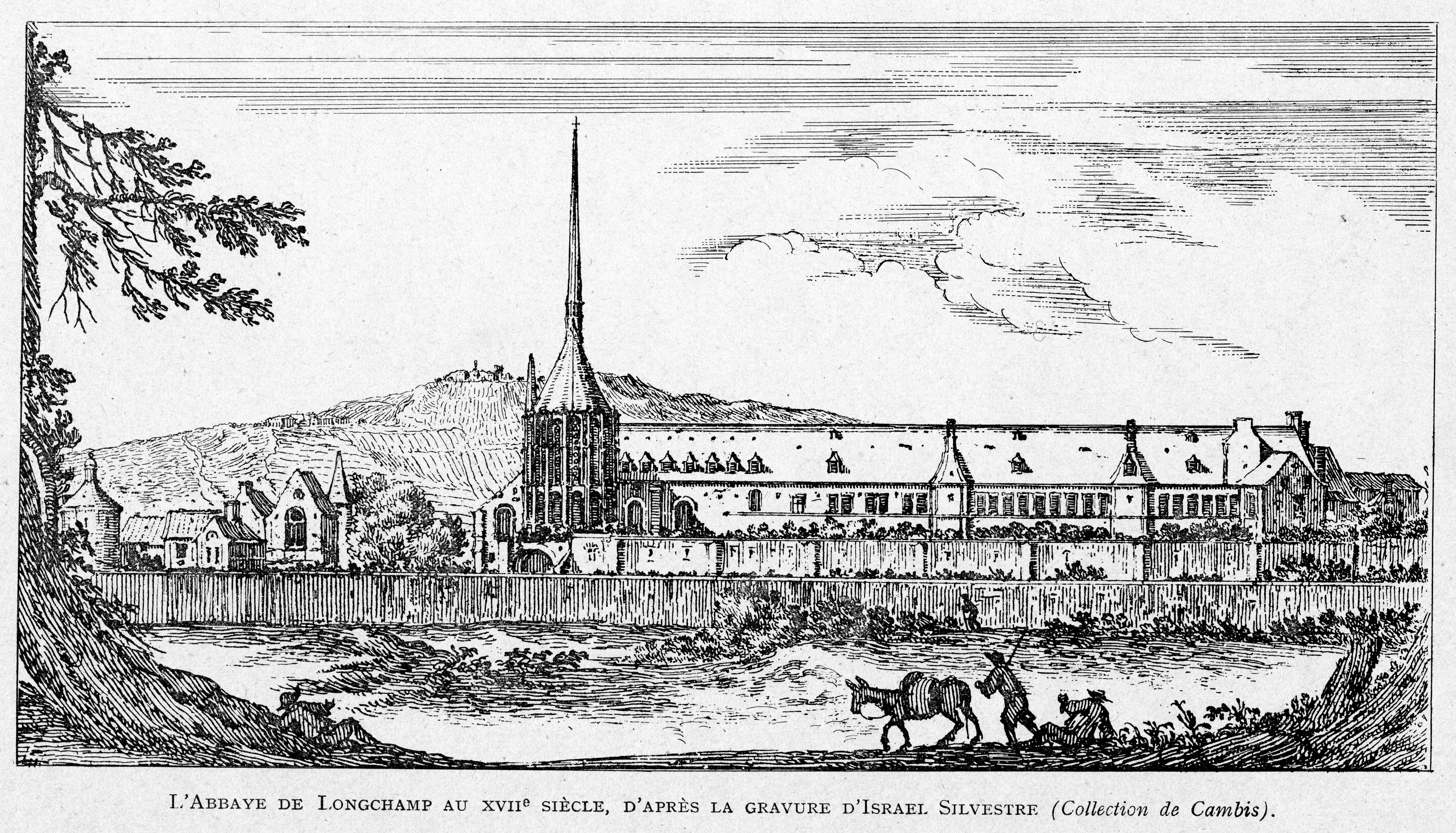
The Longchamp Abbey, located on the other side of the Seine, in the current Bois de Boulogne, maintained very close links with Suresnes (in the background, Mont Valérien).

As Mont Valérien has several springs, there are numerous wells in gardens, courtyards, and cellars, some of which are exploited. For example, Sieur Laporte (who owns a plot of land where the Fontaine du Tertre spring flows) is contractually obliged to deliver 530 liters of water daily to the seigneurial house. The second most important spring was the Vaux d'Or. Conflicts arose over the use of this water, notably with the nuns of the Royal Abbey of Longchamp, which was located on the other side of the Seine in what is now the Bois de Boulogne but owned several properties and vineyards in Suresnes. The Abbey of Saint-Denis, the Abbey of Saint-Victor, the House of the Dames de Saint-Cyr, and the Hôtel-Dieu de Paris also owned land in the village, which enabled them to levy fees until the French Revolution.

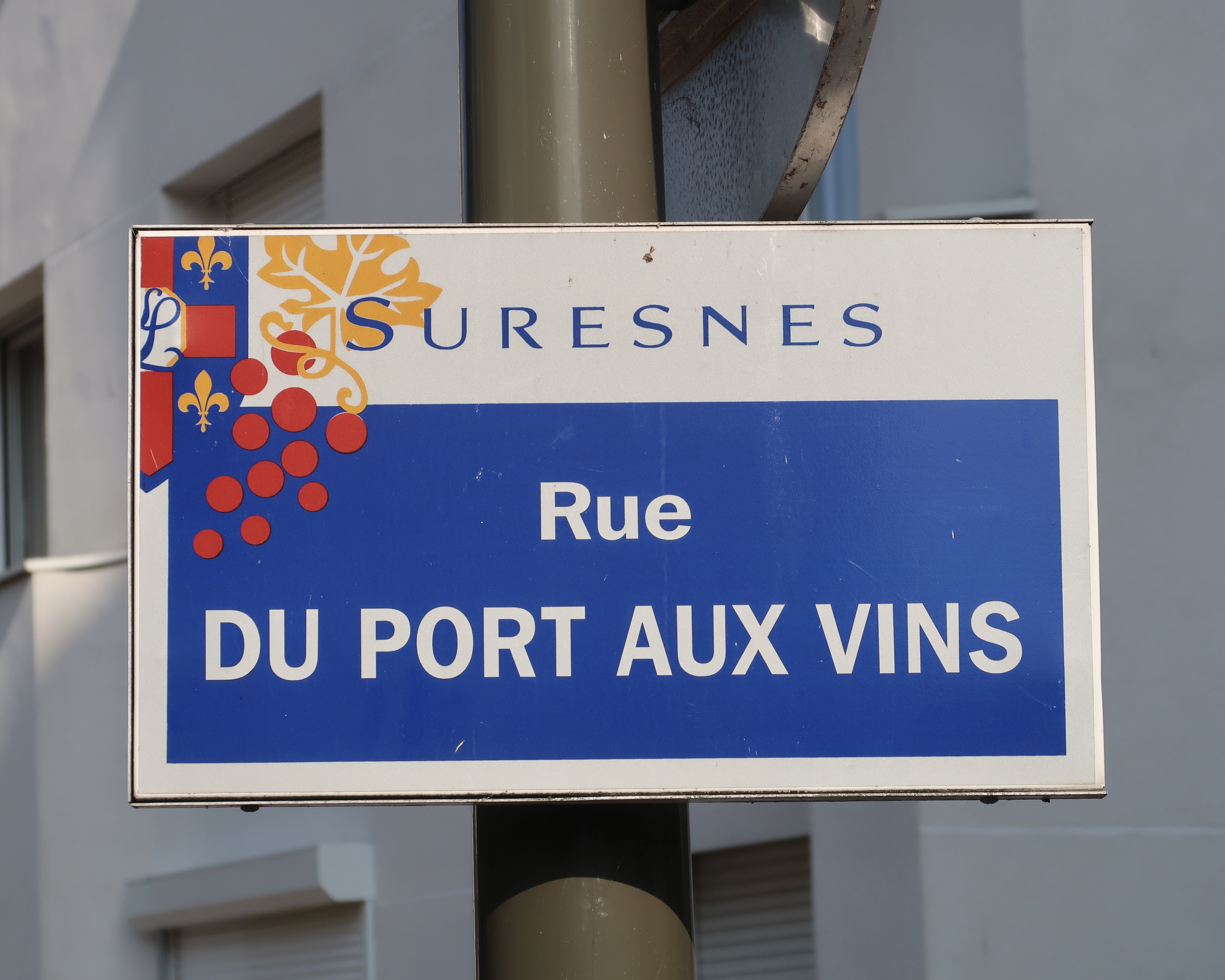
Plaque for Rue du Port-aux-Vins, at the end of which winegrowers used to load their produce before it sailed towards Paris.

In 1691, 64 winegrowers declared that they owned property in Suresnes: they cultivated 20 hectares of vines and 1.5 hectares of arable land. 13 owned a house, 7 a half-house, 2 a third of a house, and 40 were tenants. There were also 51 bourgeois (of the robe or royal officers), who owned 40 hectares of vines (employing Breton or Picard laborers to do so), all of whom owned one or more houses, around 20 merchants (few but representing all the guilds), around ten commensaux (servants of the royal family) and salpétriers (royal civil servants), giving a total of around 250 heads of household and around 1,150 inhabitants, as confirmed by the censuses of the following century. The “port aux vins” (wine port) enabled winegrowers to transport their production from Suresnes to the capital. As in Paris, the problem of waste and manure disposal was a recurring one.

Living in a modest village, the people of Suresnes led peaceful country lives, punctuated by a few family and Christian festivals. Saint Vincent, the patron saint of winegrowers, is particularly celebrated here. It takes place on January 22: the wooden press of Saint Vincent, kept each year by a different winegrower, is carried to the church and placed in front of the choir, before the start of mass. The winegrowers donate bread, which is then distributed to the public. A meal and a ball follow this. Every inhabitant had to have a framed engraving of the saint near the hearth. The Musée de Suresnes conserves one of these wine presses, dating from 1867.

=== The beginnings of the Mont Valérien pilgrimage ===
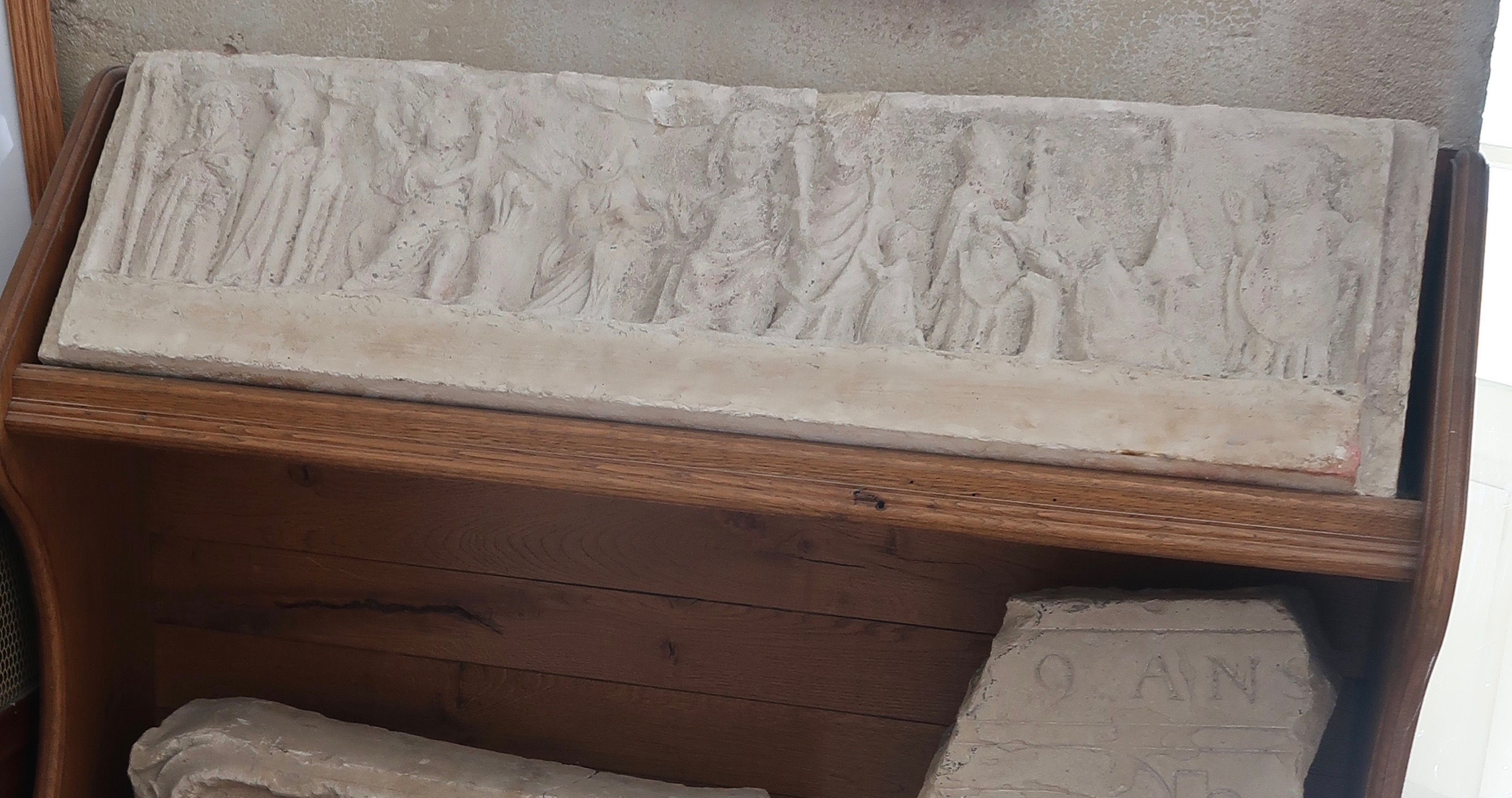
Cast of a bas-relief from the tomb of Guillemette Faussart at the Museum of Transmissions, in the fortress of Mont-Valérien. The original is kept at the Suresnes museum. A street also pays homage to the first female hermit of the mountain.

Jean Gerson, chancellor of the University of Paris, recounts that an anchorite, Antoine, was on the mountain and had a chapel built, dedicated to Notre-Dame-de-la-Bonne-Nouvelle, around 1400. The civil war between Armagnacs and Burgundians put an end to this cult. Guillemette Faussart took over the tradition. Orphaned when her fiancé was killed at the siege of Siena during the reign of Henri II, she retired as a hermit to Mont Valérien, where her family is buried. There, in 1556, she built the chapel of Saint-Sauveur (rebuilt in 1611) and died in 1561. Another local legend has it that Henri IV came to seek the advice of the mount's hermits. Pierre Séguin, a follower of Jean du Houssay, (Note: The latter, it is said, meditated in the trunk of a hollow tree and ate from a coffin-shaped trough. He also predicted the birth of Louis XIII and the death of Henry IV.) helped create the hermits' rule. However, their way of life was hardly formalized, mixing lay and religious, women and men, recluses and cenobites. This was the hermitage period. In February 1634, Louis XIII authorized the construction of a pilgrimage “to the three crosses” (calvary) on the mountain, near the chapel of Guillemette Faussart, and the hotel trade, while fairs, markets, and cabarets were prohibited to avoid any overflow. Suresnes wine merchants compensated for this censorship by offering drinks to pilgrims before and after their ascent. The Prince de Conti's generosity helped finance the work.

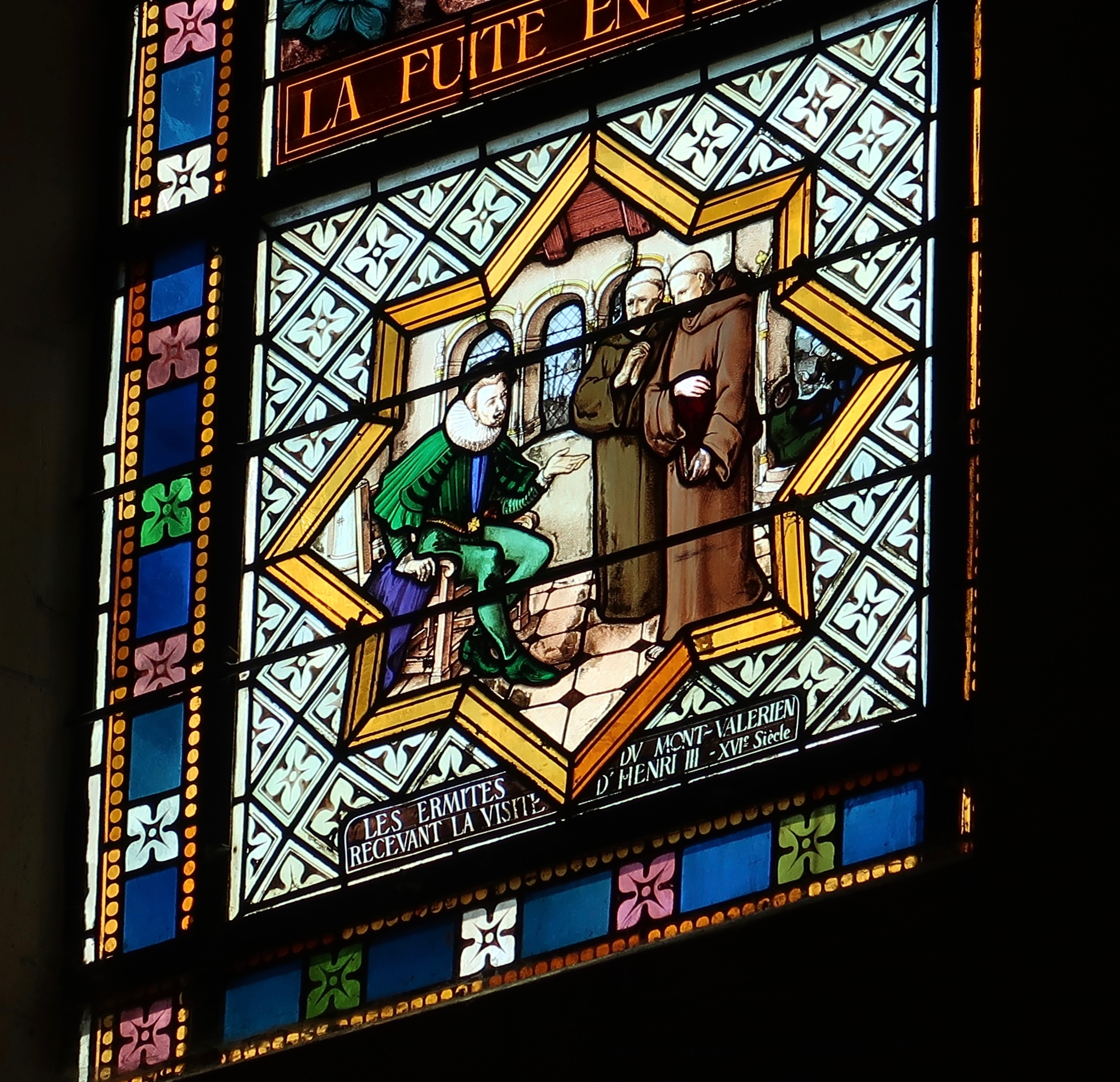
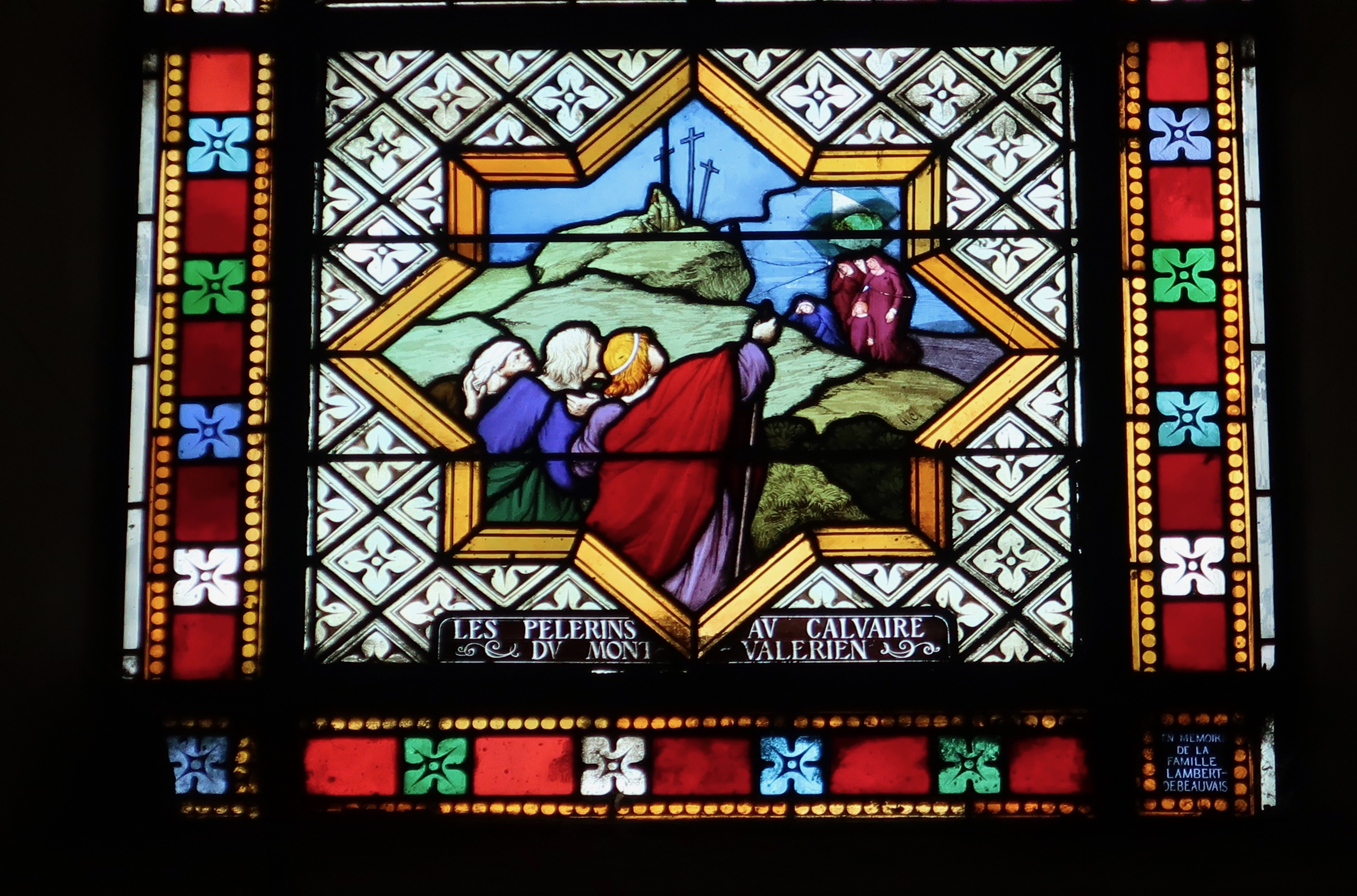
Stained glass windows in the Church of the Immaculate Heart of Mary, Suresnes, depicting King Henry III of France visiting the hermits (left) and pilgrims at the Mount Valérien calvary (right).

Founder of the Congregation of the Priests of Calvary (thirteen clergymen following strict rules) with the authorization of the King and the Archbishop of Paris Jean-François de Gondi, theology professor Hubert Charpentier (to whom a street in Suresnes pays homage) built a monumental place of worship on the summit of the mountain (the Church of the Holy Cross), eleven chapels with statues depicting the Stations of the Cross along the way, and a house to house missionaries, who cohabited with the hermits already present. They created the Congregation du Calvaire, dependent on the chapter of Notre-Dame-de-Paris. To support themselves, the hermits made stockings and cultivated small gardens. In response to the influx of pilgrims, walls were built to create the “Clos des Ermites,” the memory of which has been preserved on a street in Suresnes ever since. In 1641, Anne of Austria commissioned a Suresnes man to create the Chemin du Calvaire, of which today's Rue du Calvaire is a remnant. (Note: Old Chemin des Carrosses.) From then on, Parisian pilgrims flocked to the site, passing through the Rouvray forest, Longchamp, and taking a ferry across the Seine. René Sordes notes that this pilgrimage was an important event that changed relations between Suresnes and Paris: “The era of Suresnes as a welcoming suburb of Paris had begun.” For historian Philippe Castagnetti, its popularity is due to its proximity to Paris, with the mountain representing a “Golgotha” near the capital (likened to Jerusalem), but also because it represents a religious response to the corruption of the big city and the risks of sedition against royalty that can develop there. He also compares Mount Valerian, or Mount Calvary, to the Italian sacri monti.

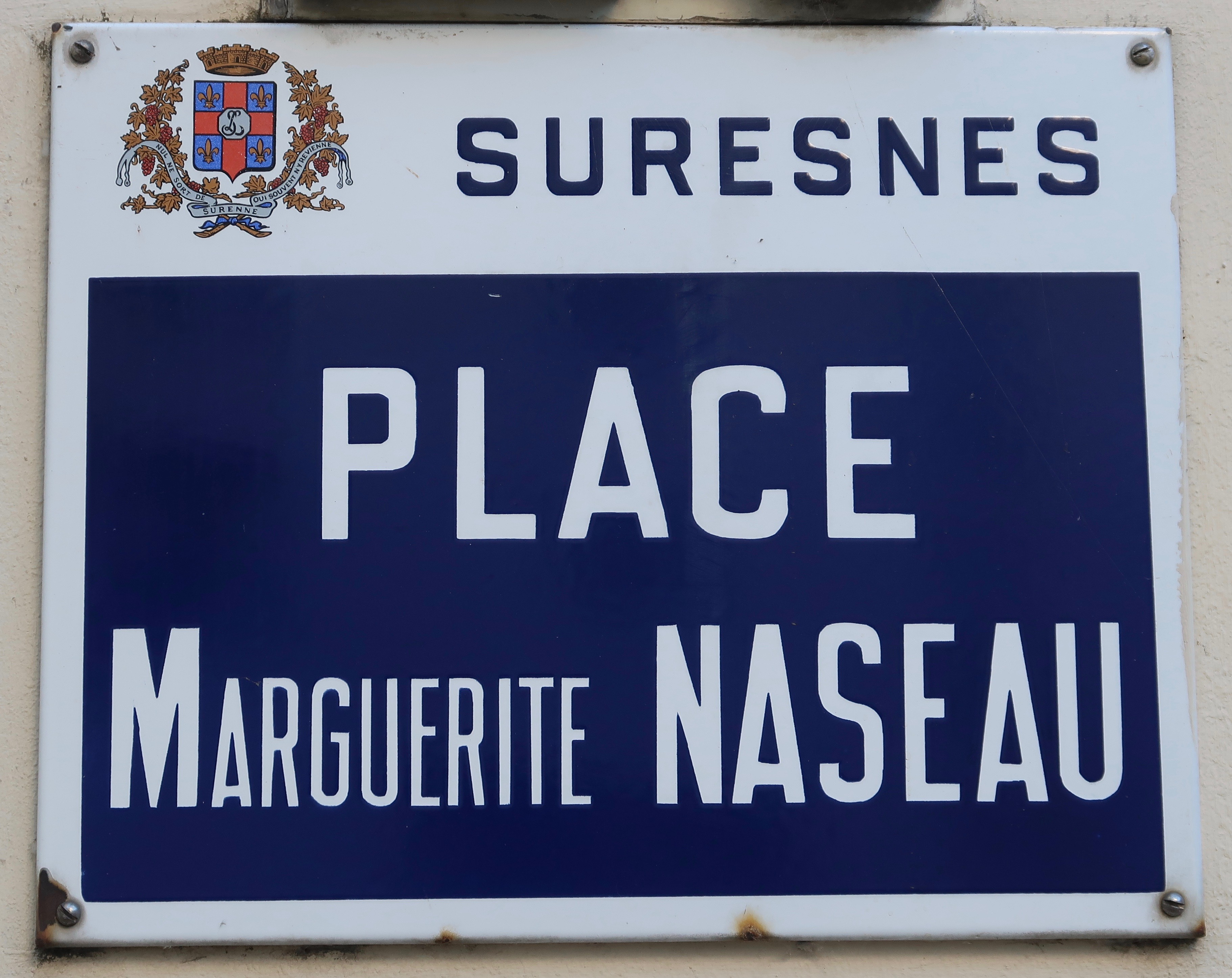
Plaque on Place Marguerite-Naseau, which commemorates the young nun raised in Suresnes.

Charpentier's death in 1650, however, led to a decline. Without asking the chapter's permission, the congregation sold its real estate to the Jacobin order. The chapter refused, sending new priests to occupy the mountain. The two movements clashed, resulting in injuries and two deaths. The Jacobins remained in place for some time, but after consulting Parliament, the King decided that the properties should be returned to the Chapter. Pilgrimages resumed, but many cabarets sprang up on the way to Calvary, leading to incidents so serious that Cardinal de Noailles, Archbishop of Paris, forbade priests of the Cross to open the pilgrimage on Good Friday night. In 1706, the Calvary acquired a relic of the True Cross, adding to the site's popularity. Over the centuries, many personalities, both famous and unknown, have followed this pilgrimage, stopping off at the Royal Abbey of Longchamp and taking the ferry, climbing the mountain on their knees for some, carrying a heavy cross for the most devout, and advancing by cart or donkey for others. Pilgrims included the literary Madame de La Fayette, Thomas Jefferson, then U.S. ambassador, (Note: After his ascent of the mountain, he returned to the village of Suresnes to attend the coronation of the rose queen.) and the philosopher Jean-Jacques Rousseau and the writer Bernardin de Saint-Pierre, who made the journey together.

As pilgrims came to Suresnes, the town's inhabitants also took part in pilgrimages. The town's museum holds a gouache on paper by Pierre Renard, Les chemins du calvaire, a naïve painting by a winegrower fascinated by the traditions of Suresnes, which shows the pilgrimage routes taken by the people of Suresnes to Val-Saint-Germain (Essonne), where there is a relic of Sainte-Julienne, then the secondary patron saint of Saint-Leufroy church. This pilgrimage against the plague originated in the 16th century and disappeared after the 1870 war. In the 19th century, during two major cholera epidemics, it was revived.

It was in this environment that Marguerite Naseau's vocation was born: raised in a poor Suresnes family, she became a collaborator of Vincent de Paul; a square in Suresnes bears her name.

== XVIIIth century ==
=== Religious life ===
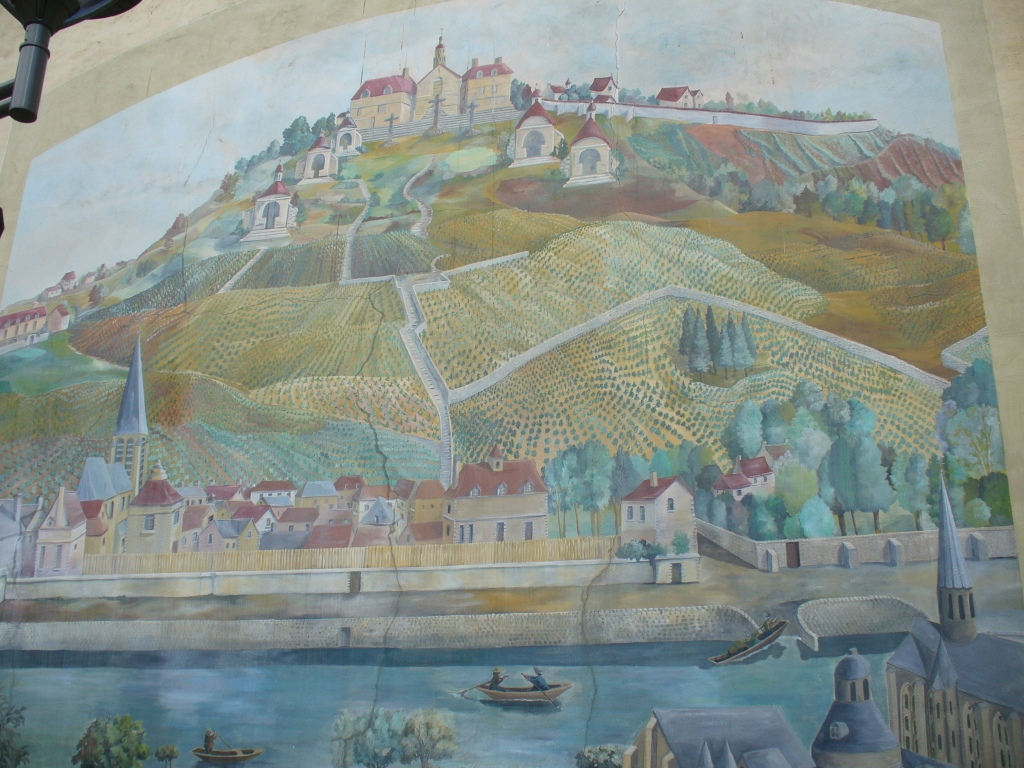
The pilgrimage to Calvary on Mont Valérien, fresco located on rue Desbassyns-de-Richemont, reproducing one of the oldest representations of Suresnes and Mont Valérien (1664), attributed to Israël Silvestre: we can make out the Longchamp abbey at the bottom right, the Saint-Leufroy church and the village of Suresnes at the bottom left and the Calvary, with the three crosses, on the mount.

In the 18th century, the monks of Saint-Germain, who had been under Benedictine rule since the previous century, continued to come to Suresnes only on solemn Christian feast days, when they would exceptionally conduct mass. They did, however, have access to the seigneurial house of the village, where they could stay at any time of the year, and where they certainly extended their stay: the food, however, must not have been famous, as evidenced by the expression of the time "à portion de Suresnes" ("a portion of Suresnes"). Several archives give an account of daily religious life in Suresnes, from bourgeois donations to the church and the parish priest's salary, to the establishment of fixed burial fees, with one priest lamenting that "it is unpleasant to be frustrated by inhabitants who go to cabarets to spend what they owe the parish priest". In the opinion of the sources, the wine-growing nature of the town was indeed a cause of dissipation among its inhabitants, so much so that the priest was obliged to renew regulations established in 1728, punishing with a fine those who drank wine, played cards or formed assemblies at mass time. However, the Suresnes hostelry not only welcomed drinkers, but also libertines - who were sometimes offered discreet rooms - as evoked by the title of one of the little blue books distributed throughout the country by peddlers at the time, La Femme mal conseillée et le mari prudent, or the guinguette de Suresnes, or these verses composed in 1696: "À l'autre bord de la Seine, Faisons rester les maris / Aucun fâcheux n'est admis / Dans les plaisirs de Surène".

During the 18th century, the ecclesiastics of Mont Valérien experienced financial difficulties, and the religious buildings were poorly maintained. In 1780, construction began on a staircase known as the "Hundred Steps". It served the various stations of the Stations of the Cross. Following the Revolution, the ruins of the Royal Abbey of Longchamp were also used to build the staircase. The original length was 150, but during construction work under the First Empire, a section was amputated.

The Saint-Leufroy church was renovated in 1760. Conflicts continued between the parish priests of Suresnes and the monks of Saint-Germain, the latter finally agreeing to cede certain honorary rights. The archives also record legal disputes between the people of Suresnes and the authorities (over judicial assizes, roads, and the communal oven), as well as between the community and private individuals (including contractors).

=== Urban development ===
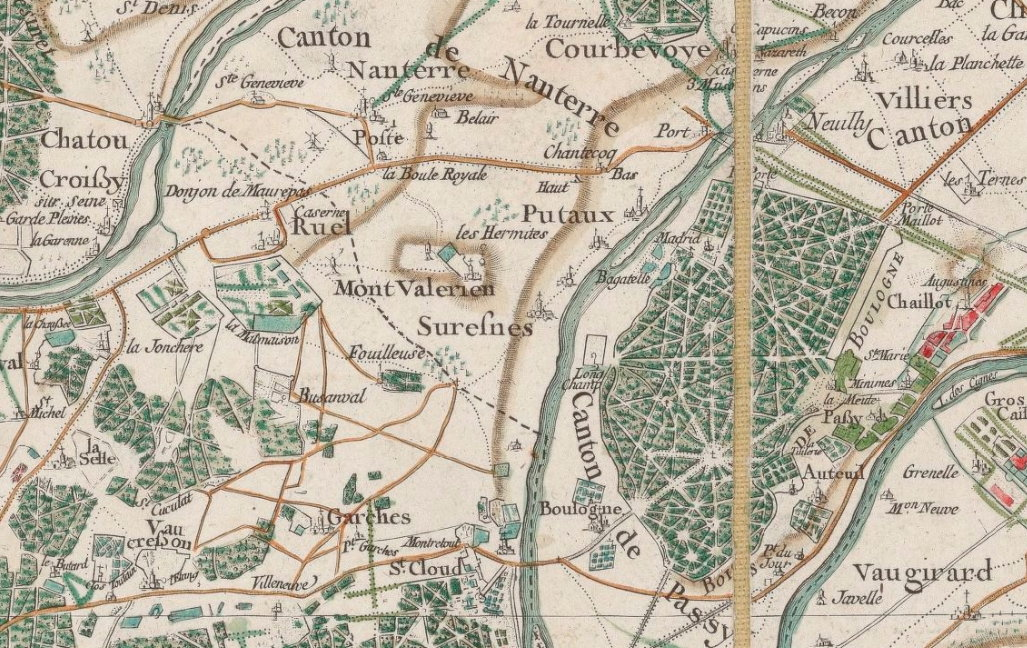
Suresnes and its surroundings on the Cassini map (1756).

In 1731, a cadastral map of Suresnes was drawn up at the request of the Abbey of Saint-Germain to review its property holdings. It has since been preserved in the National Archives. The village is still made up of three old districts with dirty, poorly maintained streets, surrounded by middle-class estates and, further out, aristocratic residences towards Saint-Cloud and Puteaux. The question of sanitation was therefore always problematic, even if in the 1780s some village houses had toilets with pits, and some interiors (of notables, winegrowers, or shopkeepers) had a certain level of comfort. However, living conditions and hygiene left much to be desired. The urban planning of the period set the tone for the future development of Suresnes, as the gardens of the middle-class residences would later become undeveloped land, making it possible to build the Jules-Ferry school and municipal warehouse (to the west), the boulevard Henri-Sellier (to the south) and the town hall and its annexes (to the north) at the end of the 19th century.

Each year, the urban community continues to elect its syndic, who is not very efficient given the arduous nature of the task, and who often leaves the problems he encounters to his successor. For several centuries, the village has owned meadows in the area of Puteaux, from which it sells its hay. This trade, in addition to the land it owns (particularly in Val d'Or), brings Suresnes a modest income. Still, it does enable it to maintain certain buildings at community expense (such as the presbytery and the school), guard the farmland, employ the carillonneur, and pay for the town's defense in trials in which it is involved.

Compared to the previous century, land ownership in Suresnes was changing: there was an increase in the number of winegrowers, the result of a new appropriation of the land, in a context where the bourgeoisie was now investing more of its money in speculative businesses to acquire more profits (e.g., Law's system) than in agricultural land, which was developing slowly. Like the merchants, the winegrowers lived in the town, more than half of them either renting or living in a home they did not own; on average, they had between four and five children, many of whom died in infancy, and they generally married within the community. Some families took in children from the bourgeoisie as foster children, but the mortality rate among these children was also high.

=== Daily life ===
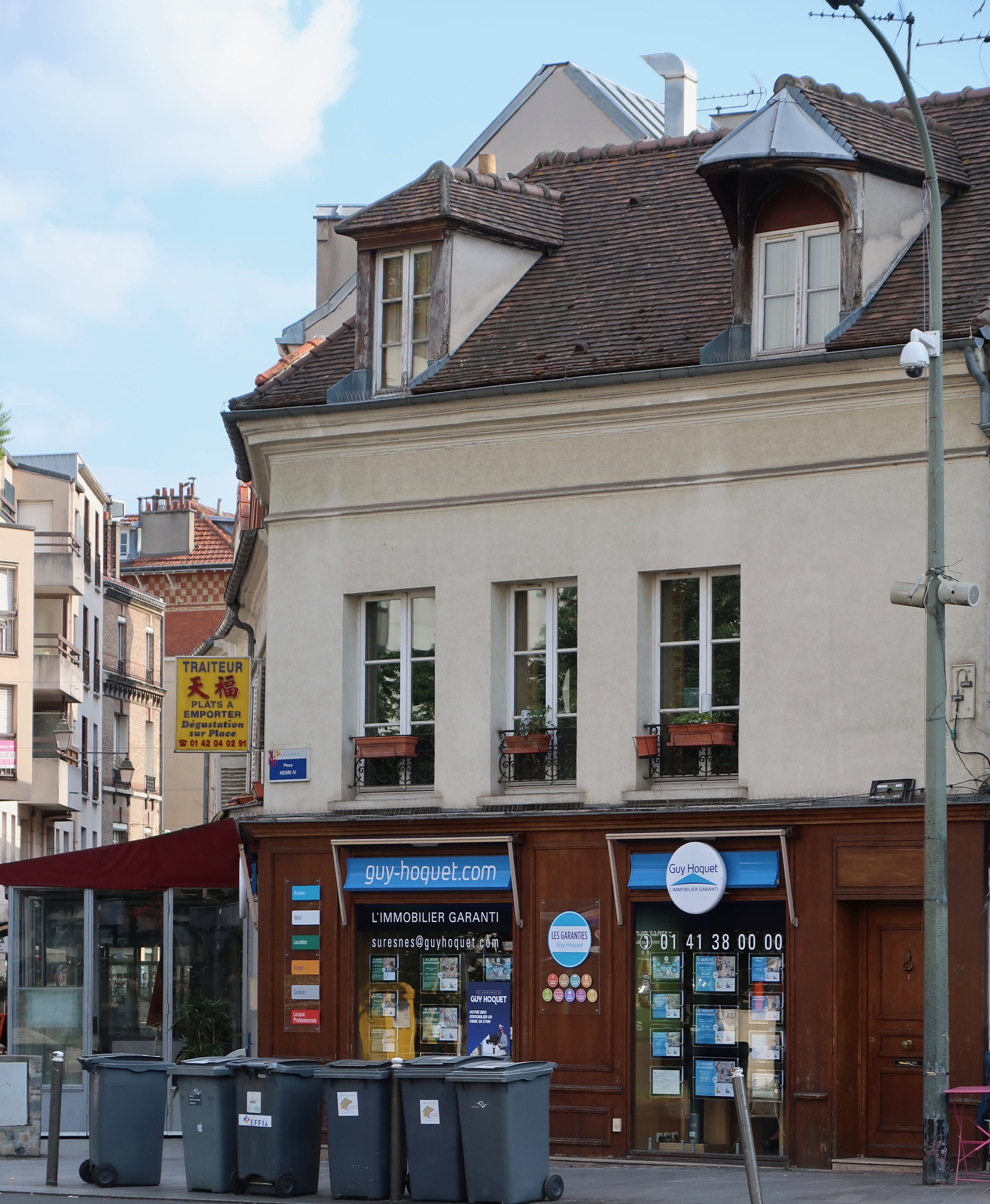
Rare 18th-century house to remain in Suresnes, Place Henri-IV. It notably has projecting dormer windows.

Despite bans on indecent behavior and dissolute living, the villagers of Suresnes enjoyed some distractions, notably on religious feast days and royal birthdays, as well as local games such as the boatmen's and fishermen's game: a cable was stretched across the Seine, with a goose hanging in the middle; a young Suresnois had to cut off the goose's head with his teeth, in full view of the public, at the risk of falling into the water. Jousting on boats also took place in Suresnes until the early 20th century.

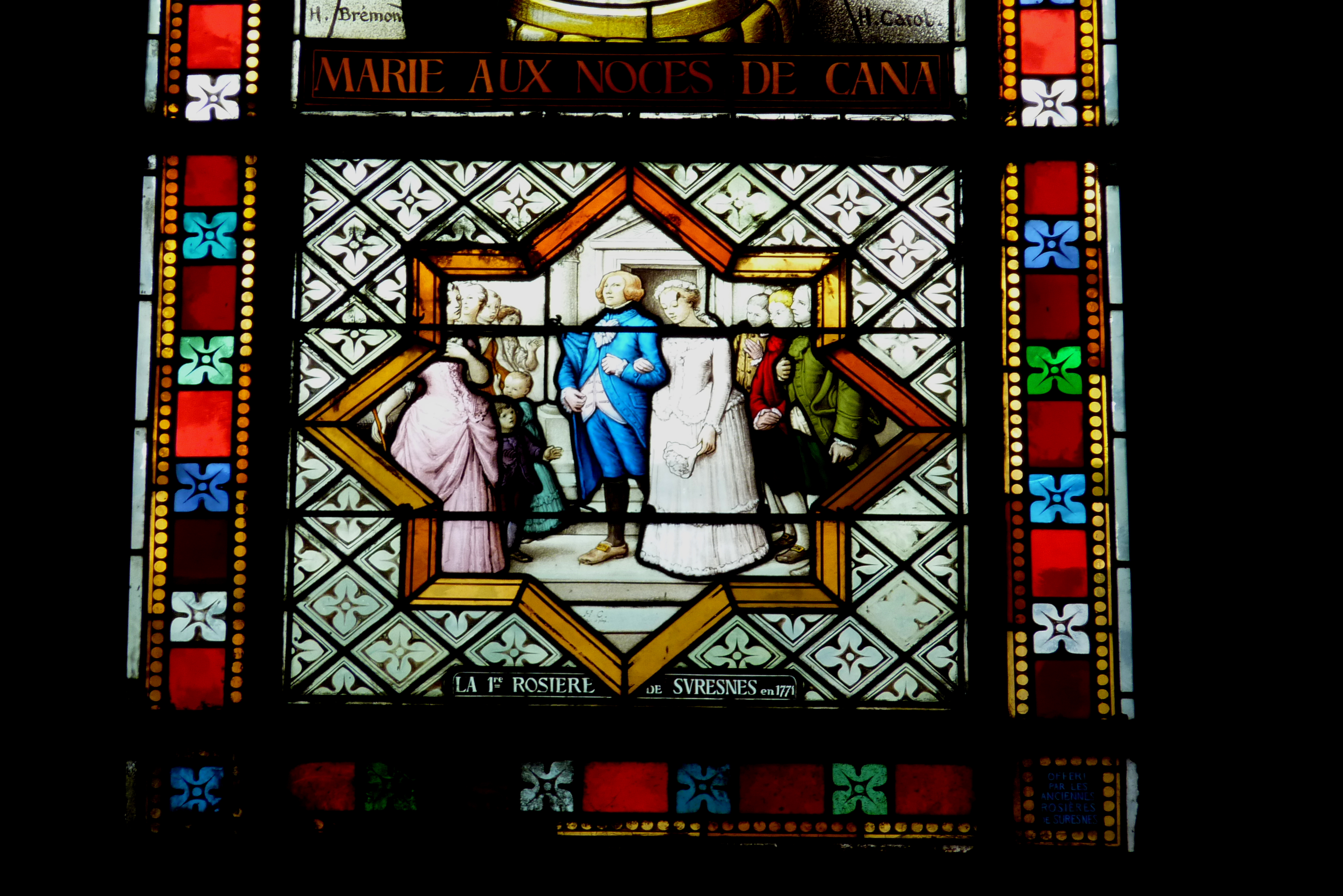
Stained glass window in the church of the Immaculate Heart of Mary depicting the rose gardener from 1771. (Note: However, sources indicate that the rose garden was created in 1777.)

The vineyards, around which social life is organized (particularly the grape harvest), are highly dependent on the seasons: the harsh winter of 1709, for example, led to their destruction, and everything had to be replanted. Although such disasters are rare, there are other recurring problems (birds, marauders, pilgrims crossing the vines to climb the calvary, etc.). In any case, the business grew thanks to the attraction of the guinguettes in Suresnes, linked to the influx of pilgrims, while cabaretiers also catered to the hotel trade. In addition to numerous wine merchants (particularly for establishments at the gateway to Paris), in 1766-1768, there were several shops. (Note: Two bakeries, two butchers, two pastry chefs, fishing activities, laundries, two master surgeons, a barber, as well as several construction companies (masons, carpenters, etc.).) Dependent on the provostship and viscounty of Paris, Suresnes was then located in an electoral area, with a royal officer (intendant) in charge. The syndic of Suresnes depended on the election of Corbeil.

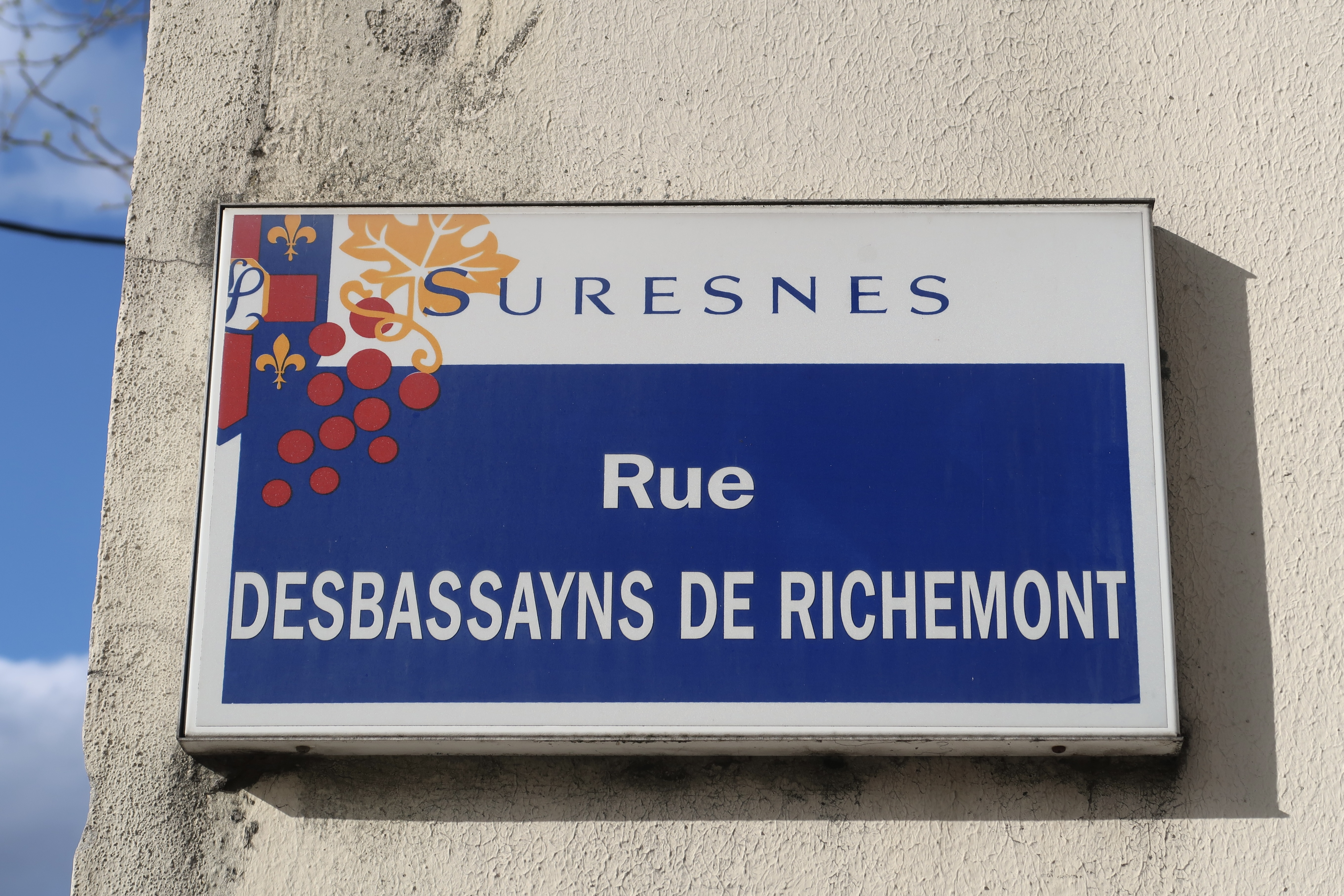
Plaque on Rue Desbassayns-de-Richemont, in homage to Count Philippe Panon Desbassayns and his wife Eglé Mourgue.

In 1711, the Duc de Chaulnes agreed to establish an annual annuity of 200 livres for the upkeep of a schoolmaster in Suresnes, in exchange for permission to extend his estate. Until then, only the parish priest had provided basic, even precarious, teaching. Subsequent regulations stipulated that parents were obliged to send their children to school and catechism classes up to the age of 14 and to pay some maintenance costs. However, it is likely that these rules were hardly ever followed, with the curate or mistress complaining of their lack of means. In 1784, the curate also complained about the promiscuity between the boys' and girls' schools, which had led to tensions. In 1788, new schools were built in the southern part of the Place du Marché and on Rue Émile-Zola. They remained in this building for a century, holding communal assemblies during the Revolution, then serving as the town hall and guardrooms until 1876, when they were demolished to make way for a market. Between 1768 and 1788, Suresnes had more businesses. (Note: Two bakers, two flour merchants, a grocer, two surgeons, a fishmonger, three coopers, two butchers, two vinegar makers, two pastry chefs, two midwives, a salt merchant, six shoemakers, a pork butcher, twenty launderers, three fishermen, a carter, two tailors and a wigmaker.) Despite its isolation, the village gradually became urbanized: in 1788, there were six contractors, fourteen masons, one stonemason, four carpenters, one painter, one carpenter, and two locksmiths, reflecting the need for workforce.

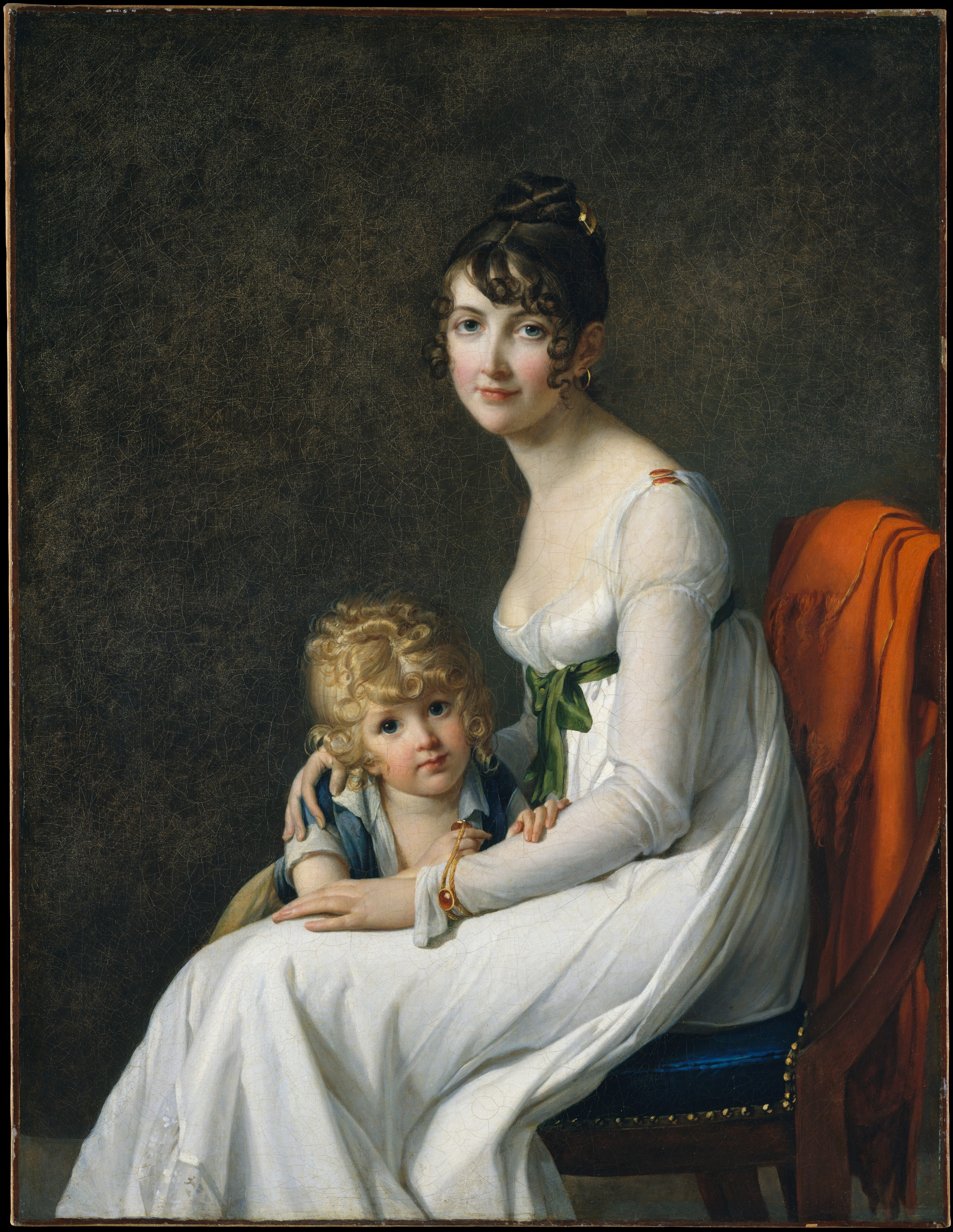
Eglé Mourgue, Countess Desbassayns, and her son Eugène. She reestablished the title of rose-queen of Suresnes.

Following the fashion of the time, influenced by the Encyclopedists and Jean-Jacques Rousseau, virtue prizes flourished in France, including the Rosière prize, created in Suresnes in 1777. Every year, a wise and virtuous young girl over 18 who was due to marry within the year was awarded the prize, thanks to donations from the wealthy Father Jean Benoit d'Hélyot. The coronation ceremony was a major event in village life, and the girl's family was honored, symbolically and financially, with a dowry. It was also a social day: the bride had to rent a place in the church, and a procession took place in the streets. In 1787, the ceremony was attended by the Comtesse d'Artois (Note: She states in particular: "Soon, no doubt, soon despite the too disastrous proximity of the capital, where morals are as far from virtue as from nature, this fortunate village will no longer be inhabited except by religion and modesty... People will come there from the profane city, to breathe the air of innocence." It should be noted, however, that the author makes an error in his book, by confusing Céline (daughter of the couple and born in 1804 died in 1887) with Camille (born in 1801 and died in the accident of 1804).) and the future Archbishop of Bourges, Monsieur de Puységur, then, after being interrupted by the Revolution, in 1808 by the daughter of the Duchesse d'Abrantès, Joséphine, who came with a hundred bourgeois and aristocratic friends (including Corvisart and Saint-Aulaire, as well as Russians and Poles), and in 1817 by the Duchesse de Berry, who arrived in a carriage drawn by eight white horses, and placed the winner's crown, made of flowers and fruit, on the head of a twenty-year-old Suresnois woman named Victoire Suzanne Anache. Suspended in 1793, the prize was revived in 1805 by Countess Desbassyns, in memory of her daughter Camille, who had died in a carriage accident a year earlier. She wanted to thank the people of Suresnes who had supported her through her ordeal and to perpetuate the memory of her child. The rosières are now elected every Sunday before the anniversary of her death. After the First World War, a patronage committee supported by the town council was set up to replace the Countess's dowry, which had become insufficient. The institution of the rosière still exists in the mid-2010s.

=== Bourgeois and aristocrats in Suresnes ===
The first perfumer to settle in Suresnes was Jean-Louis Fargeon, who supplied Queen Marie Antoinette. His property was located near where the Coty company established its factory in the early 20th century. After the Revolution, the Fargeon perfumery (on rue du Roule) was bought by Jean-Baptiste Gellé, supplier to the Duchess of Berry. Among the personalities associated with Suresnes at the time were Antoine François Fremin, a lawyer at Parliament and director of the Saint-Louis glassworks, and Jean-Rodolphe Perronet, a Suresnes-born engineer who designed the Neuilly bridge and founded the École nationale des ponts et chaussées. In 1858, a street was dedicated to him. A statue of him was even erected, the oldest in Suresnes, but it has not been preserved; it was a plaster model of another statue of the engineer on the Île de Puteaux. Around 1786, “bourgeois de Suresnes” appeared in the catholicity books, and several personalities called themselves “bourgeois de Suresnes.”

Unlike the bourgeoisie, who were able to maintain relations with the inhabitants of Suresnes, the aristocracy, whose residences were far away, were much more aloof. The archives preserve the memory of a trial between two powerful lords, the Duc de Gramont, Antoine de Guiche, and the Duc de Chaulnes, Louis d'Albert d'Ailly, captain of the king's guard, over the delimitation of their properties. Other aristocrats to own property in Suresnes include the Colbert family, the de Frileuse family, the Count of Middelbourg Baltazar de Gand, Camille de Grimaldi de Monaco, the Princess of Isenghien Pauline de Gand de Mérode de Montmorency and the son of Louis XV and the Demoiselle de Romans, Monseigneur de Bourbon.

Large estates were built in Suresnes during the 18th century, such as the Château des Landes, surrounded by vineyards and located on the site of today's Parc des Landes, on the southern plateau along the hillsides. It was built by the aristocrat Lechat-Deslandes in 1781, the distortion of his name leading to the name Château Deslandes and then Château des Landes. He lived there until 1786. In the following century, it became the property of Count Philippe Panon Desbassyn de Richemont and his wife Eglé Mourgue. The château was destroyed in 1870. Also remaining from another fine residence of the period are two reservoirs collecting water from the calvary, now located at the corner of rue du Feucheret and rue Guillaume-Lenoir, near the Suresnes-Mont-Valérien station, covered by the terrace of the property and used by the water company. Rue de Saint-Cloud, the Château de Bel-Air, was bought in 1788 by Étienne Clavière, future Minister of Finance, who entertained his political friends Jacques Pierre Brissot and Nicolas de Condorcet; he lived there until his arrest during the Revolution.

On the banks of the Seine
The Peace that victory brings
Comes back to our charming rooms
Happy inhabitants of Surène
You can taste the first fruits.

— L'Impromptu de Suresnes, performed before the Elector on May 21, 1713, on the subject of peace, which restored his States to him

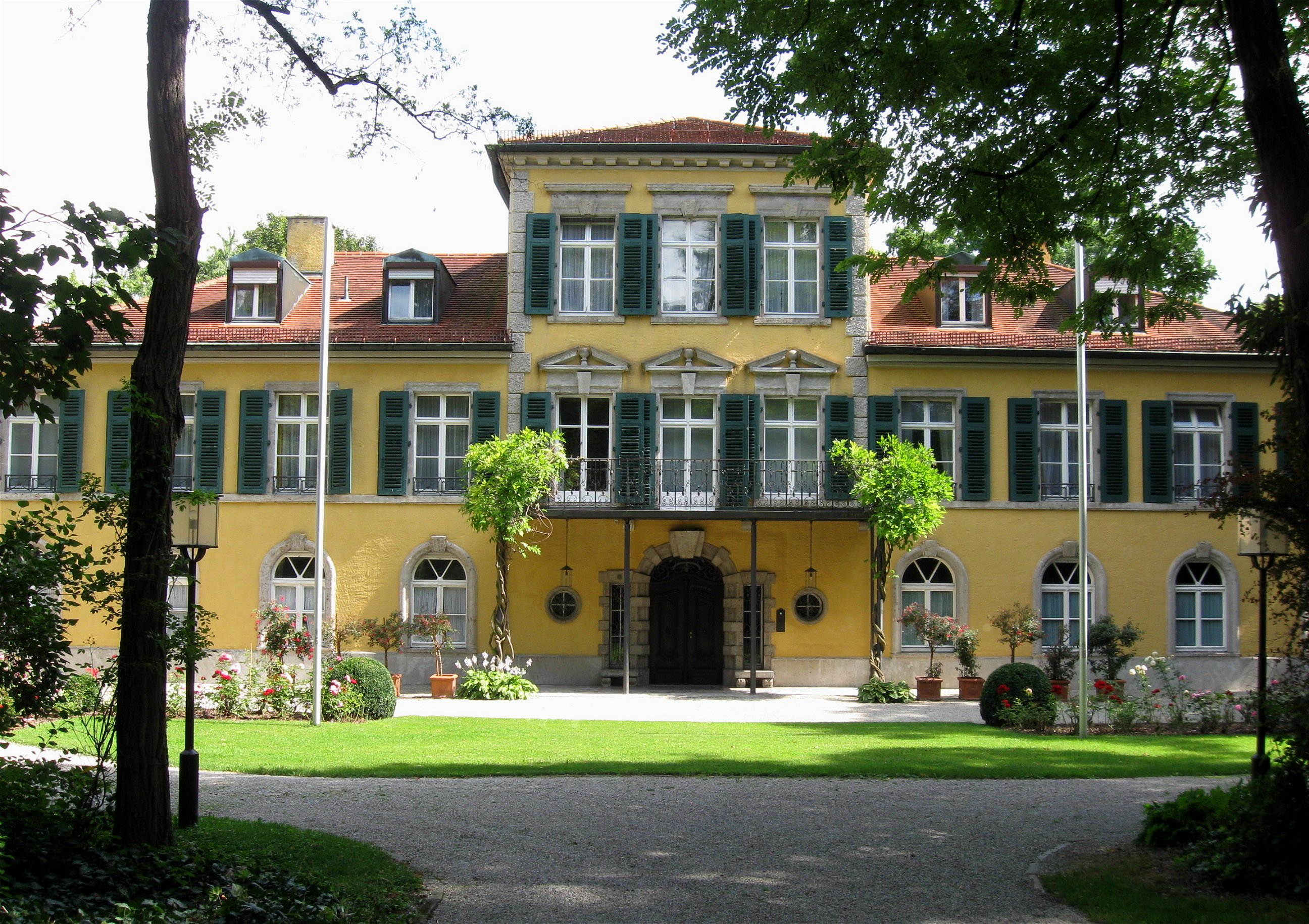
Suresnes Castle, near Munich, built after the stay of the Elector of Bavaria, great-uncle of King Louis XV, in Suresnes.

In 1713, the Elector of Bavaria Maximilien-Emmanuel spent a few months in Suresnes, giving parties in an estate (destroyed in a bombardment in 1870, but its ruins survived long afterward, at the entrance to rue du Calvaire in Saint-Cloud). Harpsichordist Élisabeth Jacquet de La Guerre (who, after her death, bequeathed her diamonds to the church of Saint-Leufroy) wrote the ballet La Musette ou les Bergers de Suresnes, which was performed before the Elector. Florent Carton, also called Dancourt, wrote the play L'Impromptu de Suresnes (1695) and later Les vendanges de Suresnes (1713), performed at the Comédie-Française. In 1636, Pierre du Ryer had already written Les vendanges de Surêne ("où les flots de la Seine / Vont arrousant les pieds des cousteaux de Surene"). The Elector's stay had a major impact on local memory: he gave and inaugurated a bell in Saint-Leufroy church, named Thérèse-Cunégonce (after his absent wife). In 1715, he returned to Bavaria, accompanied by his secretary Frantz Vilhem de Jarzt, who, in memory of this episode, had a castle built in the small village of Schwabing (near Munich), which he called “Suresne” (or Werneckschlößl), later incorporated into the Bavarian capital and used as an administrative building.

== French Revolution ==
=== Beginnings ===
In 1787, Louis XVI created communal assemblies, comprising members by right (seigneur, parish priest) and members elected by the inhabitants (nobles or commoners). This reform aroused criticism and resistance from all quarters, and the assemblies were given no additional financial resources. Suresnes was entitled to nine elected members, known as municipal officers. The town was part of the provincial assembly of Île-de-France, the department of Corbeil, and the arrondissement of Bourg-la-Reine. The elections were immediately contested in Suresnes, notably by the former syndics, and the Count of Clermont-Tonnerre had to come in person to have the ballot confirmed.

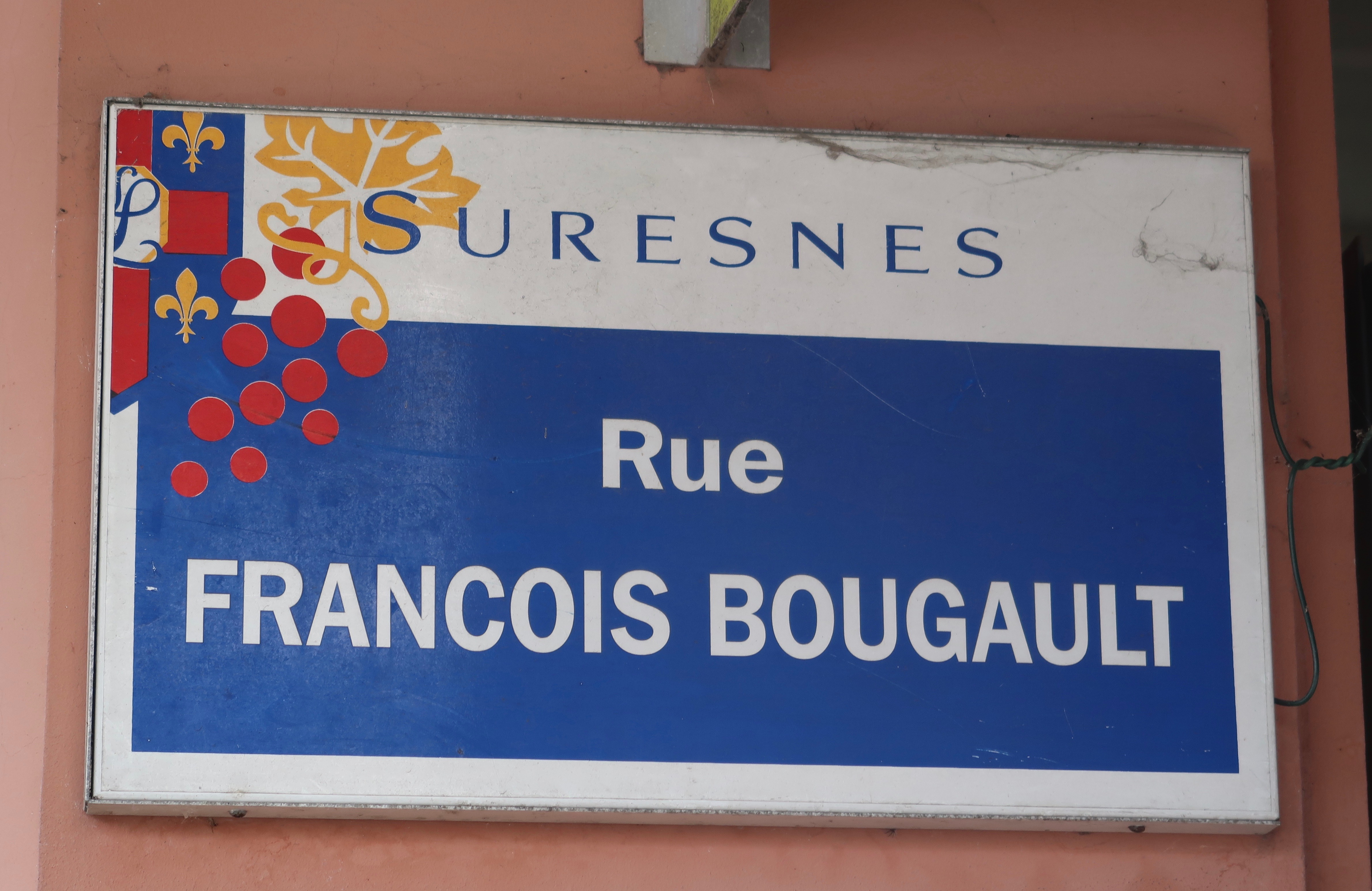
Plaque on rue François-Bougault, in homage to the first mayor of Suresnes.

On April 11, 1789, posters were posted in Suresnes, announcing the convening of the Estates General. The Suresnois' grievances are limited to a statement of the inhabitants' assets, i.e. only 582 arpents and 1 perch under cultivation, the total product of their properties amounting to 25,565 pounds, while the total of their communal charges is 50,976 pounds and 16 sols; their charges, therefore, exceed the product of their properties (a discrepancy they may have exaggerated), which is in line with similar protests observed in many villages concerning the overwhelming weight of taxes and the misery they engender. The Suresnois also demanded freedom from the shackles of banality, and from the abuses to which they were subjected (for example, they could sell or buy bread only on two days a week, and they criticized too many levels of jurisdiction in trials). Three notables from Suresnes (including Martin-François Bougault, who played an important role in the commune during this period) are appointed to elect deputies to the Estates General for the department of Paris.

On July 16, 1789, just as the "Great Fear" was beginning, the Suresnes municipal assembly decided to patrol the town all night, "because of the brigandage that is taking place in various parts of the kingdom, in connection with the constitutional revolutions", without however saying a word about the storming of the Bastille. The following day, it declared that the village gates would henceforth be guarded. On August 2, the council created a flag for Suresnes: a red cross with a white hexagon in the middle, bearing the letters S. L. (Saint-Leufroy), with four blue squares in the corners charged with a golden fleur-de-lys. Suresnes is inscribed at the top, "1789" at the bottom. The coat of arms was definitively adopted by the municipality in 1962. The flag is blessed on August 15. Eight military companies (initially without arms or uniforms) were also formed in the village, making Suresnes one of the first communes around the capital to set up a National Guard. Paris was short of weapons, so the village ordered some from the Charleville factory. The guard was then reorganized into four companies, and the decision was taken to affiliate it with the Paris National Guard. On October 25, a tricolor uniform was created, bearing the initials "S. L.".

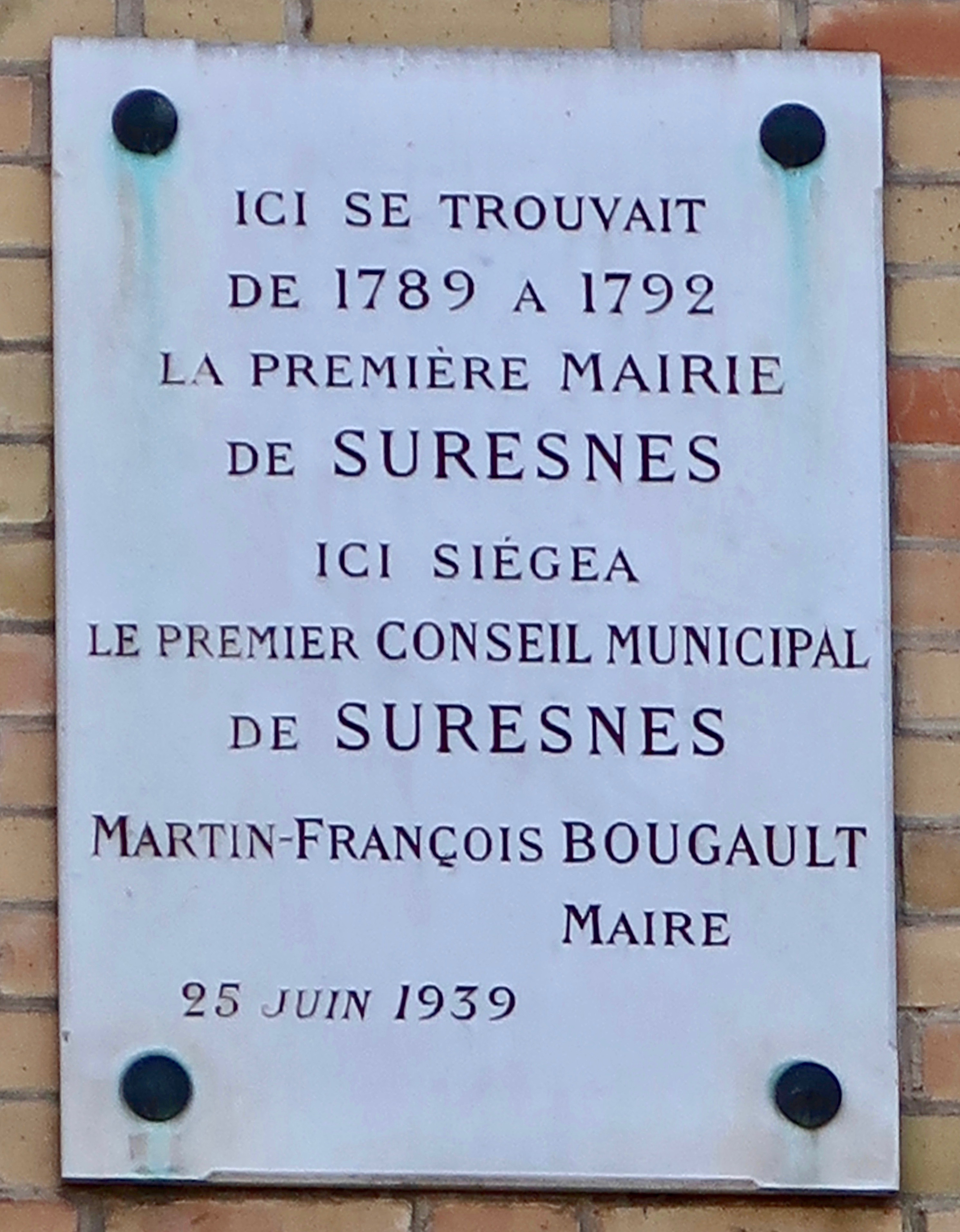
Plaque on the site of the first town hall of Suresnes.

With the provost's office soon to disappear, the first town hall took up residence until 1792 in a house on the corner of Rue du Moutier (Note: Current Rue Émile-Zola.) and Place de la Croix. (Note: Current Place Henri-IV.) The assemblies of 1787 were replaced in early 1790 by new ones, with six municipal officers and twelve notables (elected by just under 80 voters). On January 31, Bougault was elected mayor. On February 21, 1790, the municipal officers swore loyalty to the king, the nation, and the law in the Place de la Croix.

Revolutionary reforms led to the end of the Saint-Germain-des-Prés abbey's guardianship of Suresnes: its former possessions were later sold as national property to benefit the commune. Various owners, such as Deslandes and Lebeau, purchased the property. However, taxes, even when requested under the seal of civic-mindedness, remained a problem, with the Receveur des Finances complaining several times about the Suresnois' slowness to pay them. Privileges having been abolished, municipal officers took the place of the former lords in the pews reserved for them in the church, putting an end to what had caused a great deal of tension under the Ancien Régime.

On March 4, 1790, France was divided into departments. Suresnes became part of the Paris department, the arrondissement of Saint-Denis, and the canton of Nanterre. However, the boundaries of Suresnes and its neighboring communes were not yet fully fixed, as the municipality sought to eliminate certain territorial anomalies, perceived as injustices. The new boundary, which still did not include Mont Valérien, remained in place until 1850, when the fort was annexed to the commune.

Between 1790 and 1792, the municipal council paved the streets (on Place de la Croix, the future Place Henri-IV, a lead plaque was engraved: “First paving stone laid by Bougault, first mayor, 1790”), indicating the names of the roads and numbered the houses. The municipality also took over responsibility for the needy from the parish priest. A year later, to commemorate July 14, 1789, Bougault had a commemorative plaque installed on the Place de la Croix (it was broken on the night of August 17, without the culprit being identified). The coat of arms on the church pew was modified, with the Saint-Germain coat of arms replaced by the letters "S. L.", with a Phrygian cap on the crown. In mid-1790, the National Guard was reformed and clashed with the municipality.

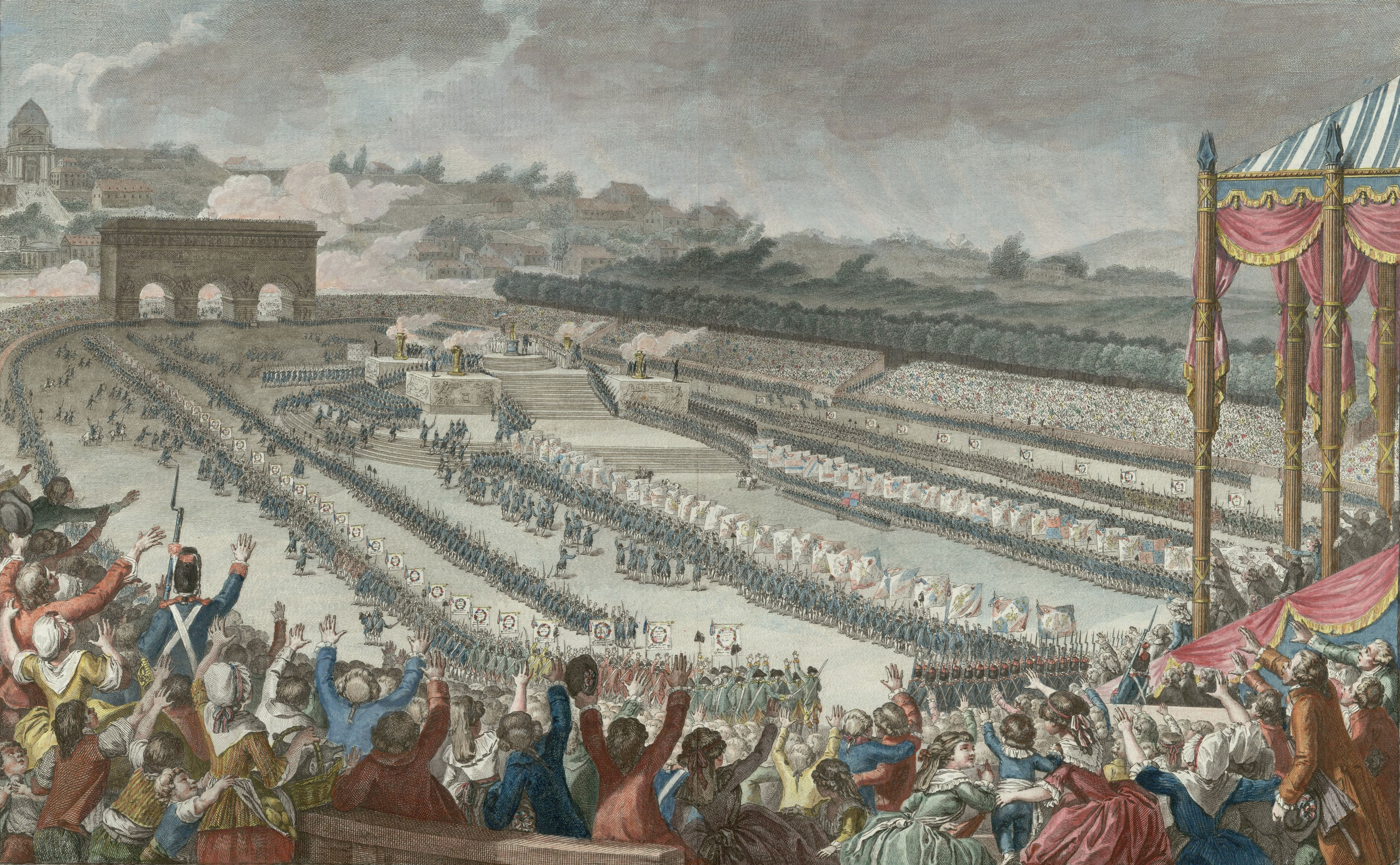
Engraving of the Fête de la Fédération held on July 14, 1790, in Paris, where part of the authorities of Suresnes went.

In relative calm, Suresnes lived through the events of the Revolution. On January 16, 1791, the town's parish priest took the oath of allegiance to the Republic. On March 27, to celebrate the restoration of the King, the municipal body and the National Guard attended the Te Deum in the church, with the cannons sounding several times. On April 12, a mass was celebrated for Mirabeau's death. On learning of the King's flight on June 21, Bougault was dismayed, placed the weapons under guard, and had suspicious persons arrested. On July 14, half the town council and guard went to the Champ-de-Mars for the Fête de la Fédération, while the other half organized a ceremony in the commune. The national property belonging to religious communities (land, buildings, etc.) was sold in two stages (for a total of 151,400 pounds), on September 22 and October 21, 1791, all buyers being Suresnois (the commune also made purchases, including the communal oven). The archives of the seigniorial house were transferred to Saint-Denis. In September 1791, following the proclamation of the Constitution, a Te Deum was sung in the church. On October 23, 1791, the prison and dungeon doors, the iron bars of the arrest chamber, and the justice post were moved to the cemetery, to bury the memory of the abbey symbolically.

Although popular, Bougault resigned and, on May 27, 1792, Marc-Antoine Breton was elected mayor. On August 28, the Assembly requisitioned 30,000 equipped men to fight on the frontiers; on September 3, 84 young Suresnois signed up. On August 10, the King is deposed, and on September 21, the Convention replaces the Assembly, and the Republic is proclaimed. On December 9, the municipality was ordered to place the National Guard on alert to monitor strangers in the village and carry out patrols. After the King's execution on January 21, 1793, the district of Saint-Denis asked the municipality to convene the commune's general council and make it sit permanently, also recommending an imposing public force and surveillance of the roads. On January 26, the municipality decided that it was necessary to acquire 200 pikes, pursuant to the authorization granted by the National Assembly the previous year, which allowed towns to distribute pikes to citizens able to bear arms. On April 21, the municipal officers became administrators of the parish's revenues, with the parish priest no longer having a say. On March 17, Pierre Lemoine was elected mayor, and his new municipal team was tasked with equipping the volunteers who joined the Franciade battalion and the Armée du Nord. Following the law of September 10, 1792, on April 11, 1793, the municipality took the objects of worship to the district, not without some delay. Also, after a delay, members of the district came to seize three surplus bells from the Saint-Leufroy church to produce iron, leaving only one. In 1792, Suresnes suffered a famine, going twenty days without bread.

In 1792, Pas-Saint-Maurice was annexed to the commune of Suresnes. The name comes from a legend according to which this saint left the trace of his foot on the curbstone of a well, while another version states that he circumscribed the boundaries of the town of Nanterre, of which he is the patron saint.

=== Terror ===
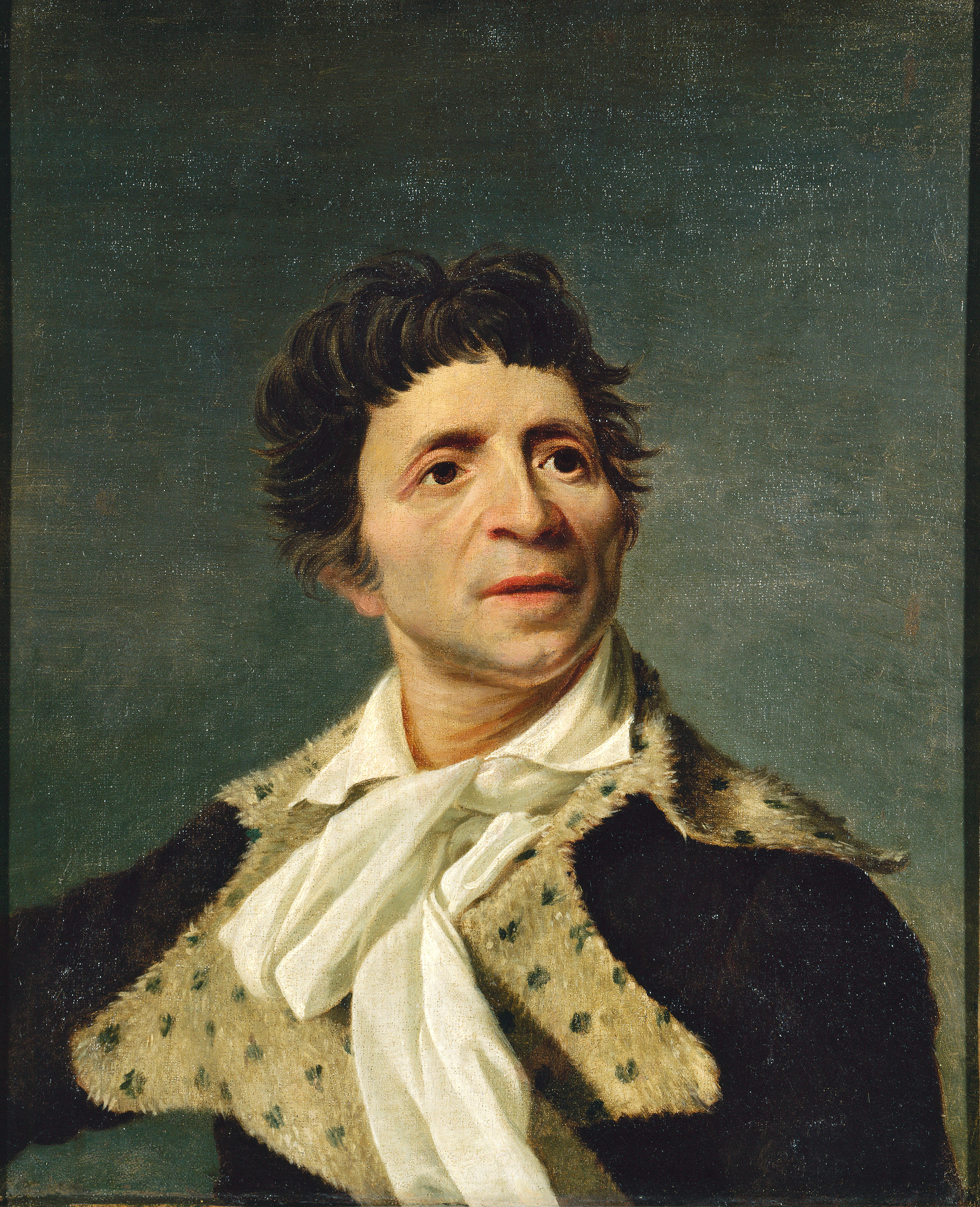
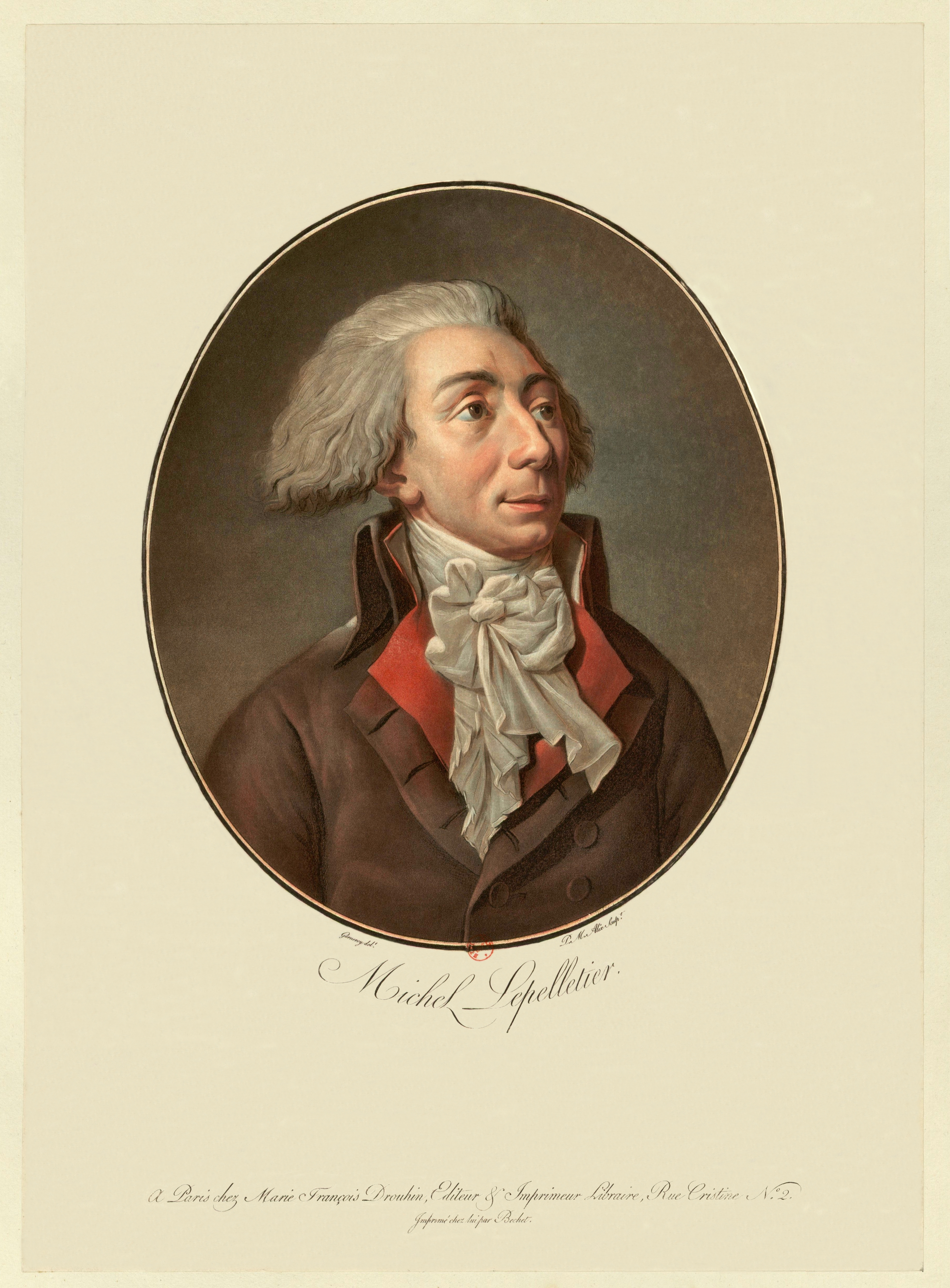
Left: Marat. Right: Lepeletier.
The municipality of Suresnes erected a monument in honor of these two figures of the Revolution, both assassinated in 1793.

With the Terror came the closing of the gates of Paris, making it difficult for Suresnois to travel to the capital. On August 11, 1793, Jean-Jacques Désiriez, who had recently moved to the village, created the Société Populaire de Suresnes. Affiliated with the Jacobin Club, it came to the aid of low-income families and those with enlisted soldiers, distributing allowances with the municipality. On October 6, under the law of March 21, 1793, citizens elected a surveillance committee, tasked with receiving declarations from foreigners residing in Suresnes and keeping an eye on them. The law of July 26, which obliges holders of goods to declare them to the municipalities to combat hoarders, leads the Suresnes winegrowers to sell their harvest at the price set by the administration and to deliver no more than four pieces to their resellers. An angry riot broke out on October 30.

With the life of priests becoming more complicated, the vicar of Saint-Leufroy renounced his ecclesiastical status on November 24. To remove all references to feudalism, and at the same time as some communes changed their names, streets in Suresnes were renamed: rue de Saint-Cloud became rue Brutus, rue Moutier became rue Marat, and rue du Calvaire became rue de la Montagne. Until the French Revolution, today's Place Henri-IV was divided into two areas: its eastern part was called Place du Hansy, from the German “Hanse,” about the water merchant's society, probably a meeting place for Suresnes boatmen; it was renamed Place de la Liberté. In 1793, it was renamed Place de Montagne, as a monument had been erected there to the Montagnards Marat and Lepeletier.

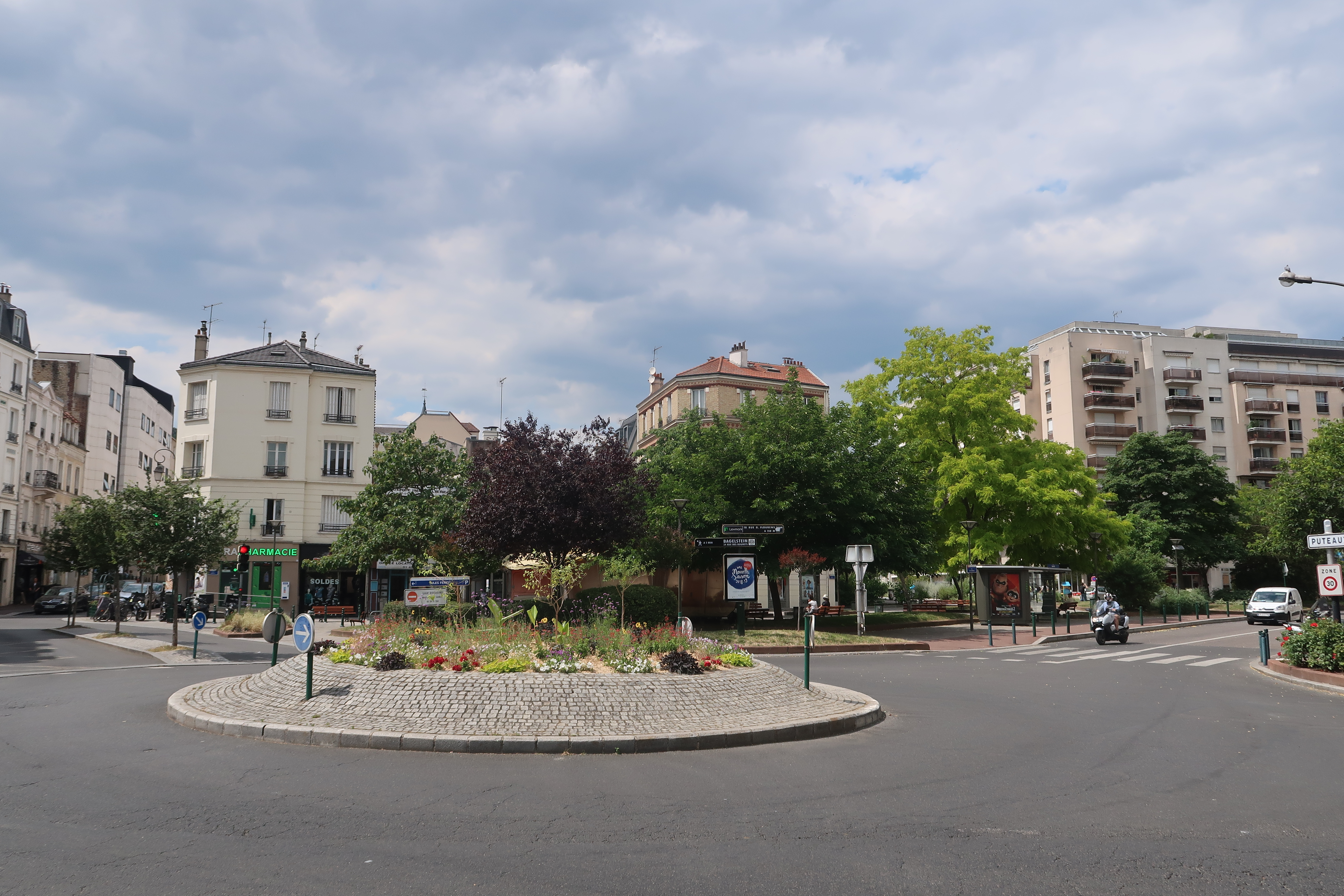
Place Henri-IV today, a place of political demonstrations during the Revolution.

Toulon, having just been recaptured from the English, a celebration was held by the municipality on January 9, 1794. The Saint-Leufroy church was closed to worship at the time and bore the inscription “temple of reason” on its pediment. The parish priest also renounced his priesthood. The Société Populaire then temporarily held its meetings there, the former place of worship also hosting the mayor's reading of the laws and decrees of the Convention. The mayor was summoned to Nanterre, the canton's capital, to organize the purging and reorganization of municipal authorities, with a supervisory committee subsequently taking charge. Citizen Rolin, observer commissioner for the Paris department, declared Suresnes a "very good patriot". The elementary school was reorganized, with gold and silver objects handed over to the district, along with the church linen. However, the mayor hoped that the latter would be returned, as they had subsequently been assigned to the school. After moving out of Bougault's home, the municipality took up precarious residence in the communal oven house, then, for a year, in the presbytery. By decree of May 12, 1794, the inscription on the church pediment was changed to "Le Peuple français reconnaît l'Être suprême et l'immortalité de l'âme" ("The French People recognize the Supreme Being and the immortality of the soul").

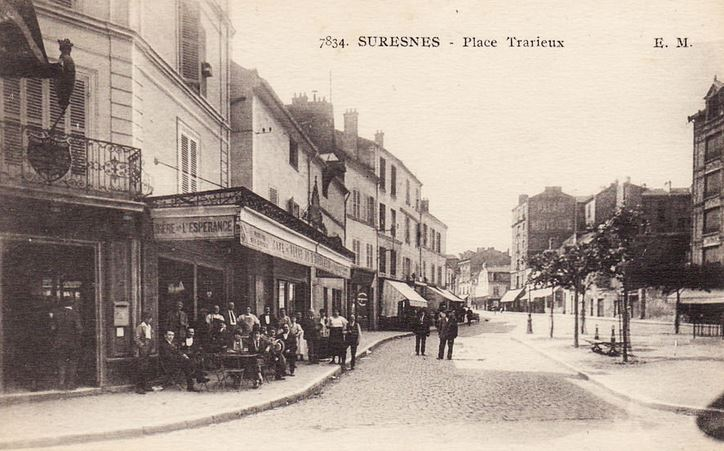
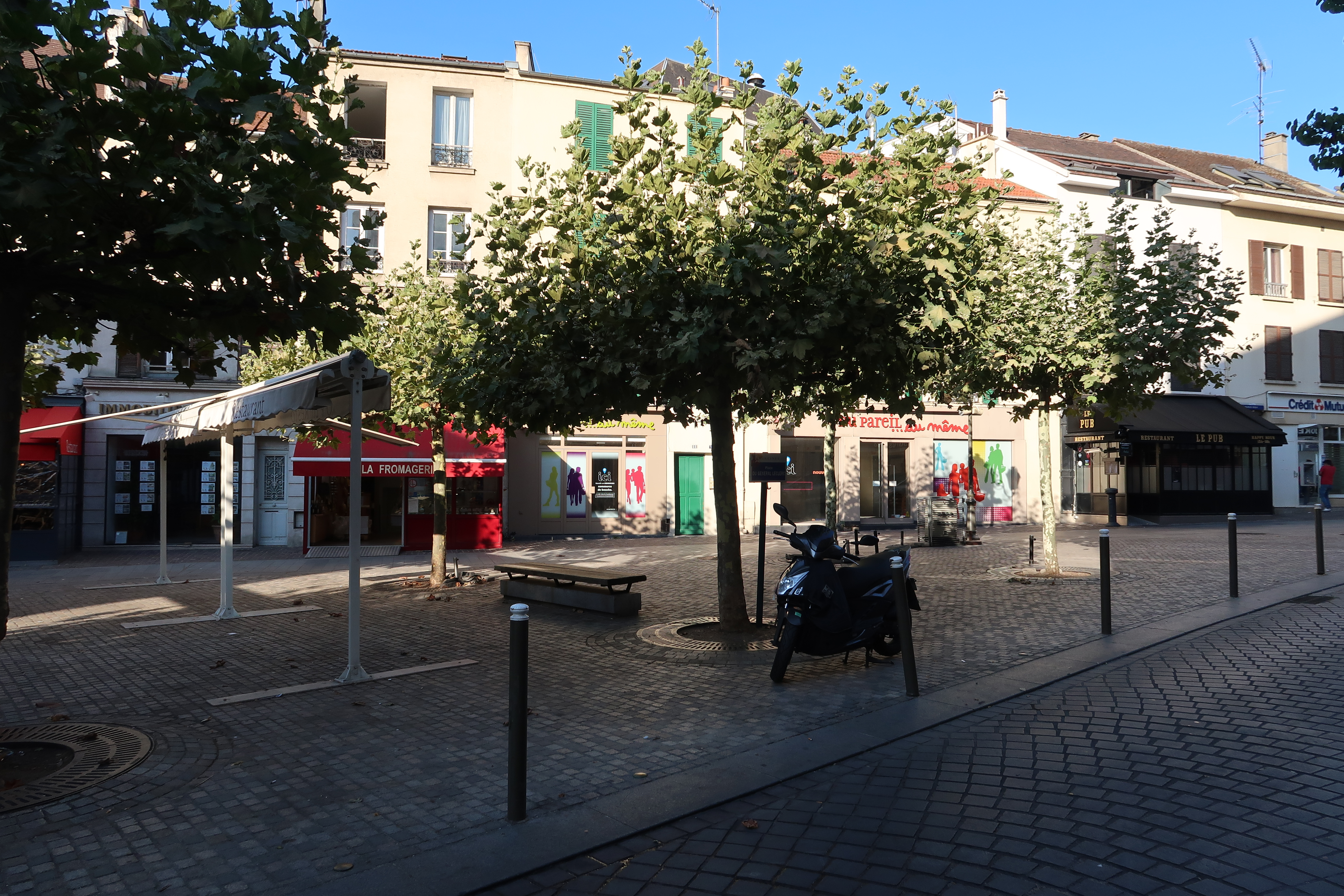
Place du Général-Leclerc, formerly Place d'Armes and later Place Trarieux (left, in the early 20th century; right, in the present day), with historic houses in the background. It has historically been the economic center of Suresnes.

In 1793 (Brumaire 28, Year II), the Société Populaire encouraged the municipality to erect a stone monument (obelisk) engraved with the names of volunteers who had died for their country, on the Place d'Armes, then the “commercial lung of Suresnes.” The first mention of this square dates back to 1406, when it was known as Place des Courtieux; it then became Place d'Armes, with old houses still standing on its south side; in 1791, it became Place de la Fédération, then Place d'Armes again, renamed Place Trarieux in 1906 after a minister, then Place du Général-Leclerc in 1948. The Esplanade des Courtieux remains next to the square. (Note: Completely redeveloped since then. In 2019, it was renamed the Jacques-Chirac esplanade.) Forgotten, the 1793 monument was destroyed in 1868, the mayor of the time stating that it "had no historical value".

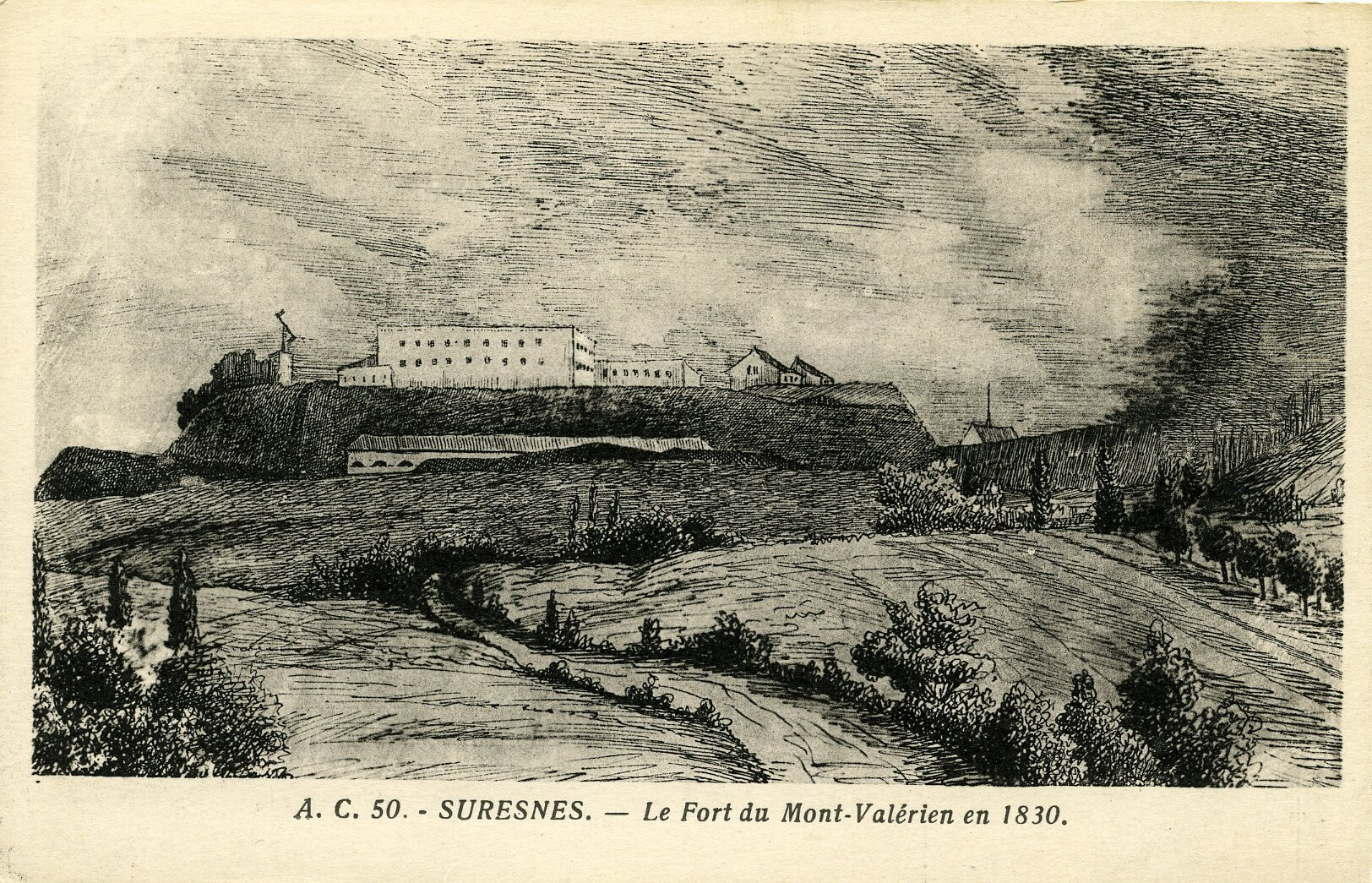
A Chappe telegraph (to the left of the military building) on Mount Valérien. Engraving from 1830.

On December 10, 1793, the municipality organized a celebration in honor of Marat and Lepeletier, attended by representatives of popular societies from neighboring towns; a brazier was built, where symbols of feudalism were burned, and a tree of liberty was planted in Place de l'Église. With the bell no longer ringing in the mornings to wake the inhabitants, a carillon was reinstated and renamed "le réveil des sans-culottes". The municipality defended certain citizens from the death penalty but remained merciless towards those who did not wear the tricolor cockade, demanding their incarceration. On May 14, 1794, La Marseillaise was sung for the first time in Suresnes, at a meeting of the Société Populaire. On July 28, the announcement of the 9th Thermidor was read out at the meeting, provoking neither emotion nor anger, as the Société went along with the Convention, perhaps out of absolute confidence or opportunism. Nevertheless, the Société disappeared in November of the same year.

During this period, several personalities linked to Suresnes came into contact with the police, including Madame de Cavagnac in July 1792, the minister Étienne Clavière the following year, counterfeiters, royalist brewers, and five fermiers généraux, the latter of whom were eventually guillotined. However, some nobles had the idea of leaving Paris and settling discreetly and modestly in Suresnes, where they were not bothered during the Terror.

In 1794, engineer Claude Chappe had a tower built on Mont Valérien, known as the Tour Chappe (in reality a semaphore). Thanks to optical signals sent to Lille, it was the first to announce to the Convention that the town of Condé-sur-l'Escaut had been retaken from the Austrians. It was destroyed by the Germans during the Second World War.

== Directory ==
The end of the Convention allowed hitherto hounded citizens to reappear, while modest celebrations were held to mark the victories of the Republic's armies. On April 13, 1795, Charles Descoins was appointed mayor by the Legislation Committee, replacing Lemoine, who was certainly suspect in the eyes of the new authorities. Following the law of Prairial 11 (May 30), which once again facilitated freedom of worship, religious activity resumed in the Saint-Leufroy church. For some time, the Suresnes church depended on the parish of Nanterre.

A survey carried out in mid-1795 showed that Suresnes had a population of 1,500, no industries, jewelers, pharmacists, or markets, but five wine merchants, seven seed merchants, three butchers, three bakers, and seven grocers. The law of 21 Fructidor, year III (September 7, 1795), abolished the municipal system for towns and villages with fewer than 5,000 inhabitants. Like Puteaux, Suresnes no longer had a mayor or municipal officers, but had a single “municipal agent” (Jean Nicolas Lebeau was elected) and was attached to the cantonal municipality of Nanterre.

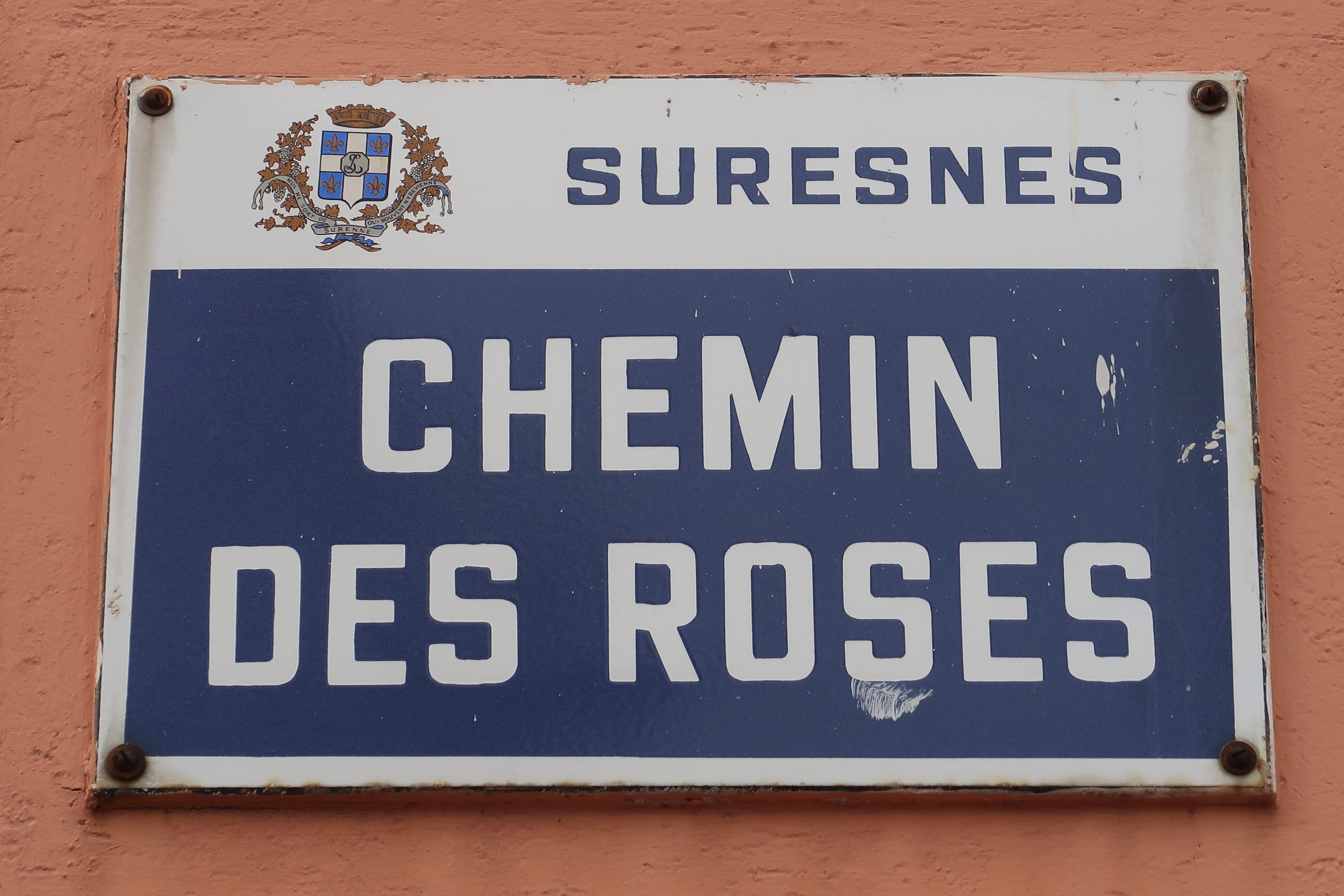
Plaque on the Chemin des Roses, in memory of this flower which was cultivated in Suresnes.

As the Directory had instituted a national holiday on August 10 (in commemoration of the law of 1789), Suresnes schoolteachers were instructed to bring their children to the festivities in front of the Tree of Liberty. On February 5, 1797, the canton delegate took possession of Suresnes' birth, marriage, and death registers, which were later returned under the Consulate: covering the period from 1597 to 1795, they are among the most complete sets of records for the communes around Paris. The archives of the time continue to report the poor condition and dirtiness of the roads in Suresnes, not least because of the volume of manure piling up in the squares and near the river. Ironically, the perfume rose was grown in Suresnes at this time, as it was in Puteaux, Fontenay, and L'Haye.

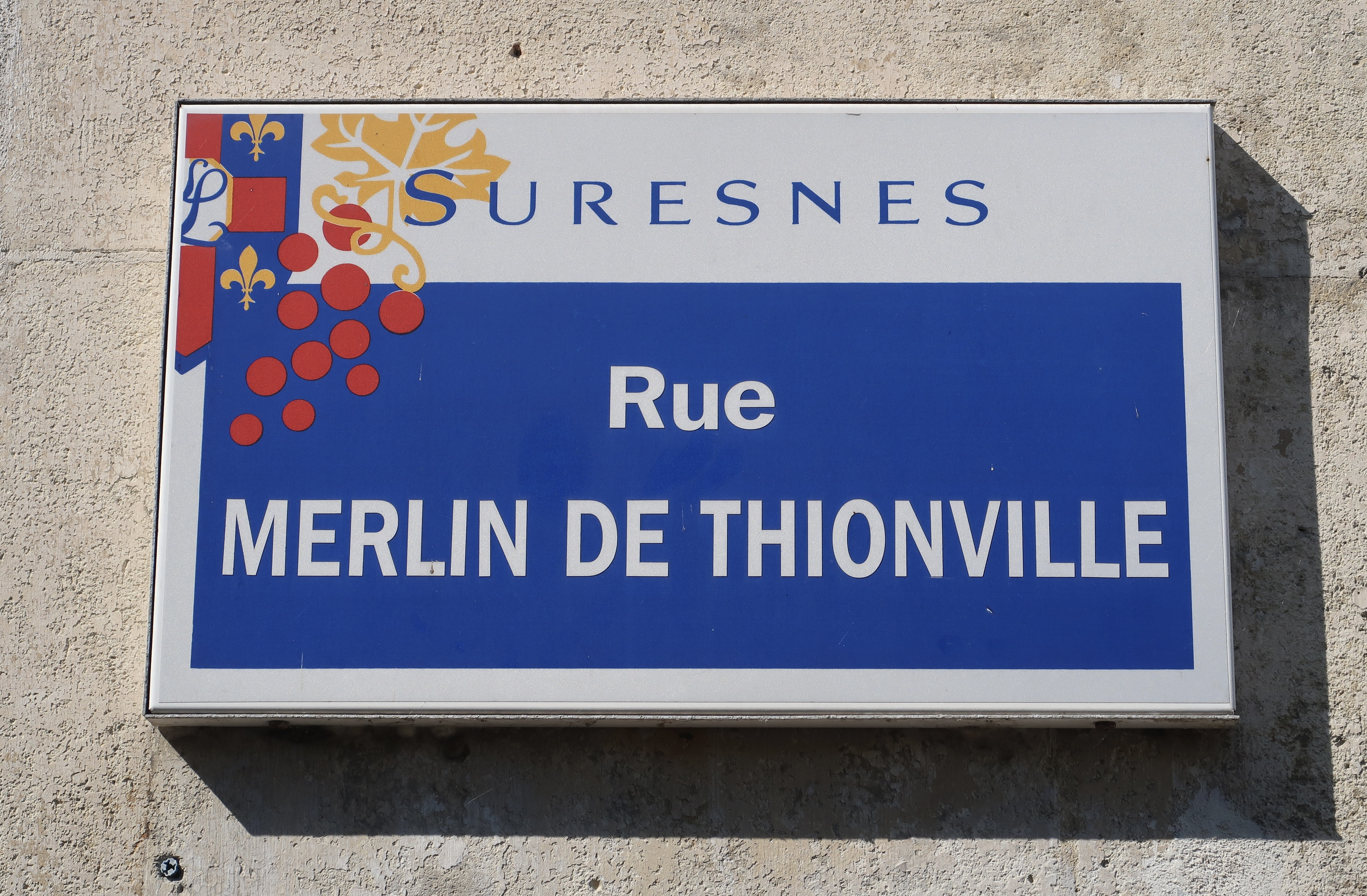
Plaque on rue Merlin-de-Thionville, in homage to the politician of the Directory who lived at the top of Mont Valérien.

Several leading Directory figures owned properties in Suresnes, including Paul Barras, who used his as a bachelor pad to entertain business people and VIPs, dining there one evening with Madame de Staël and Talleyrand. After one of these meetings, Talleyrand recounted the sadness of his friend Barras, who had just learned that one of his sweethearts had drowned following a swim along the Île de la Jatte. At the end of the regime, Suresnes also became famous for its “vendange baths,” recommended by many Parisian doctors, including Jean-Joseph Sue: to treat a sore limb, you had to soak in the lukewarm mixture that came out of the press. Joséphine de Beauharnais in particular used it, although it is not known whether it was effective. A man named Lagarde, who lived in Suresnes, also organized horse races there.

During the Revolution, the priests of Mont Valérien were expelled, and the calvary, closed on August 18, 1791, was partly demolished, while the hermits continued to be tolerated, on condition that they formed a civil society for agriculture and industry. In 1793, the religious building became national property. It was sold two years later to the politician Merlin de Thionville, close to the Black Band, who lived there but did not drive the hermits out. He did, however, plan to build a castle there, and some work was undertaken: Hubert Charpentier's grave and body were found by chance, in a good state of preservation. The mountain's religious vocation was replaced for a time by hedonistic and pagan values, according to 19th-century historiography: a statue of Venus replaced Christ, and a temple to Adonis was erected. The Conventionnel organized parties, deemed licentious, with Directory personalities such as Madame Tallien. In 1805, Merlin de Thionville sold his property to Father de Goy. In the same year, the cross was raised and two chapels were restored. The re-establishment of the Calvary cult meant that pilgrims were once again able to visit the site.

== Consulate and First Empire ==
The law of 28 pluviôse, year VIII (February 17, 1800), abolished cantonal municipalities and re-established mayors and municipal councilors in each commune, appointed by the prefect. Due to the town's size, Suresnes had 10 municipal councilors. On May 5 of the same year, Martin Bougault was re-elected mayor, replacing Bidard. In particular, he had to deal with the problem of manure heaps, which continued to overflow into certain streets. In March 1801, at the request of the Prefect of Paris, who required a list of bourgeois-owned houses in each town, Bougault passed on nine names, including the surgeon Jean-Joseph Sue (his son, the writer Eugène Sue, spent part of his childhood there), the brother of the Merlin de Thionville conventionalist, and a former solicitor who owned Château de la Source, soon sold to the Princess de Vaudémont, who entertained Madame de Staël and the Marquis de Custine there. In the same year, Bougault is said to have tried to re-establish the Suresnes National Guard. As elsewhere, Suresnes celebrated the anniversary of July 14 and, in 1802, the signing of the Peace of Amiens and the Concordat. The mayor also asked the prefect several times to rehabilitate the Chemin de Rueil, so that Suresnois could go to the Saint-Germain market. On April 26, 1802, he sent a letter to First Consul Napoleon Bonaparte, asking him to set up a seminary on Mont Valérien, as the commune's resources had diminished (although he downplayed their size) after the removal of the calvary; he had the agreement of the site's owner, Merlin de Thionville, for the sale, but the deal fell through. Bougault was relieved of his duties on February 5, 1803, and replaced again by Bidard. From 1808 onwards, the Trappists supervised the calvary, which had finally been returned to worship three years earlier. However, in 1811, upon learning that a conspiracy led by religious dignitaries was being discussed at Mont Valérien, the Emperor sent a battalion of grenadiers from Courbevoie to the site, had certain buildings razed, and sent the Trappist monks to Vincennes. On December 2 of the same year, he signed a decree to create on this site one of his six Legion of Honor houses, intended for poor or orphaned officers' daughters. The architect Vestier was commissioned to carry out the work: whereas the old calvary faced east, the new building faced Saint-Cloud, a symbolic site of the Empire. Napoleon even came to visit the site, but, suddenly realizing its strategic interest, put an end to his initial project and had the place converted into barracks. This horseshoe-shaped construction has since been nicknamed the “1812 building” (although it was completed later) and houses the headquarters and museum of the 8th Signal Regiment.

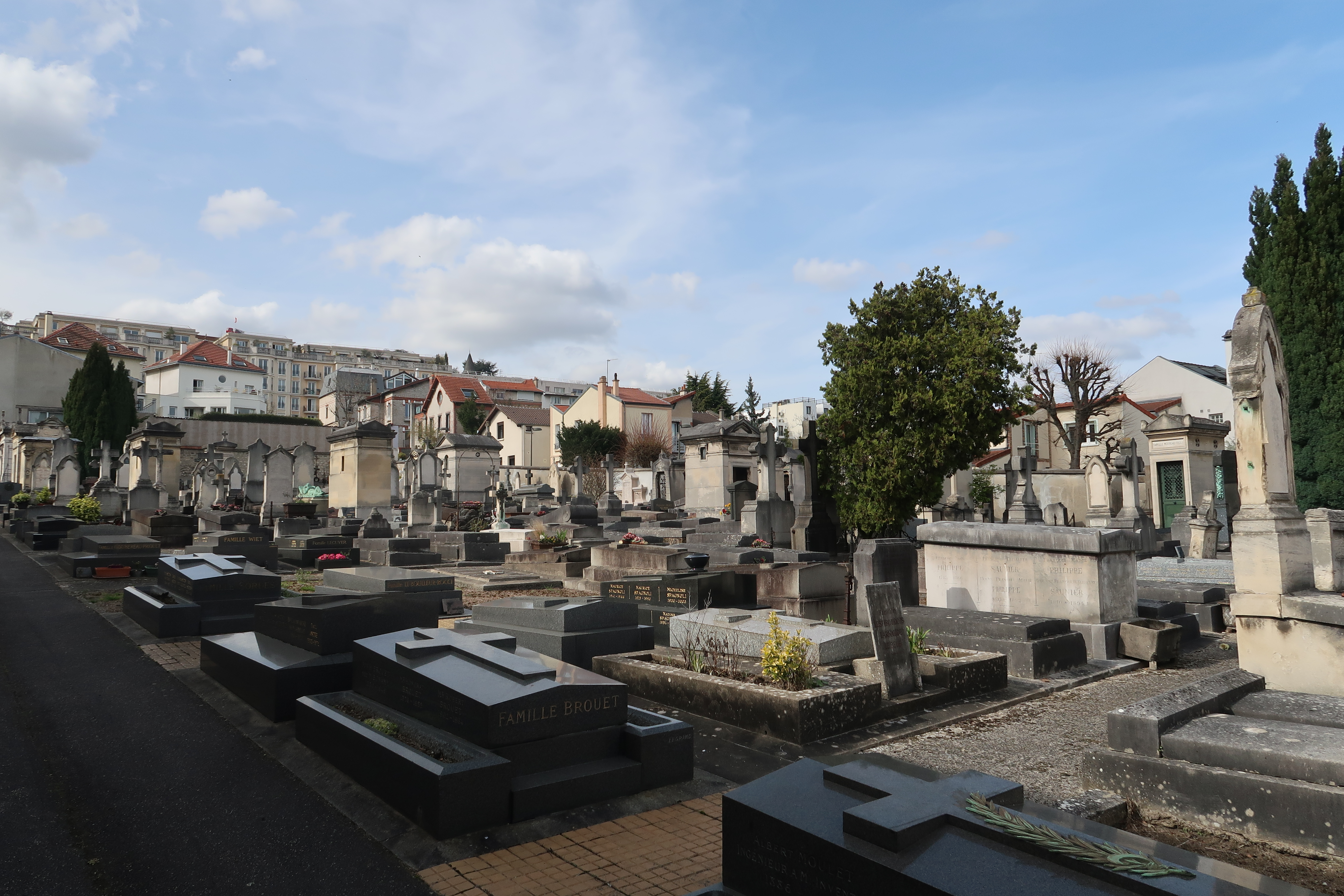
The Carnot cemetery, the oldest cemetery in the city still in operation.

In 1811, the de Vogüé family applied for a plot in the new Carnot cemetery, built a year earlier (replacing the old Fouillée cemetery), in exchange for a house they owned on Place de l'Église. Several prominent figures are buried here, including diplomat Jean-Baptiste Nicolas Dorothée Villar, vice-admiral Jean-Baptiste Philibert Willaumez, writer Laure Surville, painter Pierre Carrier-Belleuse, fashion designer Charles Frederick Worth, doctor Ernest Bazin, tenor Pierre-François Villaret, baritone Théophile Manoury, singer Marie-Joséphine Picquet-Wild, general Gustave Paul Cluseret, painter François Brunery, explorer Isabelle Massieu and mayor Henri Sellier. A few years later, while the main building was being renovated, the municipality set up a temporary girls' school in the house. Under the Restoration, poor children were housed here, as well as the schoolmistress's lodgings and those of two Sisters of Charity, who assisted the needy.

On January 3, 1811, the Emperor made the former seigniorial house of Suresnes available to the Ministry of War to accommodate 100 convalescent soldiers, as the Vincennes depot had been closed. The buildings were refurbished, giving them a barracks-like appearance. After Napoleon's defeat, they were occupied by sick Austrian soldiers. In the 1830s, it was occupied by short-lived industries, and cafés and guinguettes later invaded its gardens.

On January 16, 1813, during the Russian campaign, the mayors of Puteaux, Courbevoie, Nanterre, Asnières, Gennevilliers, Colombes, and Suresnes, outraged by the treachery of General d'Yorck, who had defected to the enemy, met and decided to equip three mounted cavalrymen to join the army, in support of the imperial government, and to call up the conscripts of the years 1809 to 1812, inviting them to join the cavalry. After the first fall of the Empire, France was occupied. A statement dated April 1, 1814, shows that 36 Suresnois delivered 5,503 francs worth of goods to the occupying troops, with the mayor also receiving 500 francs for requisitioned fodder. After the defeat at Waterloo in 1815, Prussian troops entered Suresnes in July, began new requisitions, and set up a small garrison in the town. English soldiers stationed in Puteaux also occupied Suresnes from November, carrying out requisitions; Hanoverian troops followed them. The Allies left Suresnes for good on January 27, 1816, and compensation for requisitions and damaged property was not paid until 1820.

== Restoration ==
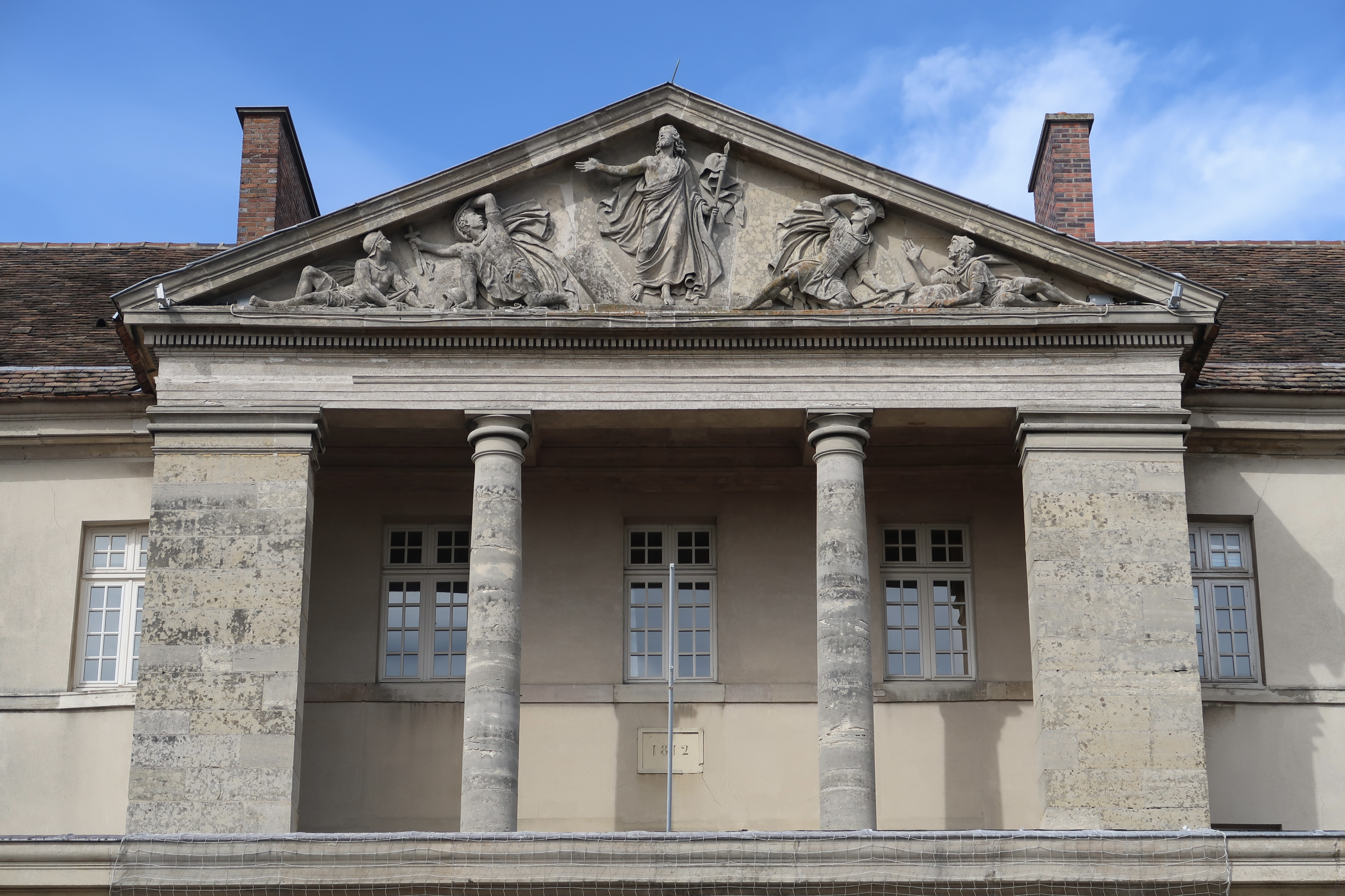
The pediment of the "1812 building", initially intended to decorate the church of Charles Forbin-Janson, now overlooks a military building.

Because of his attachment to the former emperor, Mayor Bidard was forced to resign and, under the royal decree of January 13, 1815, was replaced by the owner Lefébure. On April 15, 1816, the commander of the Seine National Guard, Baudron d'Issencourt, came to Suresnes to attend the blessing of the French flag and the inauguration of the bust of King Louis XVIII in the town hall. Ill-equipped and understaffed (two companies of 34 and 39 men), the Suresnes National Guard remained modest until Louis-Philippe I reassured its operation on a national level.

Mont Valérien regained its religious vocation, with the Fathers of Mercy (Missionaries of France) taking possession of the site in 1822, thanks to the King's approval, and relaunching pilgrimages around the Napoleonic-era building. The château de Forbin-Janson had also been built on the hill in the previous century. It first belonged to the Marquise de Rochegude, then to her daughter, the Marquise de Forbin-Janson. The ultra-royalist bishop of Nancy, abbot, and primate of Lorraine, Charles de Forbin-Janson, inherited it during the Restoration and made it his country home. Around it, he created a park “planted with rare species” and a neo-Gothic chapel (now known as the "Chapelle des fusillés"). Having brought back relics from the Holy Land and rebuilt a calvary (facing east) and a Way of the Cross in 1828, he planned to build a neo-Byzantine church, reusing a pediment erected in 1812 for the building commissioned by Napoleon, with a Christ sculpted by Jean-Pierre Cortot, who appears to Roman soldiers after the Resurrection. For Philippe Castagnetti, the reinstatement of the Calvary is an “expiatory monument to the crimes of a godless capital,” particularly those committed against the Church during the Revolution. The Mount Valérien pilgrimage regained great popularity, attracting thousands of people during the Feasts of the Cross; King Charles X even climbed the mountain barefoot, surrounded by young girls crowned with white flowers, banner-bearers, and Swiss guards. In addition to the True Cross relic, flasks containing water from the Dead Sea and the Jordan River are also on display. In the early 1840s, when the Thiers law provided for the creation of a fortress on the mountain, the bishop's unfinished church was destroyed, but the pediment was preserved and replaced on the façade of the 1812 building, garnished with columns that had previously adorned the sanctuary. His château is now part of the fortress. The abbot had endowed it with corner turrets, decorated with Lorraine crosses on the lintels of certain windows, a reminder of his role as primate from 1823 to 1830.

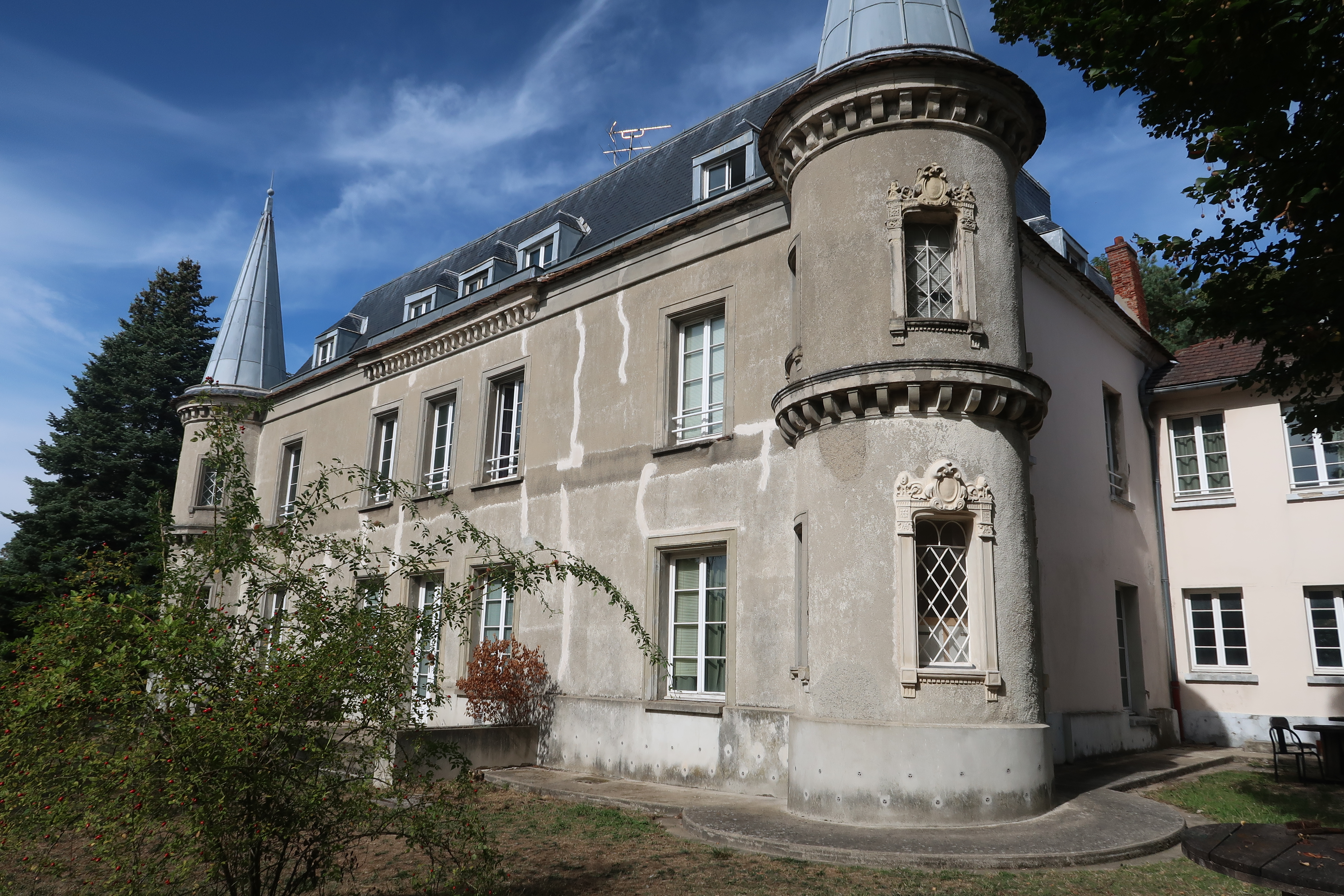
The castle of Forbin-Janson, residence of the abbot who revived the pilgrimage during the Restoration.

In return for payment, Suresnes residents renovated the roads, making them passable again. In May 1820, after the unrest of recent decades had led to several changes in signage, street names, and numbers were repainted, and the Place de la Croix (which no longer had a cross) was renamed Place Henri-IV, because “there still exists a room where conferences were held” in Suresnes. On November 11, 1820, the municipality took out fire insurance for several public buildings, a recent social innovation. On January 1, 1821, the municipal council decided to donate 200 francs to the fund set up to donate the Château de Chambord to the young Prince de Berry, whose father had just been assassinated; on May 1, 120 francs were also distributed to the poor by the municipality in honor of the Prince's christening, and Suresnois were invited to illuminate the windowsills of their homes that evening. In 1819, two Sisters of Charity opened a private school for girls.

In 1822, a seminal event in Suresnes' urban development for the rest of the 19th century took place: its transformation, says René Sordes, “in less than a century from a small winegrowers' village [to] a major industrial and residential city.” Until then, the only proto-industrial activities included laundries, a few plasterers, and a manufacturer of pottery, bricks, and tiles who exploited the gypsum and clay quarries on Mont Valérien. On January 4, Rouques, a Paris dyer, acquired a property in Suresnes, on a parcel of land that had once belonged to the Duc de Noirmoutier (near the Rue du Bac and the Seine), and became the first major industrial estate. The water from Rouques was then discharged into the river. In 1823, he had a chimney built for his factory, and in 1830, he obtained the right to acquire a steam engine. In 1827, Mr. Byerley, a Parisian, applied for permission to set up a steel factory at 26 Rue de Neuilly, (Note: Current Rue de Verdun.) on land that would later become a cycle and automobile factory. Despite protests from the neighbors, (Note: Gentlemen Rothschild, Pages and launderers.) he obtained authorization the following year but closed in 1829 for financial reasons.

On the night of October 31 to November 1, 1824, the Saint-Leufroy church was the victim of a burglary, with thieves breaking into the tabernacle and scattering the hosts. On November 7, the Archbishop of Paris, Hyacinthe-Louis de Quélen, came in person to Suresnes to attend an expiatory ceremony. In 1827, two new bells were inaugurated.

Following complaints from residents in 1823 about stagnant water escaping from the laundries, the commune decided to create a small stream, 1.33 m wide, to drain the water, as it could not afford to redo the disjointed cobblestones in the roadway. In 1825, the municipality decided for the first time to have the mud and garbage invading the streets removed every Sunday and on public holidays. However, the streets continued to suffer from storms, with rain pouring down from Mont Valérien in torrents, turning the heart of the village into a swamp.

In April 1828, the Suresnes fire department was created, financed by a subscription involving the Princess de Vaudémont, the Vicomtesse de Laval, and Salomon de Rothschild (who lived mainly in Paris, Rue Laffitte, and had bought the Duc de Chaulnes' former property in Suresnes). Following a series of difficulties, it was dissolved in 1831, but the pump continued to be maintained.

== July Monarchy ==
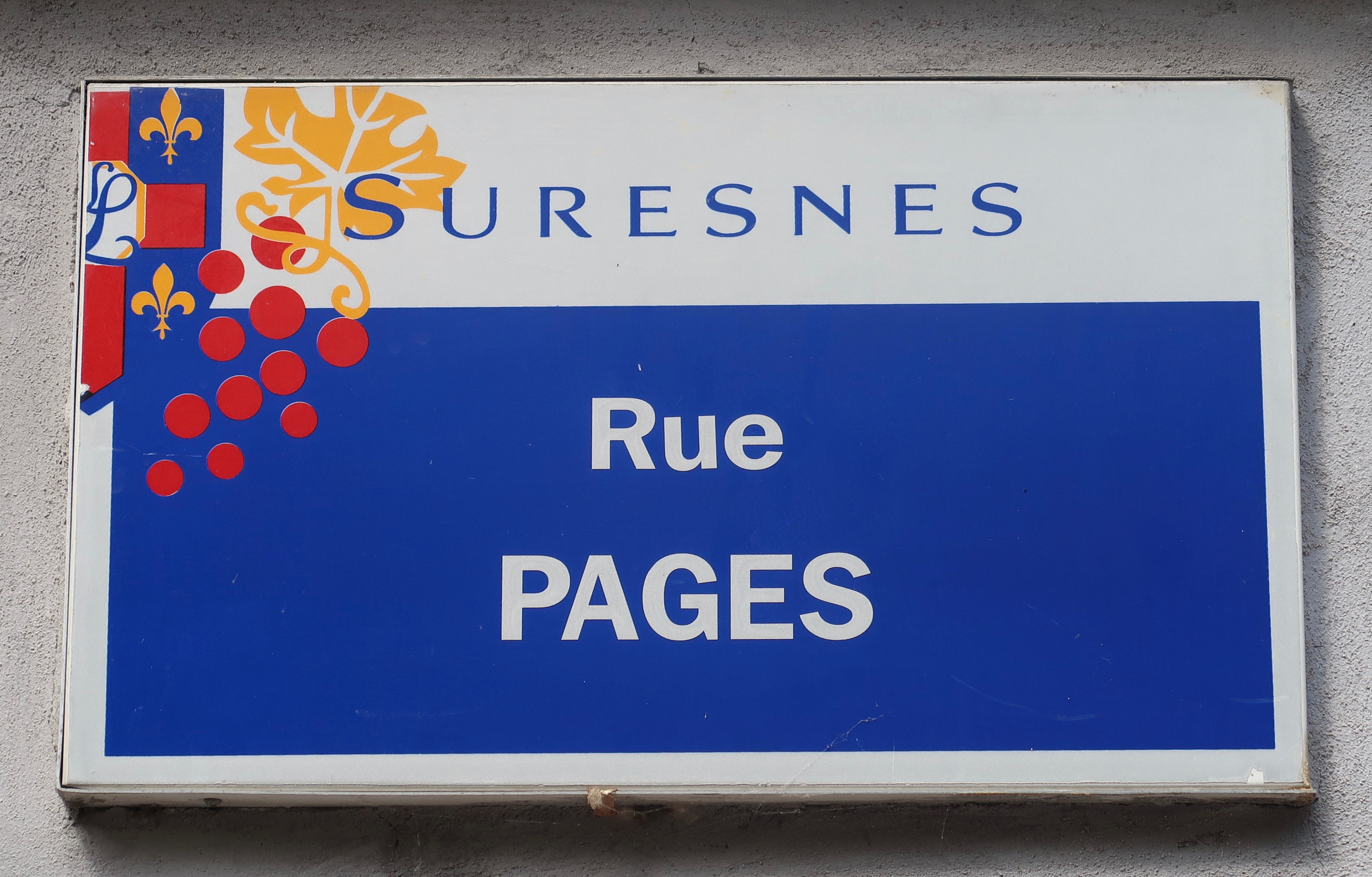
Plaque on Rue Pagès, in homage to the mayor in office from 1830 to 1832.

As is often the case with most political events in Paris, the Revolution of 1830 had no direct impact on rural life in Suresnes, apart from a brief visit by the royal guard on July 30 and 31. On September 7, the town's notables appointed Pagès as mayor, a decision confirmed by the prefect the same day. He replaced Lefébure, who held Legitimist views and came in for strong criticism from the Suresnois. Conflicts between Carlists and pro-Louis-Philippe liberals remained latent, however, with the parish priest making no secret of his opposition to the new regime. With 1,367 inhabitants, the village was entitled to twelve municipal councilors. The National Guard was also recreated, with 240 men. On September 14, 1831, 15 men from the Suresnes company guarded the Château de Neuilly, residence of the new king. In 1832, as elsewhere in the Paris region, Suresnes was hit by a cholera epidemic, which affected 161 people and killed 70; the insalubrity of some of the dwellings contributed to its spread (while at the same time, the school was dilapidated and damp). Another less violent epidemic occurred in 1849-1850. Pagès resigned as mayor on August 9 and was replaced by the owner René Sentou.

Industrial expansion continued: in December 1835, Maheu and Geoffroy applied for permission to set up a cloth-printing factory in the old seigneurial house, which the authorities granted, despite the neighbors' fears. By this time, the idea was growing that outside workers would be needed to keep these industries running, and that the winegrowers could not ensure Suresnes' development on their own.

=== Transport development ===
As far as transport was concerned, Suresnes had always been a small rural town, far from the capital, and was generally reached on foot. In the 18th century, however, hired carriages began to appear, which could take a maximum of eight people per carriage within a radius of three leagues, although their price limited their use to the bourgeoisie. In 1777, a regular transport service to the suburbs was created (every hour of the day, serving Suresnes, Place Courqueux), which became more liberal after the Revolution. In 1788, Suresnes artisans and merchants owned a total of 31 carriages and 52 draught horses. Until the end of the 19th century and the invention of the automobile, military personnel traveled mainly on horseback, and workers on bicycles. In 1828, omnibus companies were created, including one passing through Suresnes called “Les Accélérées,” which made eight trips a day. In 1855, all the companies were merged into the Compagnie Générale des Omnibus. On November 26, 1874, the omnibus was replaced by a horse-drawn tramway that ran from Suresnes along the Seine to Courbevoie; to reach Paris, passengers had to take another tramway from Courbevoie to Place de l'Étoile, leaving them far from the center of the capital. Running on poor quality tracks, to the point where it could sometimes derail, and able to carry only around 30 passengers, it was extended to Saint-Cloud around 1878. The horse then disappeared, replaced by a pneumatic system that suffered serious setbacks and rapidly collapsed, paving the way for mechanical traction transport. Until the Great War, horse-drawn carriages were also used, both by the community and by private individuals, to go to the Longchamp station, to guinguettes, or for weddings at the town hall and church.

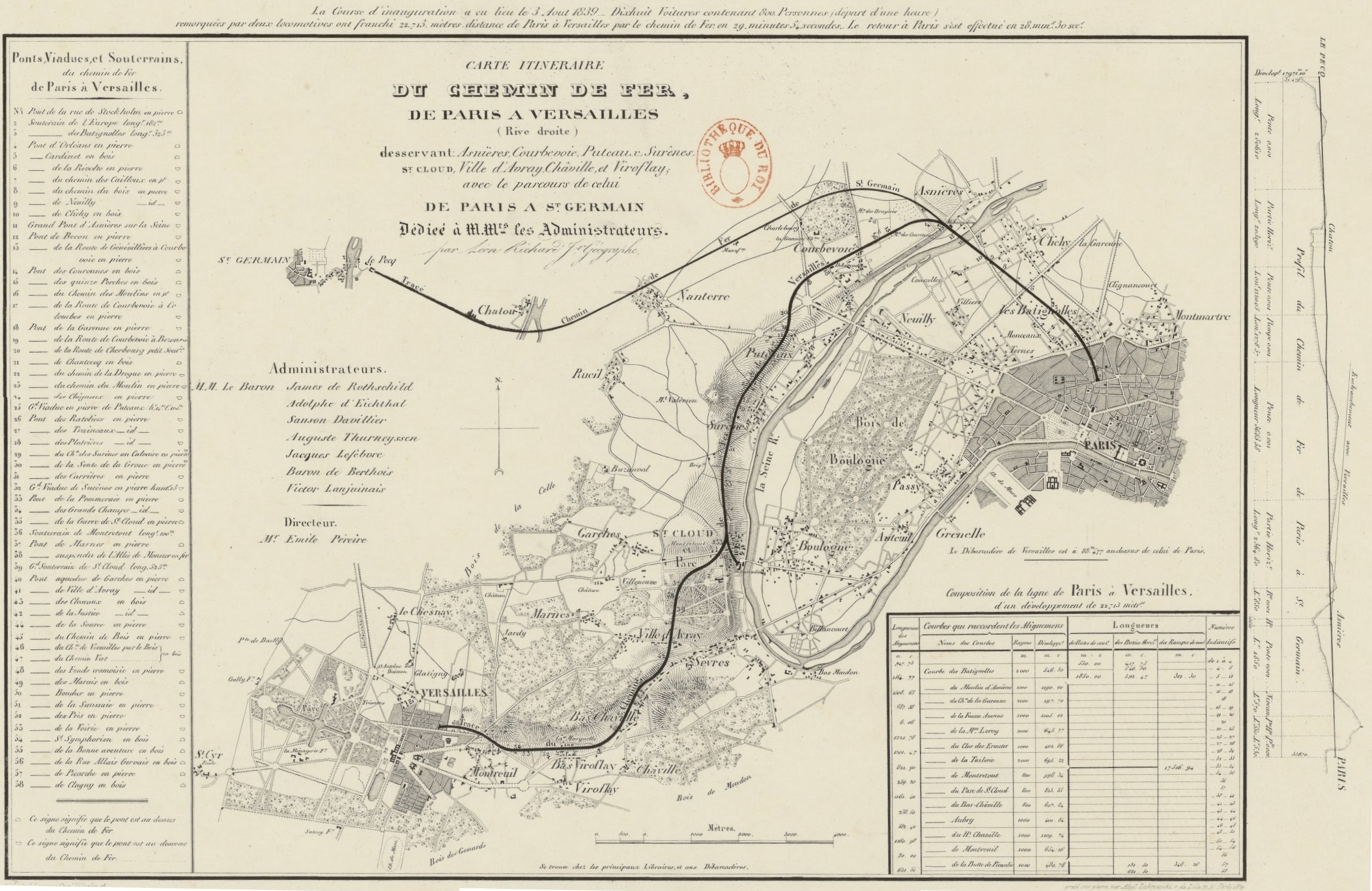
Map of the Paris-Versailles railway (1839), which helped to open up Suresnes.

In 1836, plans were announced for the construction of a railroad line that would cross Suresnes at mid-slope from north to south, symbolically separating the village from the high hills. The route would also encroach on cultivated land, making it difficult for winegrowers on both sides to access their vineyards. Following tough negotiations, a financial agreement was reached to compensate the landowners. Of the fifteen footpaths that existed at this location, only five remain, profoundly altering the centuries-old habits of pedestrian traffic. The cultivation of cereals and vines began to give way to market gardening, which was more lucrative for the farmers. The first train was launched on August 2, 1839, running every 1.5 hours from 7:30 a.m. to 12:30 a.m.. In 1855, it took 35 minutes from Suresnes station to Saint-Lazare station, and 25 minutes in 1866, for a fare of 60 centimes in first class and 40 in second. The line was electrified in 1928, reducing journey time to 18 minutes. In the end, the line helped to open up and develop Suresnes, as the number of industries grew, transporting workers and wine merchants, even though most of the population remained rural. Suresnes evolved from a simple village to a large town.

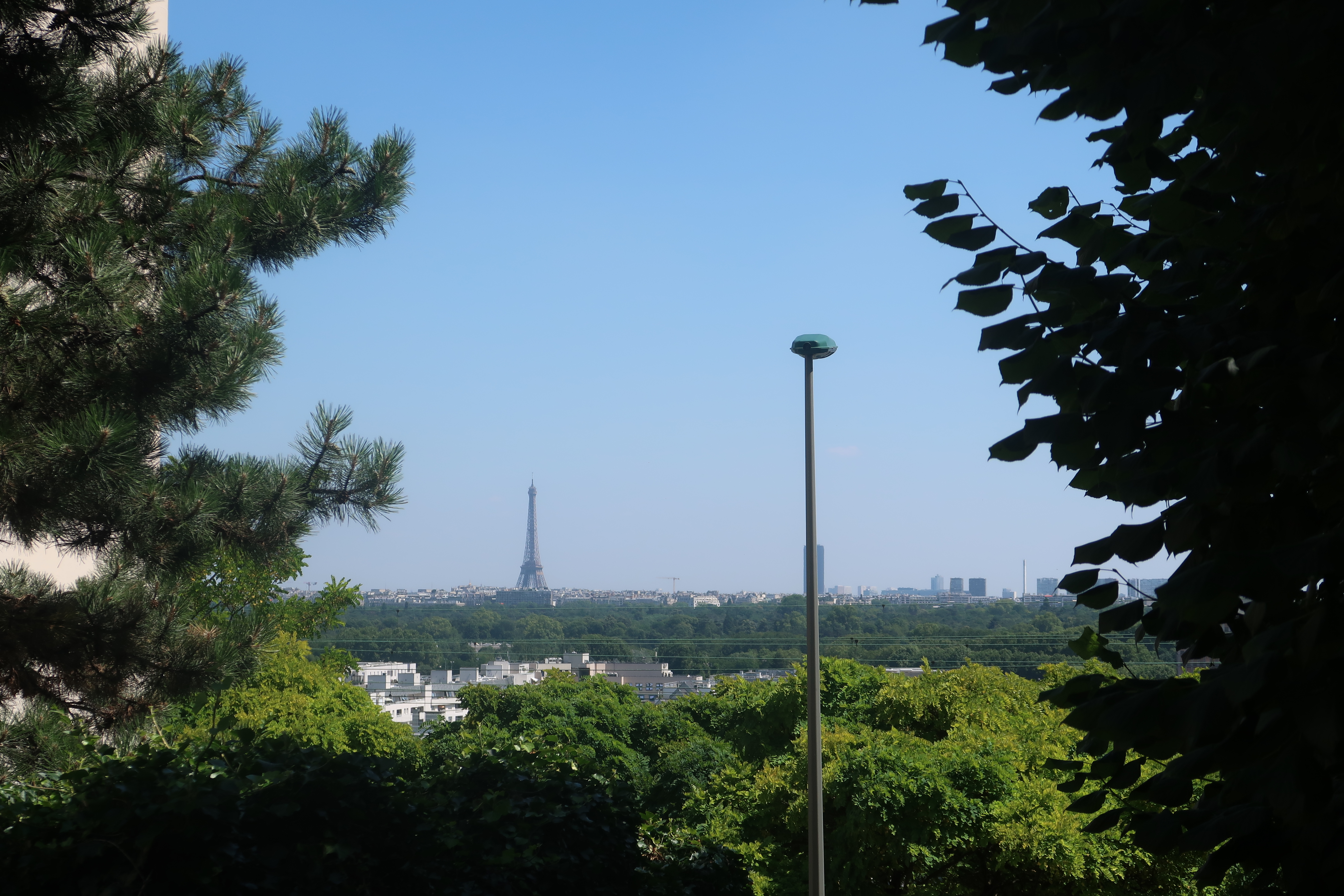
View from the hills of Suresnes, at the level of the railway line, offering a vast panorama of Paris to travelers of this new means of transport.

Early travelers were enthusiastic about the view from Suresnes. One of them commented: "The view continues to be as admirable as the one we tried to describe above, and is certainly one of the most beautiful in the Paris area. Turning your back on the Calvary, you can see the Seine from the Neuilly Bridge to the Saint-Cloud Bridge, a length of more than two leagues. On the other bank, the Bois de Boulogne unfurls like a rich carpet of greenery, revealing behind it Paris, which you can see at a glance, and whose monuments can be distinguished, from the Arc de Triomphe, which rises like a giant of glory on the left, to the dome of the Invalides, which ends on the right".

Thanks to a departmental grant, the Carnot cemetery was enlarged and, in 1841, a comprehensive plan of works was presented, after the mayor had noted that "new constructions are multiplying in Suresnes": in particular, the roads, still in a deplorable state, and the school needed to be modernized. However, local opposition to the project led to its failure. The construction of the Boulevard de Versailles (since 1944, Boulevard Henri-Sellier) destroyed many middle-class homes with beautiful gardens on the outskirts of the village. With the help of grants from the Ministry of the Interior, the commune was able to acquire property to house the town hall, guardhouse, prison, and schools in a more suitable location. In 1843, several citizens requested permission to create a company of voltigeurs in Suresnes, the numbers of which indicated that the proportion of inhabitants born outside the commune was increasing, thus making it possible to measure the importance of external contributions to population growth.

=== Mont Valérien fortress ===
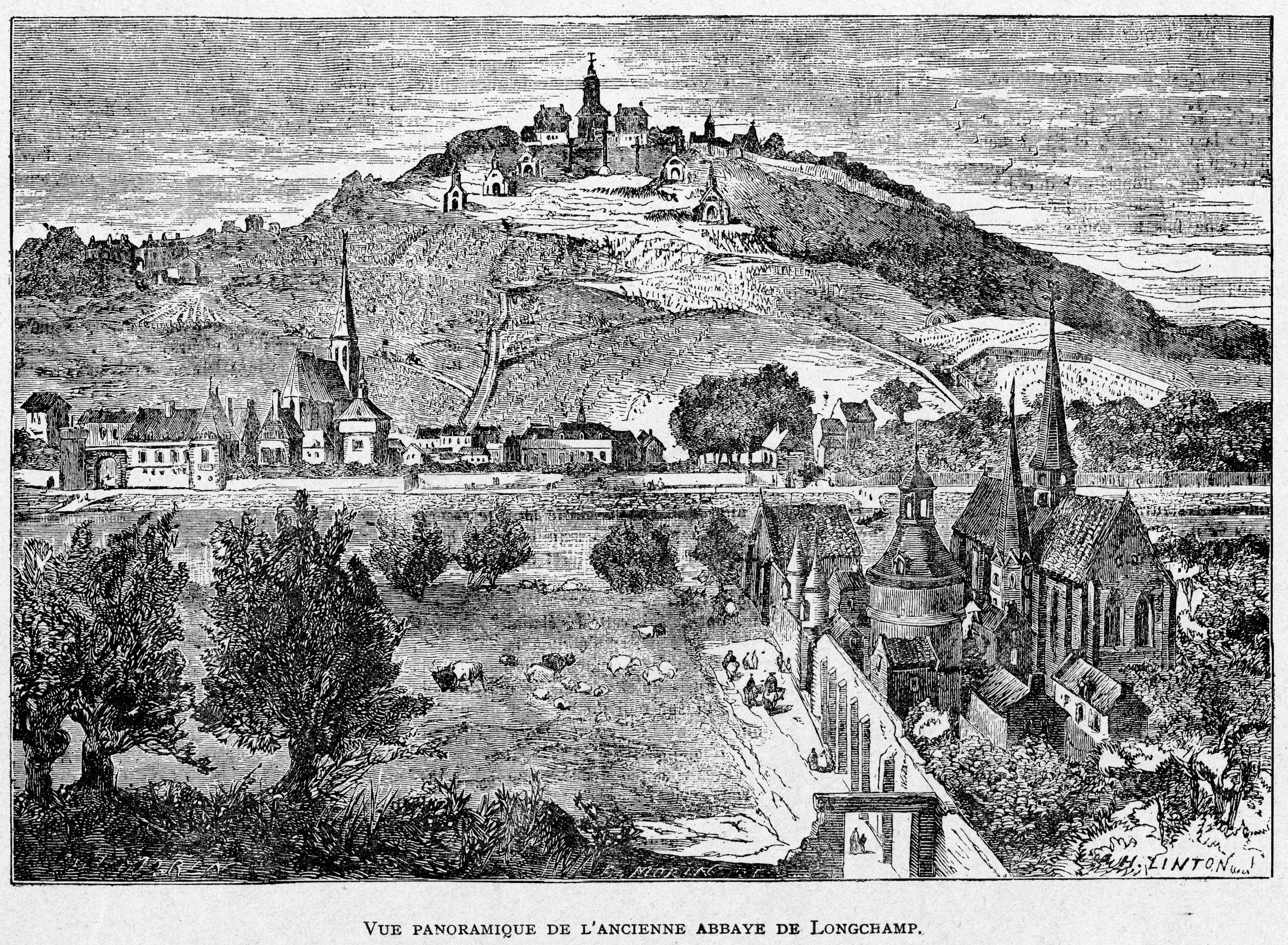
Engraving by Edmond Morin showing the ruins of Longchamp Abbey, with Suresnes and the Calvary of Mont Valérien in the background, before its conversion into a fortress.

The revolution of 1830 had ousted Father de Forbin-Janson and dispersed the missionaries who had set up on the Calvary, supporting the Legitimists, and the buildings had since fallen into ruin. This marked the definitive end of pilgrimages to Mont Valérien. The three crosses, which had already been broken during the First Republic, were sent to the cemetery of Saint-Pierre church, near today's Sacré-Coeur basilica in Paris. The paintings in the Calvaire church were sold, with the Saint-Germain-en-Laye and Saint-Symphorien churches in Versailles acquiring them.

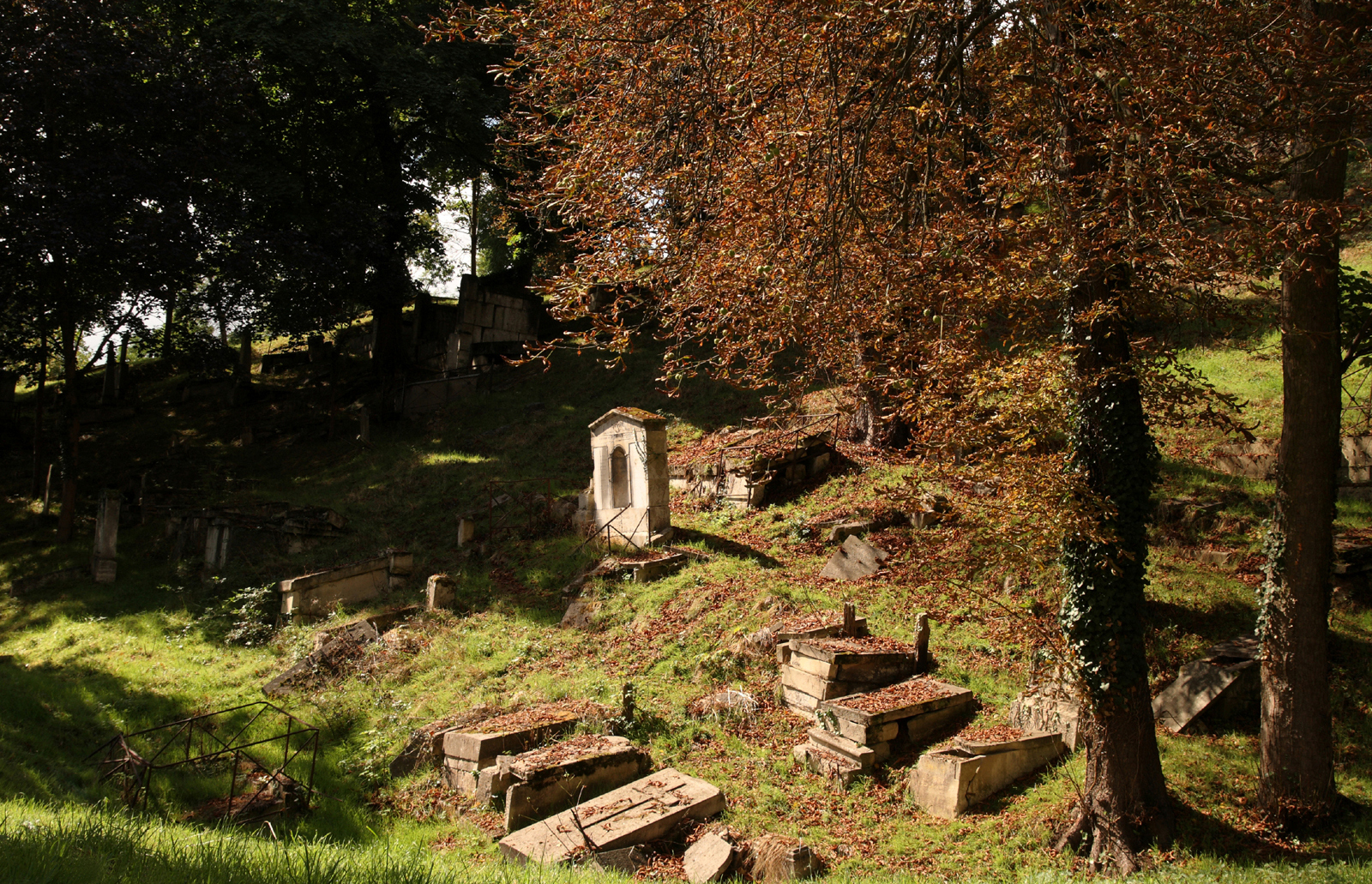
The abandoned cemetery of Mont Valérien, within the fort, has been preserved as it was since the 1830s.

Built in the early 1610s to plans by the architect Autissier for the hermit Séraphin de Noüe, at the request of Queen Marguerite de Navarre, a crypt is said to be the last surviving architectural evidence of the Calvary. It takes the form of an annular vault resting on a central pillar on the inside; on the outside, a gable bears a bell christened Joan of Arc by the troops of the 8th Transmission Regiment, as she is one of the unit's patrons, having also “received” votes. In 1954, it was converted into a chapel. The Mont-Valérien cemetery, created by Forbin-Janson in 1823, is also located here. It was intended for the counter-revolutionary aristocratic elite, who did not wish to be buried in the large Parisian cemeteries built during the Napoleonic period, which were open to all, regardless of social origin or religion, and therefore preferred this sacred site. Many famous figures are buried here, including Marshals Charles du Houx de Vioménil and Louis Aloÿs de Hohenlohe-Waldenbourg-Bartenstein, bishops Sébastien-Michel Amelot and Étienne Antoine Boulogne, and painter Marie-Guillemine Benoist. It was closed at the same time as the Calvary in 1830, but emigrants from the revolutionary period still had the privilege of being buried there. It also receives bodies from the two former Calvaire churches. The abbot had created it to finance the neo-Byzantine church he was planning, with concessions being the object of major financial transactions. There are two zones, one for the laity (Nord-Saint-Joseph, with its imposing stone tombs) and the other for the religious (Midi-Notre-Dame-des-Sept-Douleurs, with its simple wooden crosses and the tombs of former hermits removed following the 1812 renovations), separated by the staircase built in 1780. Despite its high cost, the cemetery was a great success, even competing with Père-Lachaise and the Picpus cemetery. Located within the military precinct, it has since been abandoned, with the municipality now referring to it as Suresnes' “romantic cemetery.”

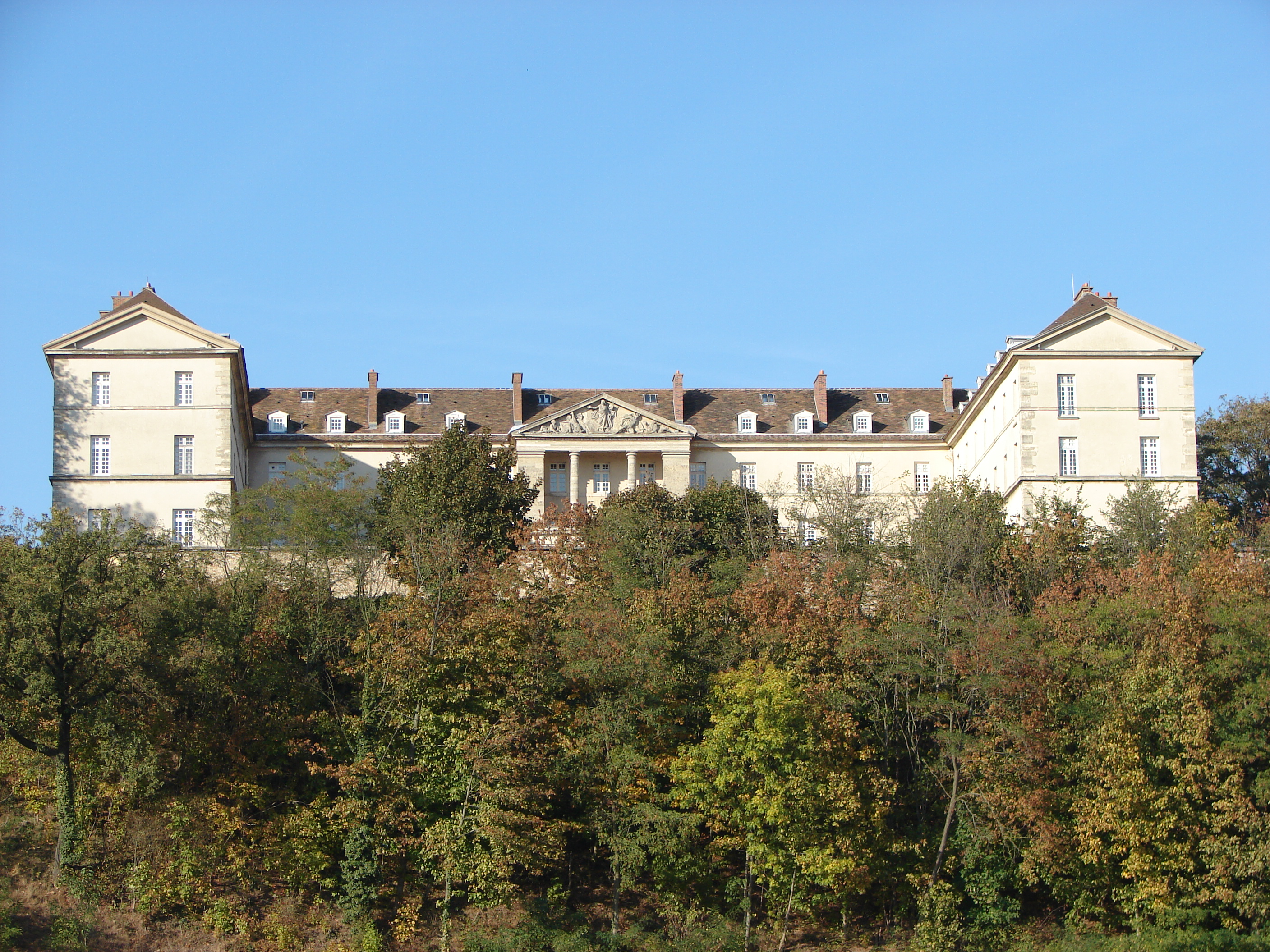
The fortress: these are the buildings erected in 1812, with new barracks being created behind them during the work in the 1840s.

The closure of the Calvary and cemetery was a blow to Suresnes' commercial activity (particularly the ferry), prompting the mayor to complain. But in 1841, Adolphe Thiers decided to surround Paris with fortifications, and Mont Valérien was chosen as the site for a military structure, completed in 1844 for 4.5 million francs. General Dode de la Brunerie supervised the work. The religious remains were definitively destroyed to make mortar, and a barracks was built on a 23-hectare site. The small crypt, the cemetery, and the Château de Forbin-Janson are now located inside the fort and, like the 1812 building, are off-limits to the public. The mountain's former quarries are filled in. The fort, which could house 1,500 infantry and 60 artillery personnel, housed two barracks for the troops, as well as weapons and ammunition stores. Ramparts were built around the military buildings, with a moat and guardhouse. At the time, the fortress was located on the territories of the communes of Rueil-Malmaison, Nanterre, and Suresnes, but following a request, Suresnes obtained that the perimeter of the fortress should be solely under its jurisdiction, insofar as the building replaced land that was predominantly Suresnois, strategic roads passed through it and the postern belonged to Suresnes. The decision was ratified by a law passed by the National Assembly on July 31, 1850, and promulgated on August 9, 1850. This was the second major annexation of Suresnes, after the "pas Saint-Maurice" under the Convention. On June 10, M. de Laurencin applied to have a road on his property recognized as a Rue de Suresnes: initially Rue Sainte-Apolline, it became Rue Berthelot. Baron de Rothschild offers 5,000 francs to buy the last meadows that Suresnes owns on the Île de Puteaux. This marked the end of the town's “communal property” in this area.

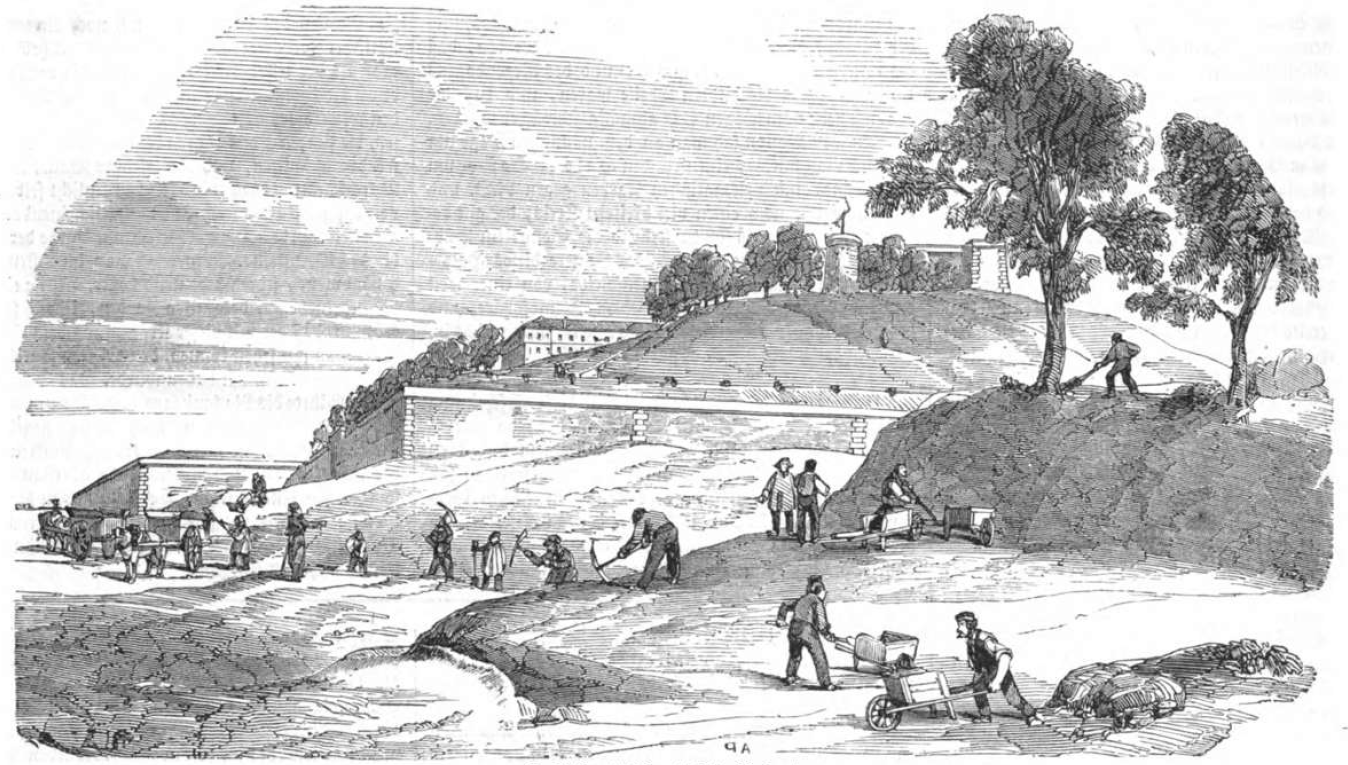
Mont Valérien under construction in 1843, following the final destruction of the religious buildings. Note Chappe's telegraph at the top right.

To enable military convoys to reach the fort, a strategic road was built between 1844 and 1855: today's Boulevard Washington and Boulevard De-Lattre-de-Tassigny. While the fortress was being built, the Château de Forbin-Janson, located on the hill, housed the engineers in charge of supervising the work, then, once the work was completed, the staff and finally the officers' mess. There were also several "guinguettes" (dance halls) for the workers.

In May 1844, a man named Blanchet requested authorization to install a gas plant in Suresnes, a further sign of the village's transformation into an urban city. In return, he agreed to install six lanterns in the town, a lighting system that was later extended to other areas. At the request of residents, the municipal council re-established the fire department on June 9, 1845. Until then, only the pump had been maintained for use in the event of disasters. It was abolished by a prefectural decision in 1939 and replaced in 1951 by the Paris fire department regiment, whose headquarters are at Puteaux town hall. Incidents broke out in Suresnes after the 1846 elections, and the mayor, Jeanne, was forced to step down. The prefect appointed Lamarre to replace him on June 21, 1846, with Sentou succeeding him in February 1847 under the same conditions. On May 27, 1847, the notary de Saint-Andrieu was appointed mayor.

Under the July Monarchy, Suresnes remained a village bearing heavy burdens, its charity office noting “the high cost of food, growing unemployment and the increasing number of destitute families.”

== Second Republic ==
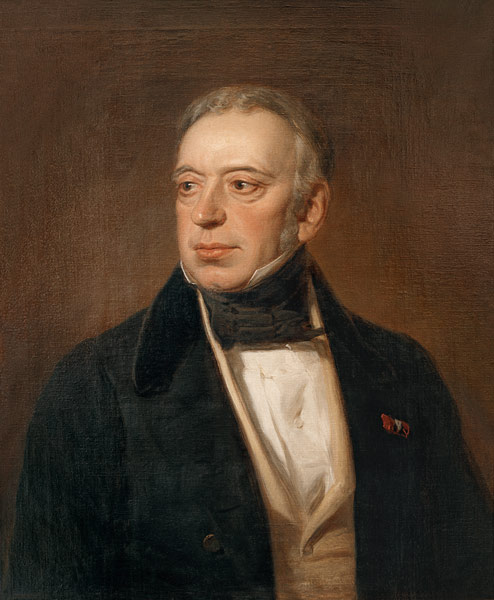
The banker Salomon de Rothschild, whose Suresnes castle was destroyed during the revolution of 1848.

During the Revolution of 1848, on February 25, men gathered at Place de Puteaux, shouting hostile abuse at the Rothschild family and expressing their intention to collect arms and ammunition from Mont Valérien, where only 30 men of the Suresnes National Guard (with rifles without cartridges) were stationed. In front of the Rothschild château, they make threats. The mayor of Suresnes gave them weapons in the hope that this would calm them, but they continued to grow bolder as they made their way to the fort, with the national guards not intervening to maintain order. Once on the hill, the rioters seized uniforms and weapons and returned to the village at Place Henri-IV. Some of them then managed to break into the Rothschilds' park, slaughtering rare animals and looting the mansion before setting it on fire. A trial followed, and 22 rioters were convicted. The Château Royal de Neuilly was set on fire at the same time, and the vandals were also under the influence of drink. Rothschild's lawsuit against the commune was unsuccessful, and his estate was abandoned: all that remained was a park with a Swiss chalet, a lake surrounded by willows, an orangery, a greenhouse, and a sheepfold, the château having disappeared. The rare plants were transported to his brother James de Rothschild's property in Boulogne. The park then became a regular playground for the children of Suresnes before being replaced by factories at the end of the 19th century.

The Suresnes National Guard joined that of Paris during the violent days of June 23–27, but without loss of life. However, the mayor was required to report the house numbers where the insurrection had taken hold, with the sub-prefect noting that this information must not be lost for the future". For the rest of the revolution, the commune had to pay for the food of the men guarding the fort, as well as the bread of the workers employed in the national workshops.

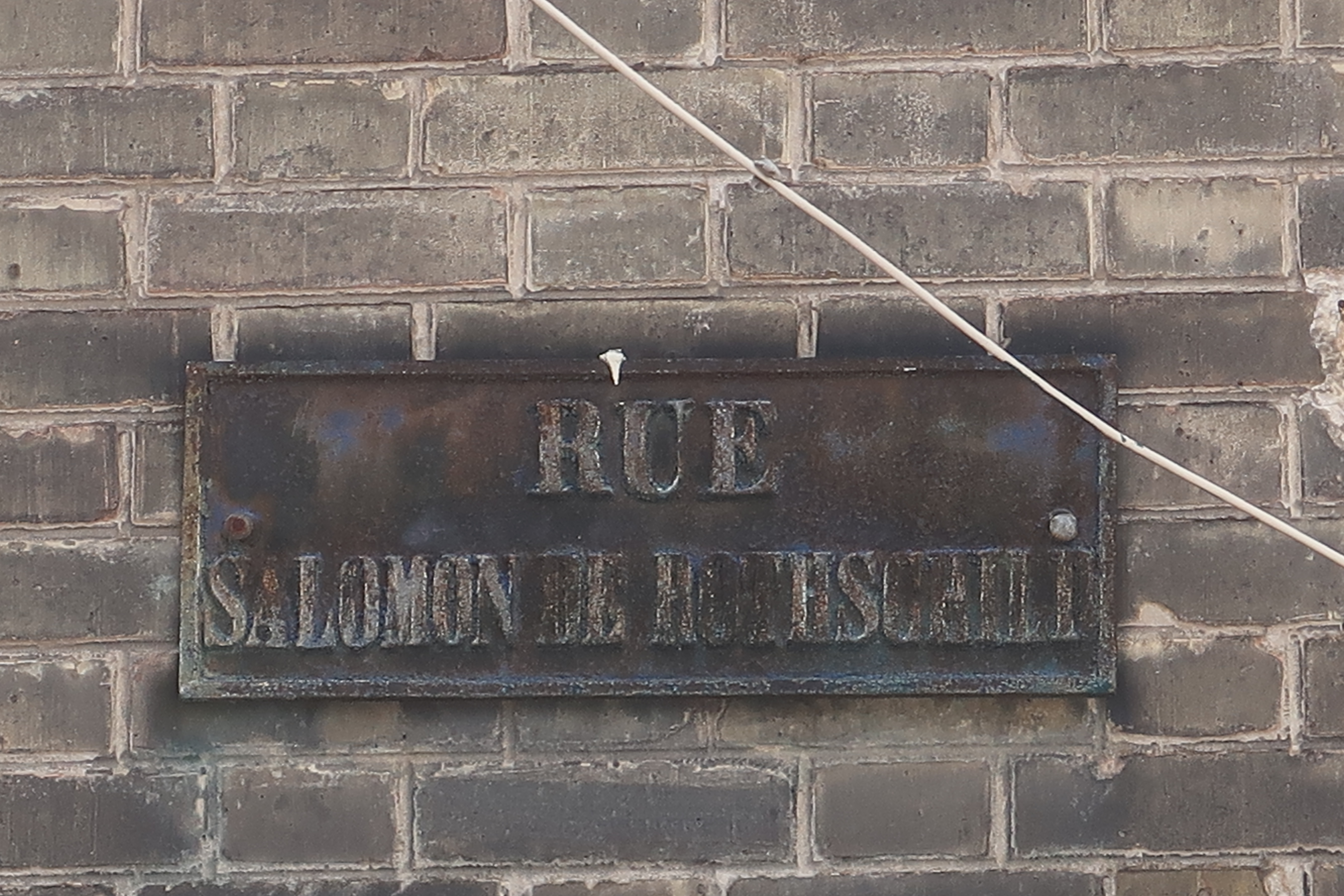
Plaque on Rue Salomon-de-Rothschild, which pays tribute to him, at the level of his former property.

A year after its establishment, the anniversary of the Second Republic was celebrated in Suresnes with a ceremony, during which the government allocated 150 francs to be distributed to people in poverty. On February 21, 1850, a similar ceremony took place, this time in memory of the citizens who had died during the revolt. Louis-Napoléon Bonaparte's desire for a well-trained professional army competed with the gendarmerie, considered safer, while the National Guard, including that of Suresnes, lost importance. When the 1853 budget was presented, provision was made for a roadmender to be assigned to the regular maintenance of the Suresnes roads, a further step towards cleaner streets.

A suspension bridge, the first in Suresnes' history, was inaugurated in 1842. At the time, there were many complaints about the difficulty for cars passing through Suresnes to reach Rueil and then Saint-Germain, notably because of the steep slope of the Rue de la Tuilerie, (Note: Current Rue Jean-Jacques Rousseau.) as the Boulevard de Versailles (Note: Current Henri-Sellier Boulevard.) had still not been built. In 1853, Mrs. Fluteaux, Dansac et Cie replaced Blanchet to supply gas to Suresnes, whose plant was located on the banks of the Seine, on the border with Saint-Cloud.

== Second Empire ==
With the coup d'état of December 2, 1851, Prince Louis Napoleon granted himself greater powers. On October 10, the Suresnes town council sent him "the expression of its eternal gratitude for the services he rendered to France on December 2, 1851, by saving her from the misfortunes she was threatened with". For the proclamation of the Empire on the following December 2, bleachers with canopies and tapestries were erected for a ceremony attended by the fort's officers, and money and food were distributed to people experiencing poverty.

At the time, many homes had wells drilled into their cellars or gardens, although some were viewed with suspicion, with some Suresnois taking advantage of the opportunity to have their sewage drained into them. For large-scale needs, a system of distributing water from the Seine had been set up by merchants, who filled barrels and then passed them through the village, each inhabitant using an earthenware filter to purify it. In 1853, a project was proposed to the mayor to create drains, sewers, and standpipes, but no further action was taken. Citizen Tournemire, who owned a well-known bathhouse with a steam boiler, obtained authorization to install a pipe to draw water from the river.

The urban structure of Suresnes continued to change: in addition to the destruction of the Rothschild estate, in 1854, Pagès gave up his neighboring property, whose park was parcelled out, with the northern part of the commune becoming constructible (a request for the establishment of a candle factory was made as early as December). Near the railway line, built in 1839, landowners and winegrowers began to sell off their plots, on which middle-class Parisians built villas with beautiful views of the capital and cleaner air. This attraction was reinforced by the development of “guinguettes” (dance halls), frequented by the capital's inhabitants and the fort's garrison, sometimes leading to drunken disturbances.

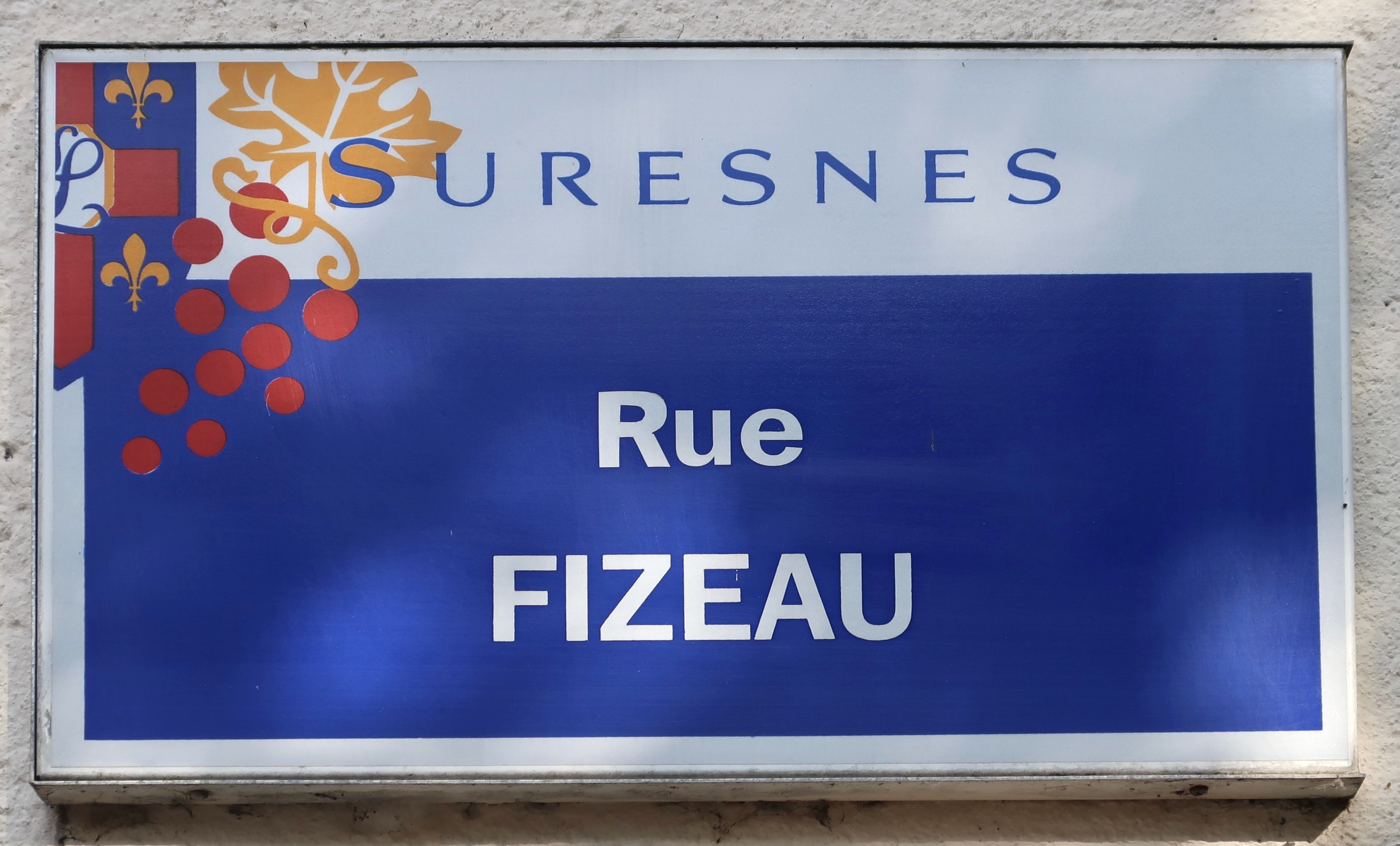
Plaque on Rue Fizeau, which pays tribute to the physicist who carried out one of his scientific experiments in Suresnes.

The school population continued to grow, notably due to the installation of factories and the resulting increase in the number of workers. From 1,500-1,600 inhabitants in the early 1830s, Suresnes had 2,032 by 1856-1857, including 500 workers and merchants. The number of winegrowers declined, while the number of wine merchants tripled. In 1854, the commune acquired the country house of medical professor Louis Aimé Fizeau and converted it into the town hall the following year. (Note: The house was located on the old market square, where the fountains of the Place du 8-Mai-1945 are today, at the intersection of the streets Émile-Zola and Desbassayns-de-Richemont. It housed the town hall's headquarters until 1889. In 1878, part of the building, including the bell tower, was destroyed to enlarge the Rue de Rueil. The rest, falling into ruins, subsequently disappeared. The Suresnes museum preserves a 1931 sketch representing the house.) In 1849, his son, the scientist Hippolyte Fizeau, made the first terrestrial measurement of the speed of light: he had installed a device emitting light rays in a bell tower at the top of the building, to reflect them in a mirror placed more than 8 km away, on the Butte Montmartre. The acquisition of this house by the municipality freed up the former town hall building, thus increasing the space available for the school's pupils. Given the high financial cost of the project, a ten-year food tax was introduced in 1855. The state of conservation of the Saint-Leufroy church was also alarming, and there were already plans, 50 years before this took place, to demolish it and rebuild it elsewhere. In October 1855, the mayor issued a decree requiring street sweeping five times a week. The municipality also had the roads widened, and in 1857, tarmac was laid on several streets.

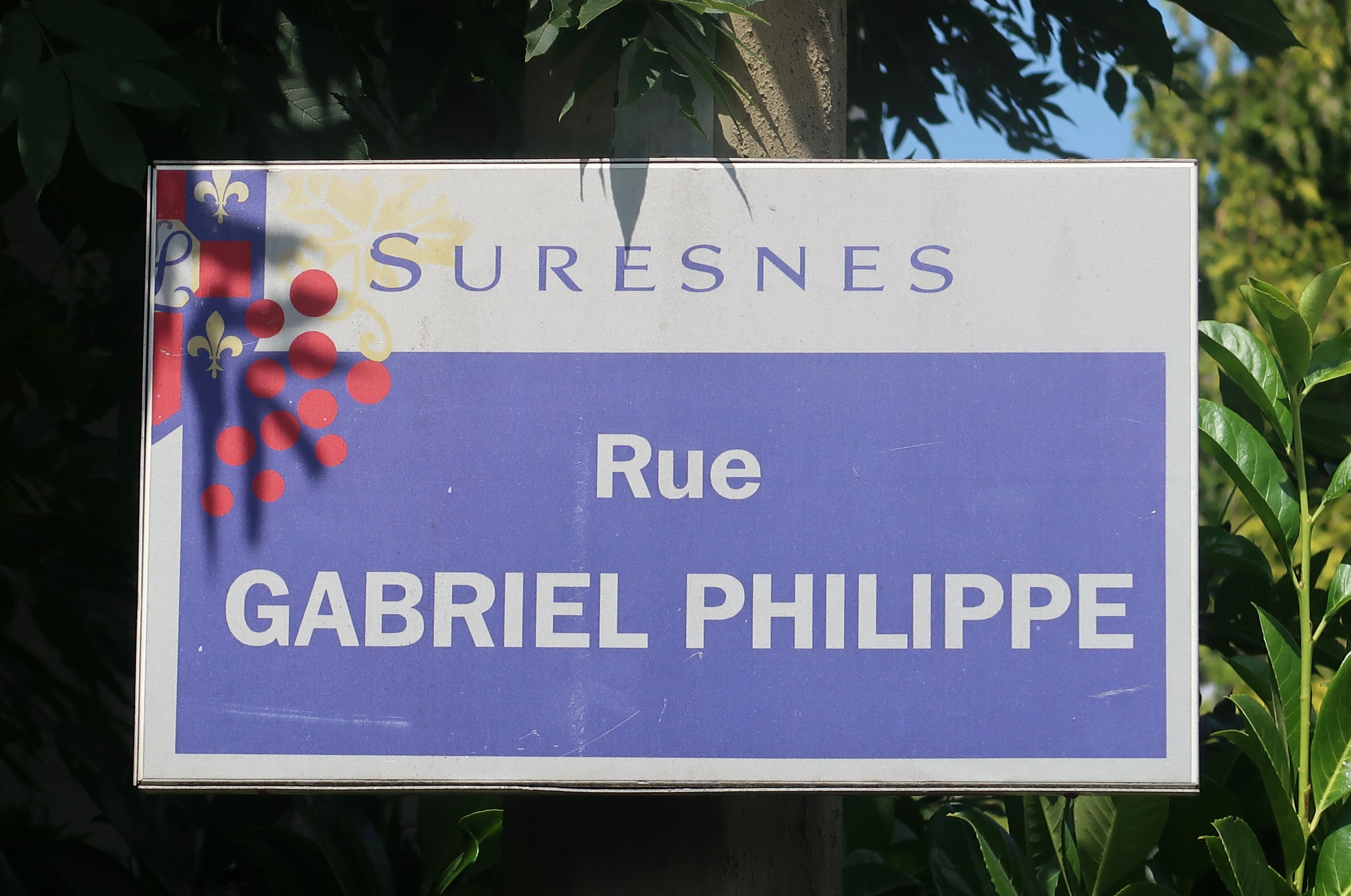
Plaque on Rue Gabriel-Philippe, in homage to the mayor in office from 1850 to 1860.

On January 10, 1860, Delaunay was appointed mayor of Suresnes, succeeding Gabriel Philippe. For the first time, he gave the municipality a stable structure by appointing a town clerk. During his tenure, the gendarmes took over from the National Guard in maintaining law and order. This included dealing with disturbances caused by Parisians who had come to enjoy themselves. The mayor also plans major town-planning works costing around 216,000 francs, hoping to finance part of the cost with a grant, as well as changes to octroi taxes.

Given the growing number of workers and the insalubrious dwellings they often inhabited, coupled with illness and job instability, a mutual aid society was created on October 20, 1863. Evening classes for workers (imitating the Association Philotechnique) were also set up, along with a municipal library in a room at the town hall. On February 13, 1865, Suresnes' first market was opened on Rue du Bac. Operating on Wednesdays and Saturdays, it was an important innovation in the commune's development. In 1864, an agreement was reached to create a pumping station at the bottom of Rue Pagès. In 1865, the Fluteau et Danzac gas company went into liquidation, its supply being taken over for 25 years by Shopper. The same year, a private telegraph office was set up in an annex to the town hall. In 1868, the cemetery was enlarged.

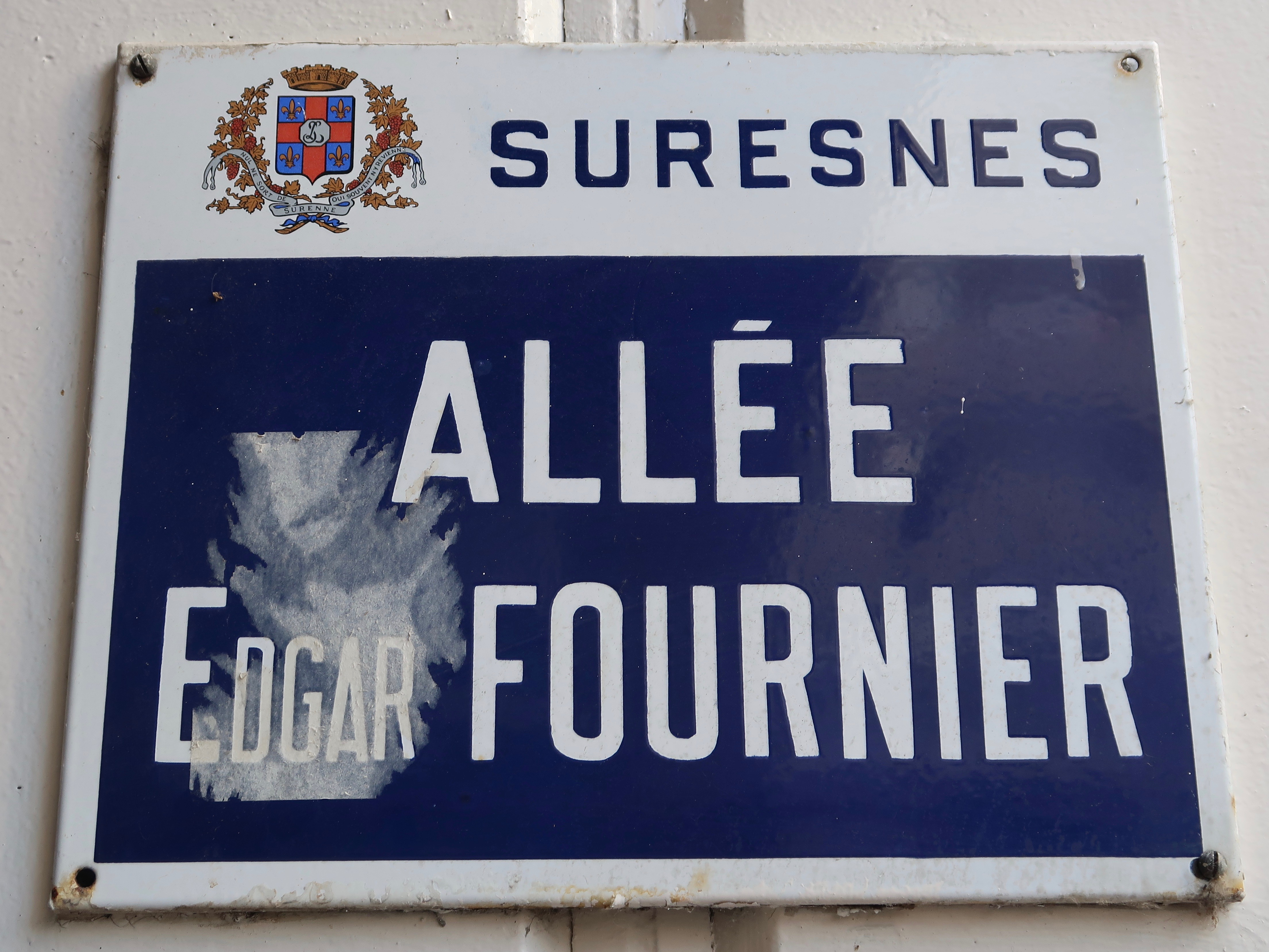
Plaque on the Edgar-Fournier alley, in homage to the first historian of Suresnes.

In the 1860s, the number of pupils continued to grow, prompting the construction of new temporary school facilities. For the boys' classes, the municipal library was requisitioned, and a temporary room was built in its place. For the time being, the construction of new schools is not on the agenda. The girls' school, like the asylum, was run by nuns. On February 21, 1869, following the example of neighboring communes, free education was extended to all, due to the growing working-class population and the fact that more than half of the 267 pupils were already benefiting from it.

In 1860, Paris annexed the villages of the former suburbs. A large number of industrialists moved their businesses to outlying villages, increasing their expenditure on education and social policy for people in need, leading Suresnes to raise the question of creating a cantonal hospice. A street development plan was also drawn up, including Rue des Sceaux d'Eau, Rue des Clos, (Note: Respectively, current Rue Étienne-Dolet and Rue Jules-Ferry.) and what is now Place Edgar-Fournier, a teacher at the Jules-Ferry school and Suresnes' first historian.

Having learned that the German army had been reinforced with trained reserves ready to join the regular army in the event of conflict, Napoleon III created the Garde Mobile with the law of February 1, 1869, comprising young men who were generally bachelors. In Suresnes, this involved 35 men.

At the end of 1868, Baroness Betty de Rothschild, who had inherited the land from her father, had four lanes opened in the grounds of the former château, including the present-day rue Salomon-de-Rothschild (with the mayor's approval, "as a tribute to the memory of this character who, during his stay in Suresnes, was constantly the providence of the poor of this commune") and Rue Benoit-Malon (then Rue du Cèdre). In the last years of the Empire, the project to build a road leading more easily to Rueil (the future Boulevard de Versailles) was approved, leading to the destruction of roads in poor condition and a large part of the presbytery. Work began before the war, was interrupted, and then resumed.

== War of 1870-1871 and the Paris Commune ==
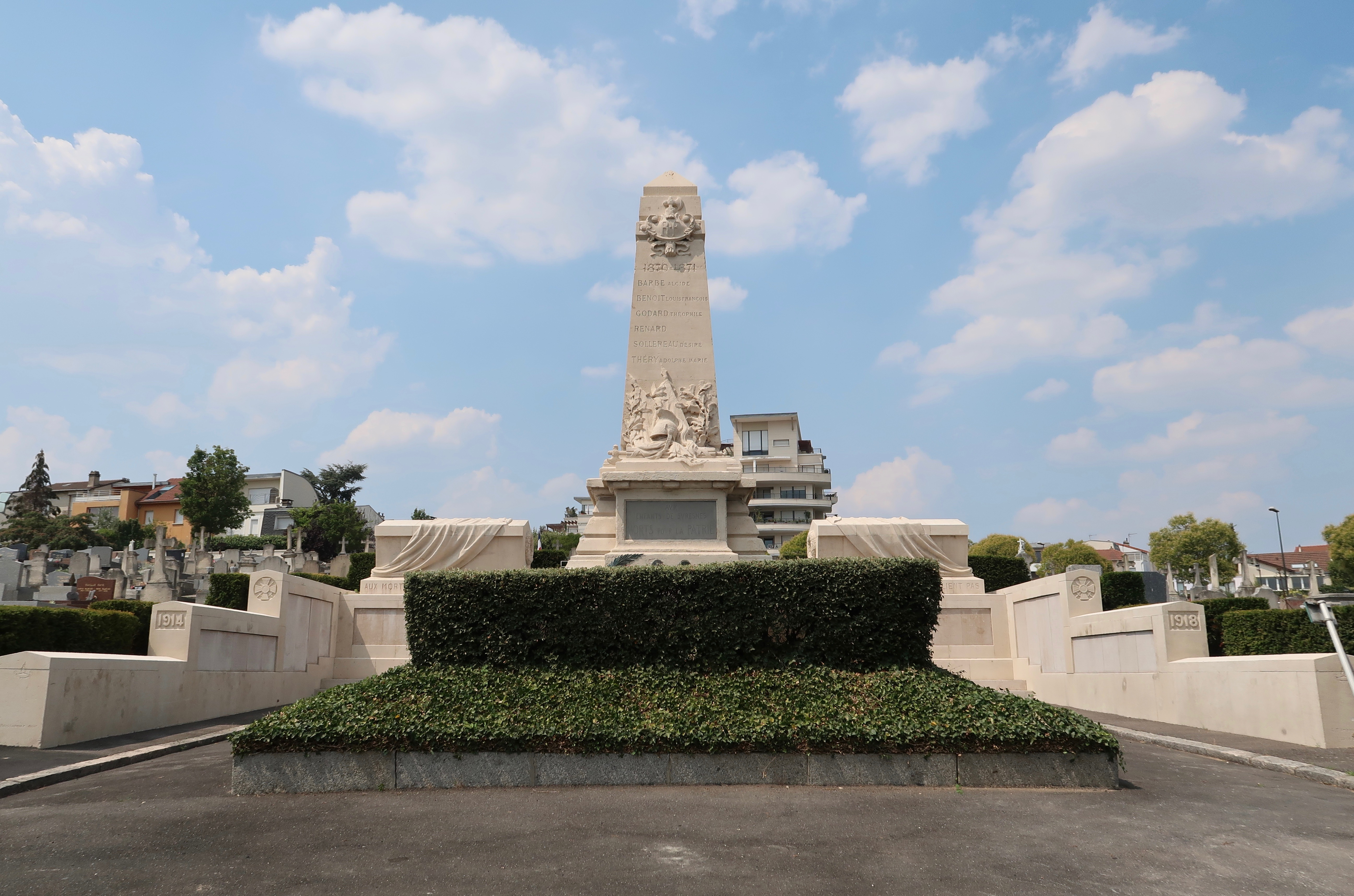
Monument in the Voltaire cemetery, in memory of the soldiers of the war of 1870-1871, during which Suresnes was the site of several clashes.

In 1870, Suresnes already had 5,000 inhabitants, including the garrison of the fort. On April 7, Jacques Lecourt was appointed mayor, inviting the population to "relieve the misery of our troops and let our generosity match the heroism of our soldiers". A patriotic cause was therefore created to help the relatives of mobilized soldiers and build up a reserve for the sick and wounded. On August 7, Sentou succeeded him as mayor. The Mont Valérien garrison having moved to eastern France, the fort is occupied by Versailles mobile guards. A law requires all citizens who are not members of the army to join the sedentary National Guard: in Suresnes, this mainly concerns workers, who are provided with clothing thanks to a subsidy from the mayor's office. On a larger scale, it gave the impression of improvised, unconnected, and undisciplined troops. After the defeat at Sedan, the Prussians swept into Paris. The National Guards of Suresnes, Nanterre, and Puteaux formed the 37th Battalion, responsible for occupying the Ternes sector, under the orders of Rear-Admiral Quillet, where they remained until the armistice. The fort was occupied by mobile units from the Saint-Maur camps, soon replaced by the Nantes and Saint-Nazaire mobile regiments due to their indiscipline. The arrival of the Germans and the routed French troops had a very tangible impact on Suresnes: “In carts, disarmed, disheveled and discouraged, the survivors of Sedan made their way to Versailles, where the sad debris of our fine regiments was being collected,” wrote G. Moussoir, author of Six mois au Mont Valérien. At the same time, many Suresnois moved to Paris, believing they would be protected by Thiers' fortifications. The municipality encouraged this exodus, even encouraging the evacuation of fodder and grain. A temporary refugee town hall was set up at 31 Rue d'Anjou (near the Madeleine and Rue de Surène, a strange coincidence noted by René Sordes), in an apartment rented by the town hall from Madame d'Andrezel (for civil status records, relief, passes, etc.).

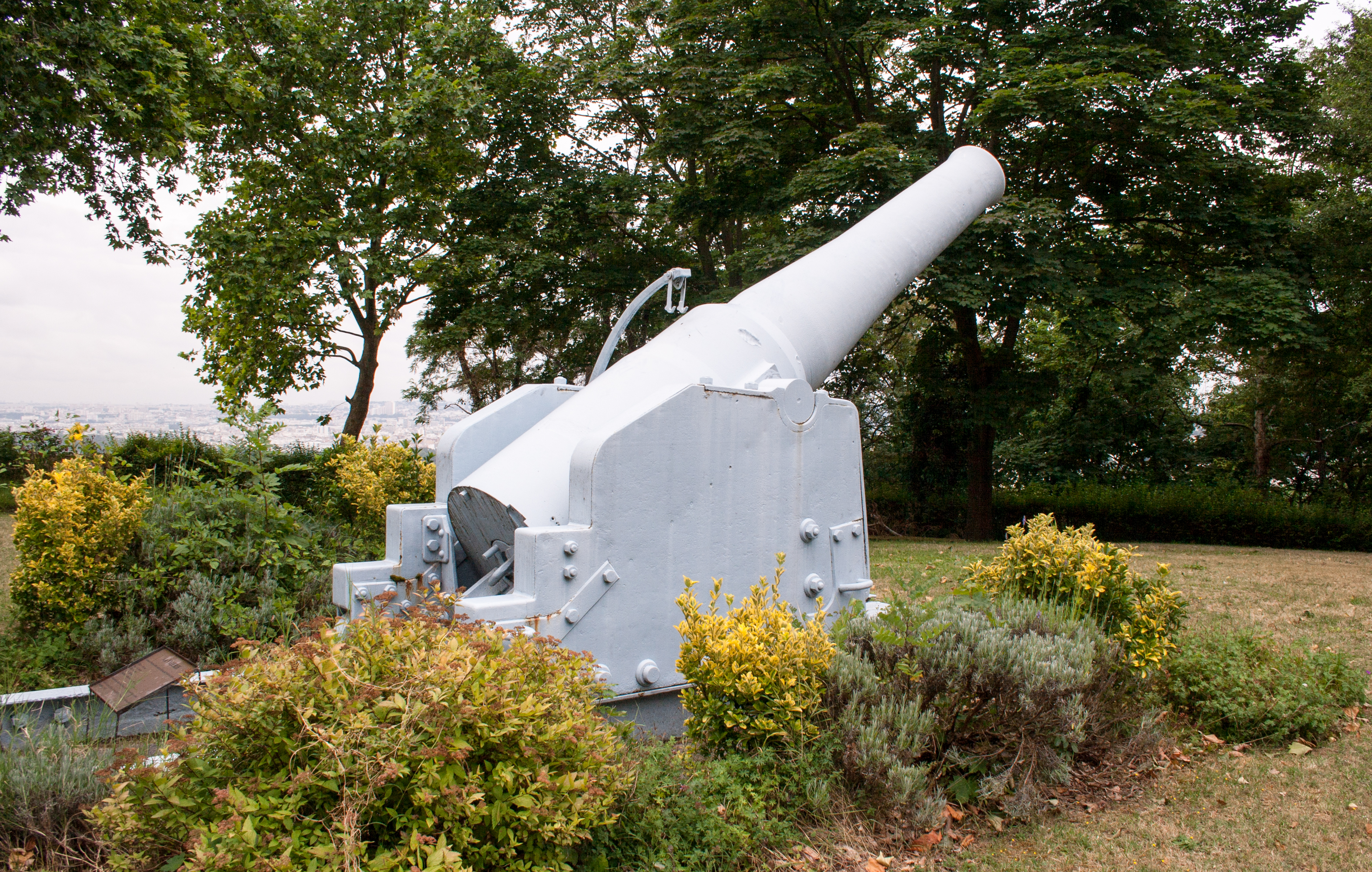
The La Valérie cannon, located in the fort, fired on several Prussian positions.

From September 10, Suresnes is occupied by soldiers. They camped at the Château de la Source and in a dye factory. On the 18th, the engineers blew up the Château des Landes, as it was located on the military terrain of Mont Valérien, and interfered with the fort's batteries' view of the Château de Saint-Cloud, where the Prussian headquarters were located. 108 artillery pieces were placed in front of the fort. On October 9, a detachment of the Suresnes National Guard, then at Les Ternes, came to town to collect wood and potatoes for the battalion. 50 men were also seconded to the municipality after properties were looted. The next day, cannon shells destroy the “Lanterne de Démosthène” in the Parc de Saint-Cloud, as it could have served as an observatory for the Prussians. On the 17th, the mayor decided to have two of the church's three bells melted down to build a cannon bearing the name of Suresnes; however, this did not happen, and traces of the bells were lost. On October 21, on the other side of the mountain, the Battle of Buzenval took place, with the participation of General Louis Jules Trochu, who had earlier observed the battlefield from the fortress.

On October 26, the majority of the municipal council decided that the running of the schools and the asylum would henceforth be entrusted to laypeople rather than clerics. Shortly afterward, the mayor expressed his satisfaction with Suresnes' financial health - the first time this optimism appeared in the archives. On November 10, the fort received a 24-mm naval gun with a range of 7.5–8 km and a projectile weight of 144 kg; it was christened Valérie. It fired as far as the Saint-Germain terrace, near the Henri IV pavilion (then the Prussian officers' mess), at boats built on the Île de la Loge, the Château de Beauregard, the Breteuil battery, and the Meudon battery. After 1871, the Valerie was exhibited in a Berlin square, returned to Paris after the Treaty of Versailles in 1920, made its way back to Germany after Hitler's victory, then returned to France again in 1945, being installed in the courtyard of honor of the Invalides and finally permanently in the fortress. The archives do not allow us to determine whether the famous projectile that hit William I's motorcade at the Marly aqueduct was fired from the Valérie. This artillery piece had a “sister”, the Joséphine.

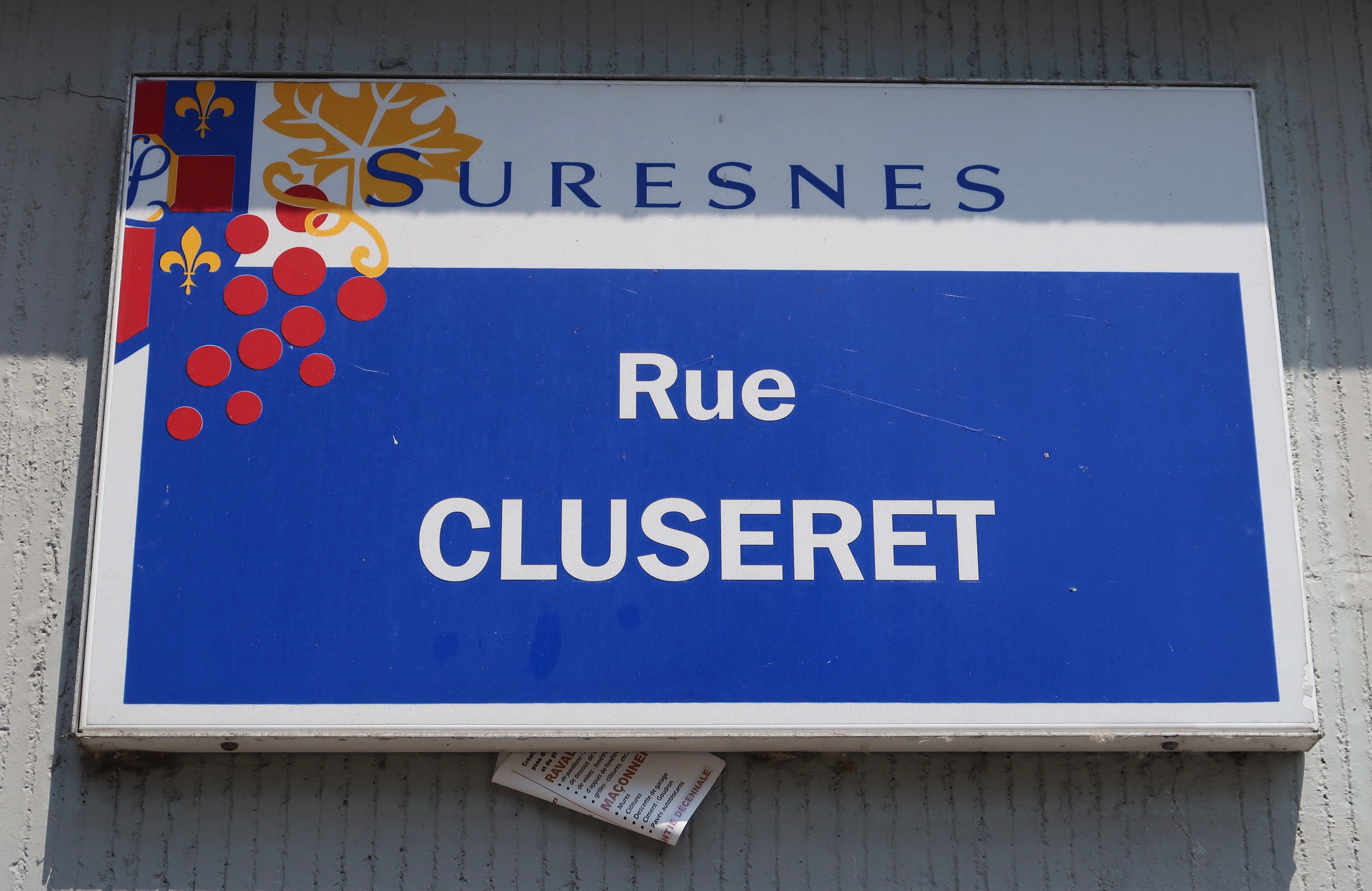
Rue Cluseret, formerly Rue de la Groue (a stony land favourable to wine growing) renamed after this general of the Commune, born in Suresnes.

The "moblots", mobile troops, marauded in the fields of Suresnes to gather the few remaining potatoes. Parisians with homes in Suresnes also came to bring back victuals. On November 24, a mobile battalion from Ille-et-Vilaine was stationed in Suresnes, occupying several houses. In December, the fort's guard was reinforced. The Croix-du-Roy brickyard (now the entrance to the cité-jardin) was used as a base by artillerymen, who used the vine stakes to keep warm. As Narcisse Meunier recounts: “We lived in Suresnes during the siege, and we can't recall without a twinge of sadness the pitiful state of our poor country." The people of Suresnes also witnessed the sorties organized by the Parisian general staff to break the Prussian embrace. On January 27, 1871, France capitulated, and two days later, the fort was occupied by the enemy. On March 1, Wilhelm of Prussia crossed the Seine, acclaimed by his army, on a mobile bridge built in Suresnes to reach Paris, the old suspension bridge having been burnt down during the conflict. German troops then occupied Suresnes, with officers staying in private homes and soldiers in factories.

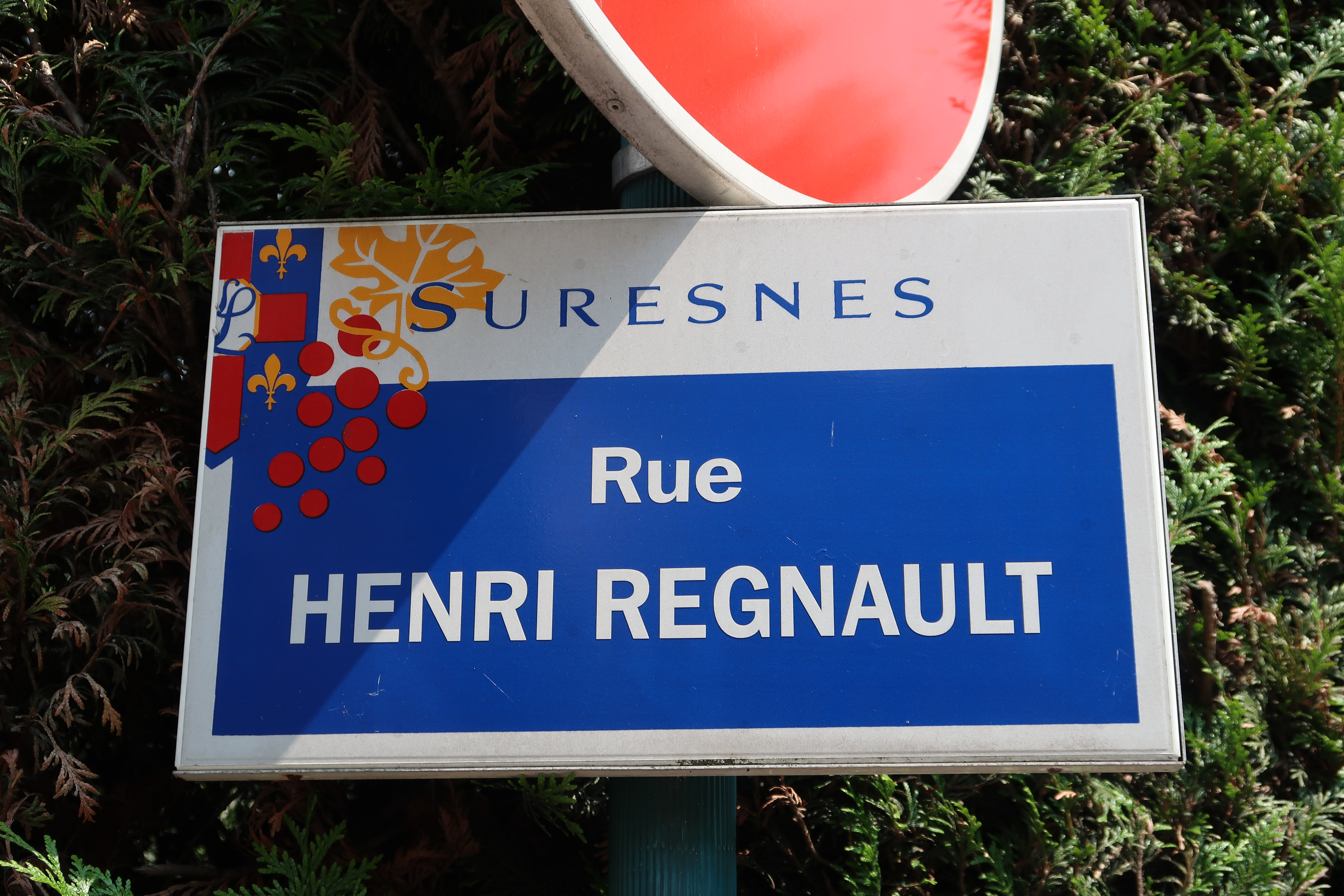
Plaque on Rue Henri-Regnault, a painter who died at the end of the conflict, near Suresnes.

On March 3, Suresnes received 5,500 francs and seeds from English Quakers. On March 12, the octroi was re-established and refugees began to return, with the municipality assuming responsibility for housing people in need. The town council also reimbursed part of the costs of the German occupation. On March 7, German troops evacuated the fort, soon to be replaced by the 113th Line Regiment, which was ordered to withdraw to Versailles, leaving the fort empty until the 119th arrived from Versailles. At the same time, the Paris Commune began. In April, the Suresnes National Guard was disarmed. On April 2, troops from the fort intervened to stop a column of federates attempting to reach Versailles. On April 7 and May 20, federate batteries at Porte Maillot, Trocadéro, and Point-du-Jour were bombarded by the fort, while Federate shells landed on the hillsides and in the city. The municipality set up a fire department for emergencies. No one was killed in Suresnes, but fearful residents asked factories to extinguish their fires at night so the smoke would not serve as a landmark. The old Mont-Valérien cemetery, however, suffered from the bombs. One resident even wrote to General Cluseret, who had rallied to the Commune, because his projectiles “did not fall on the fort, but on the cemetery where his parents' graves were” (those of the general, in the Carnot cemetery, where he has since been buried). At a time when the workers were out of work, the town council came to their assistance. At the end of May, after the battle of Buzenval, which took place not far from Suresnes, hostilities came to an end and activity resumed. The painter Henri Regnault died during this last confrontation, and the municipality decided to name a street in Suresnes after him. The Prussians occupied the fort until March 7, 1871.

== Disappearance of traditions ==
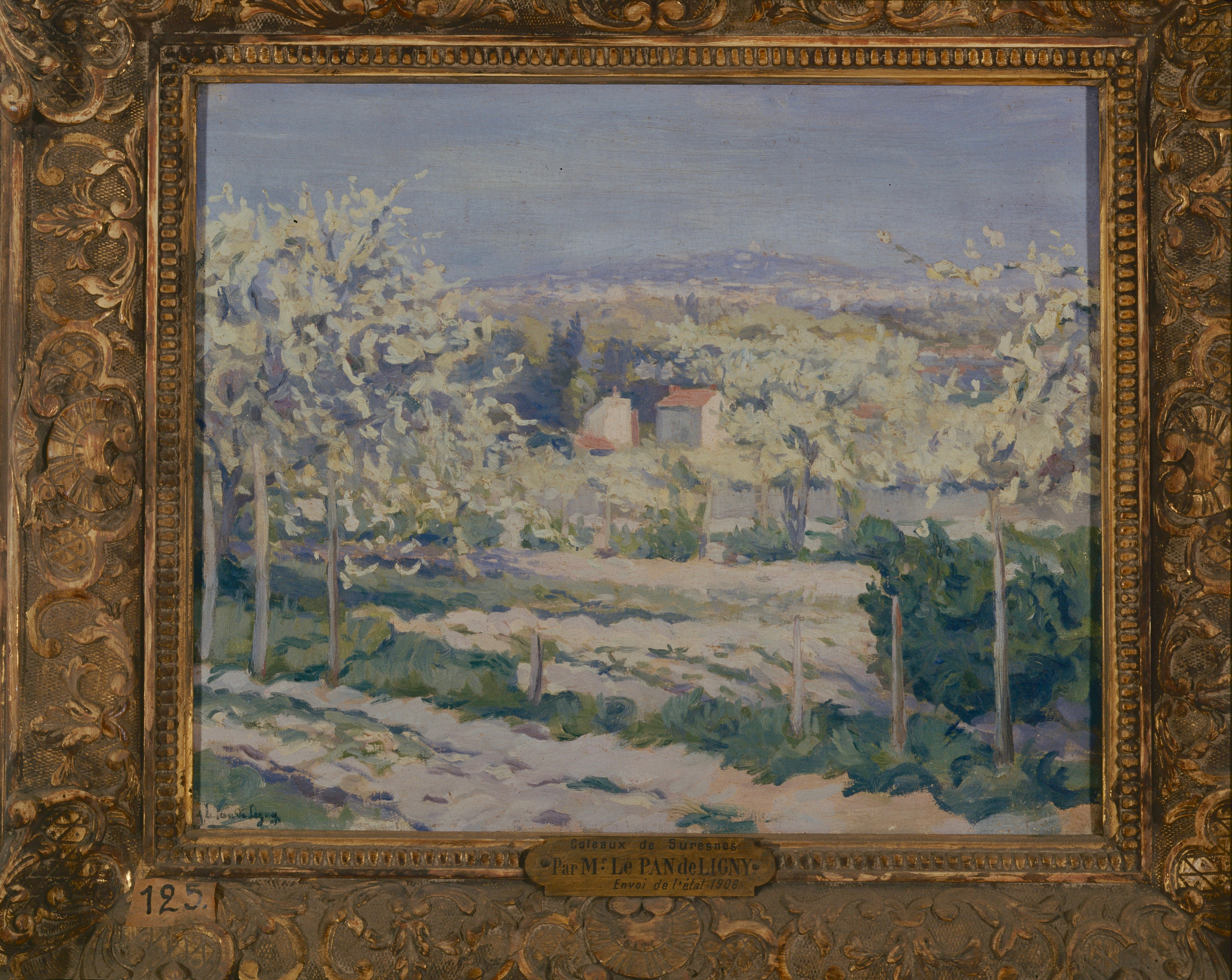
Coteaux de Suresnes, trees in bloom, canvas by Joseph Le Pan de Ligny. He is not the only one to have painted the vineyards of Suresnes, the painter Constant Troyon (whose canvases are preserved in the Louvre, Orsay, and Limoges museums) having also practiced there.

The urban modernization of the late 19th century meant that in the decades that followed, many of Suresnes' traditions disappeared, sometimes not completely but in large part. This was particularly true of vine-growing traditions. The town's heritage also lost localities, dwellings, languages, and festivals. On the subject of winegrowing in Suresnes, René Sordes notes some historical facts, notably that phylloxera had little effect on Suresnes, that purchased American plans did not acclimatize there, that powdery mildew or “blanc de la grappe” was probably first studied in France in Suresnes, and that it was in the greenhouses of the Château de Rothschild that a gardener found the remedy for a fungus using tar water (Hardy, from Versailles, found the sulfur treatment to destroy the catastrophic cryptogam once and for all). However, some customs had already disappeared, such as the so-called “Easter wine,” which meant that every year on this day, a pint of a clos belonging to the Benedictines was distributed to each inhabitant; this custom existed between the 16th and early 19th centuries. The quality of Suresnes wine goes back a long way, as testified by the actions of Nicolas de Hacqueville, head of the Hôtel-Dieu hospital in the 16th century, who had vines planted in Suresnes, believing that the wines from Suresnes, Gentilly, and Vanves were better than those from the Gâtinais and Champagne regions, to the point of banning the latter for his hospital's patients. It was also exported via the Seine to England, Denmark, and Holland. François I, Henri IV, and Louis XIV are said to have been fond of it, and several texts testify to its fame. In 1889, there were still four wine presses in Suresnes. In his Manuel annuaire de la santé pour 1852 ou médecine et pharmacie domestiques, François-Vincent Raspail also wrote: "No matter how poor you are, save a little to stock up on wine that is wine. Suresnes wine is a thousand times preferable to the more pleasant semblances of wine that the trade sells us at the weight of gold. It's not harmful if it's not pleasant; you get used to it little by little; the other poisons you by intoxicating you."

By the foot of old Silenus In short, by all the appeals of this Surene wine

— Guillaume Colletet, 1629

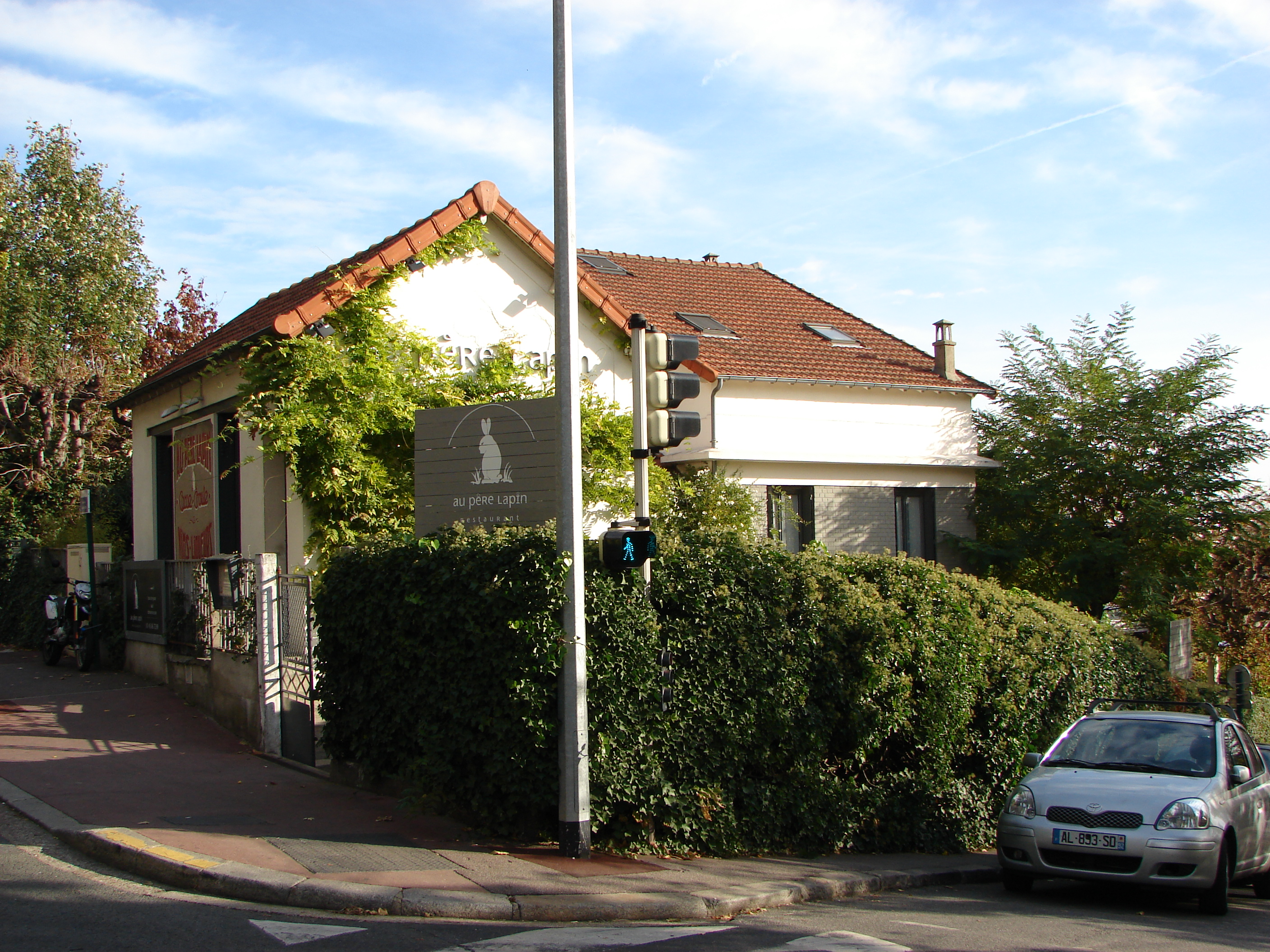
Auberge Au Père Lapin, Boulevard Washington, according to the old tradition of a navvy canteen, establishment founded in 1861.

However, it declined after the terrible winter of 1709, when everything had to be replanted. Nevertheless, many Parisians flocked to the guinguettes that sprang up after the Revolution on Sundays and public holidays (under the names "Au bon vin de Suresnes,” “La Descente du fort," "Au rendez-vous des canotiers," etc.), where they sang and danced. At that time, Suresnes wine was no longer compared to the great vintages and became more associated with pleasure. Later, Victor Hugo recalls the meals offered by his brother Abel at Mère Saguet's, praising the large omelets and the poulet à la crapaudine washed down with "Suresnes". In Les Chansons des rues et des bois, the poet again evokes this subject: "And the Surène stile / Rails the octroi post", while drinking at Edmond de Goncourt's home in Auteuil in 1873. Canoeists came to Suresnes for its food, wine, and balls, with an 1861 directory recommending nine restaurants and fifty merchants, including Au Père Lapin, where popular art paintings by Jean Dorville (1925-1926) are preserved. The house specialty is gibelotte made from rabbits hunted on Mont Valérien. Some critics, however, are critical of the "petit bleu" from Suresnes, a Piquette made from black grapes, cut with water and sugar, but popular with young revelers.

And they write to me from Surène

At the tavern, they were seen—
La Fare and good Silenus,
Who, for having drunk too much,
Could barely find the door

Of the place they knew so well.

— Epistle of the Abbot of Chaulieu on the Marquis of La Fare

An 18th-century abbot humorously wrote: "A good priest from Calvaire / Usually on feast days and Sundays / Recited mass at the château / Either by design or by adventure / One day, as we're told, / He was given new wine / Sour surene, flat rinse! / Eight days later: 'Monsieur Mathieu' / He said to the local sommelier, / 'Let's see the wine in the cruet / For you made me eat God / The other day with vinaigrette!'" Songwriter Pierre-Jean de Béranger wrote: “Farewell, Suresnes and its hillsides / Bordeaux and Meursault / The Aÿ that is sung about / Will finally be known to me / I have fifty écus / I have fifty écus in income!” or “In tavern gatherings at little cost / One warms up their muse: / To the Apollos of the cabarets / Buy a jug of Suresnes.” The operetta Le Grand Mogol (1877) also echoes Suresnes wine: "In our Parisian guinguettes / What is this tangy drink / That revives the spirits / And makes us laugh and sing? / What is this fresh liqueur / That, flowing into the glasses / Of grisettes and musketeers, / Comes to trouble both head and heart? / Chorus: / It’s the wine, so cheerful, so refined, / That fills our cups to the brim, / It’s the charming wine, the light red wine, / That we drink in Suresnes. / À tir' la rigo, as the saying goes, / The first Suresnes is drunk without water!" Around 1880, a song was finally premiered by Bourges at La Scala, noting: "Yesterday, having received my fortnight's pay, / I said to myself, to have some fun, / I'll take a trip to Suresnes, / Just to sip some p'tit bleu."

In the past, there was a tradition linked to the presence of an 18th-century statue of the Virgin with Grapes, now housed in the Musée de Suresnes. It was located in a niche in the wall of a house at 5 Rue du Puits-d'Amour, where Véronique Bernard, a former nun at Longchamp Abbey, lived. Around August 15, it was customary for winegrowers to come and hang their first bunch of grapes on the child's hand, "hoping to benefit from the Holy Family's protection for their harvest".

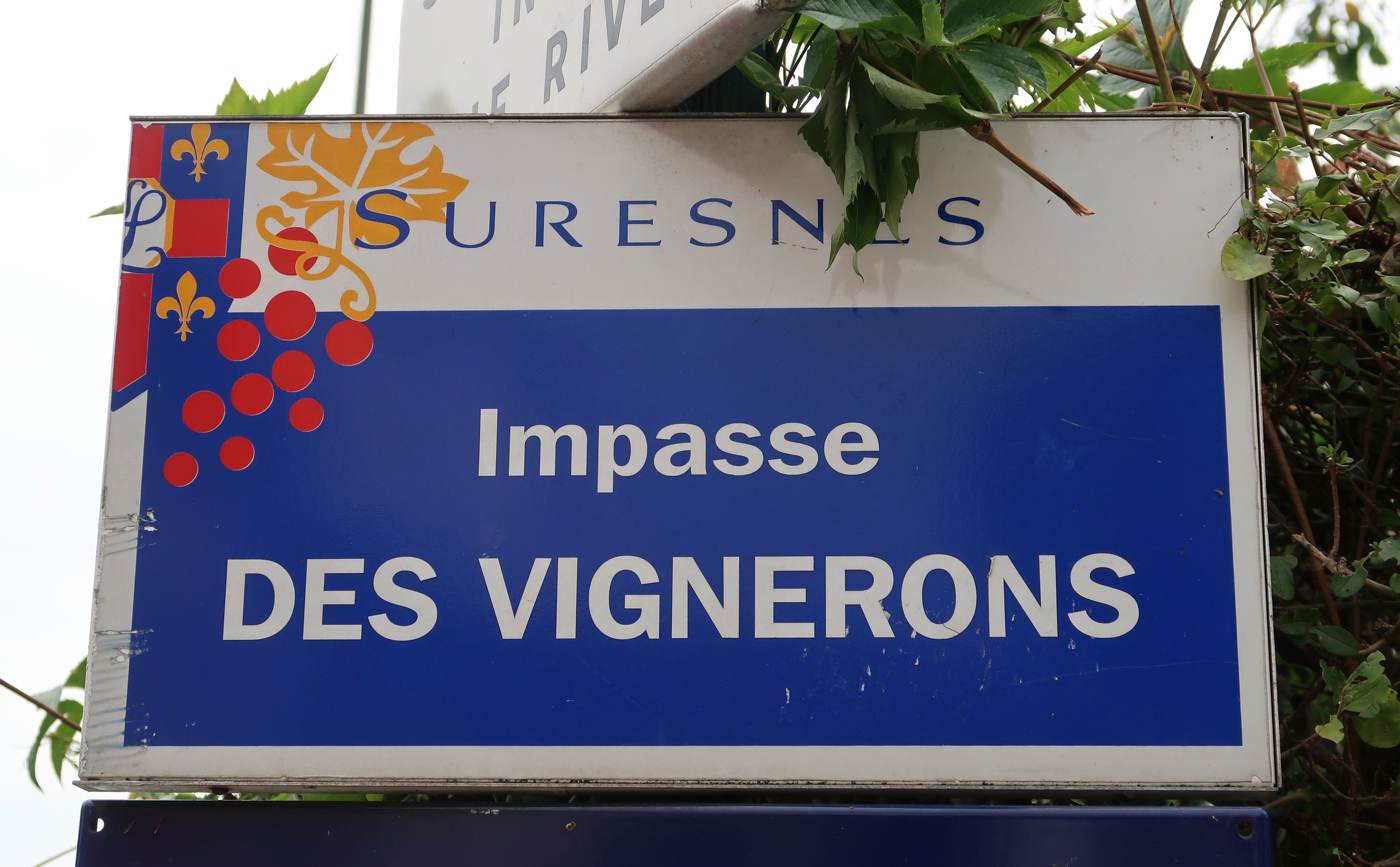
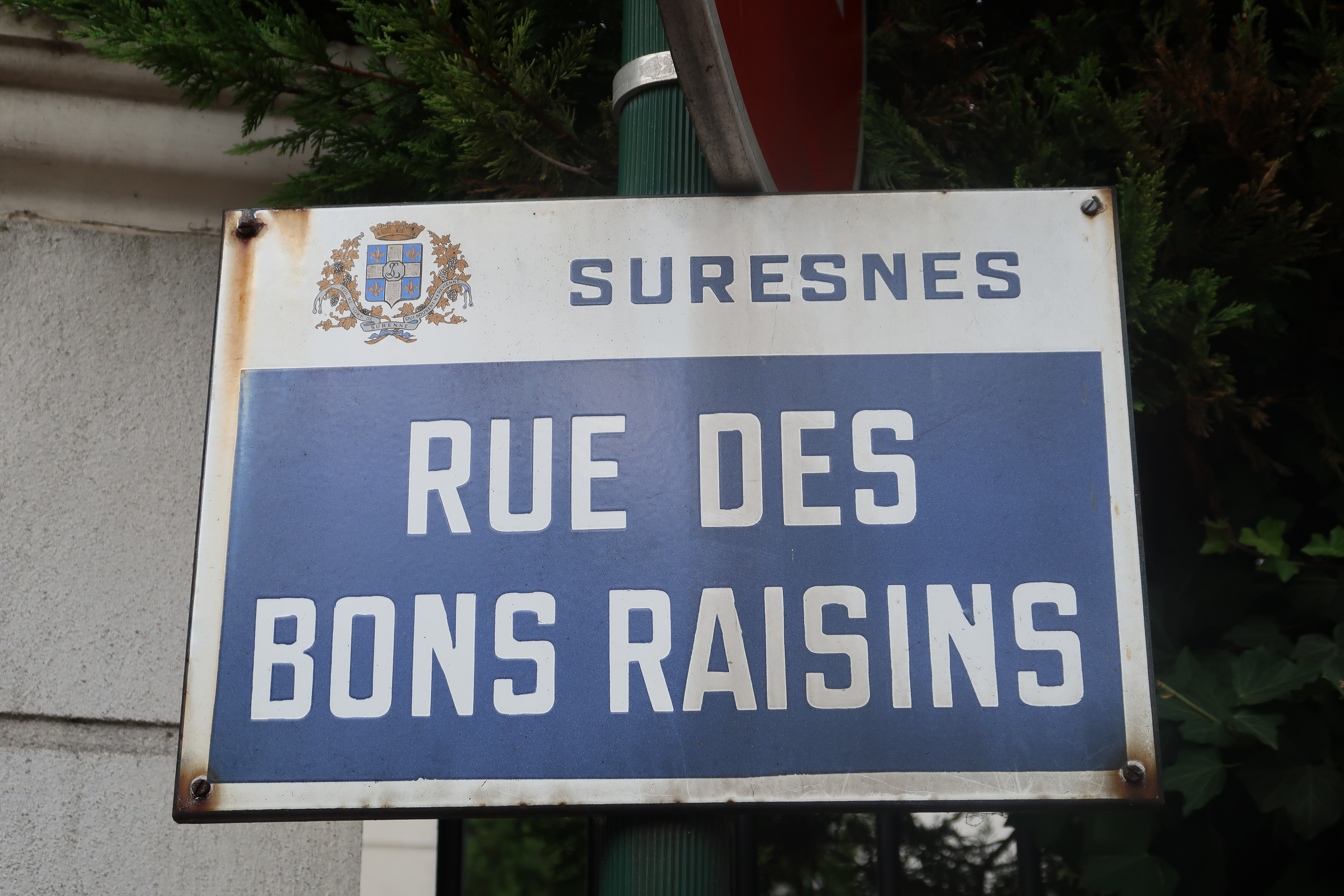
Street plaques for Impasse des Vignerons and Rue des Bons-Raisins, paying tribute to Suresnes' winemaking heritage.

Some of Suresnes' street names still refer to its wine-growing past, such as Rue des Bons-Raisins, Rue des Verjus, Rue des Bourets (a type of grape grown in Suresnes), Rue du Clos-des-Seigneurs, Rue du Clos-des-Ermites, and Rue du Port-au-Vin. In 1965, René Sordes also noted some lieux-dits and cantons (privileged place names), referring to “a particular feature of the place, natural or otherwise, a time that has passed, a particular culture, the name of an owner or a family, a famous event among others,” such as Val d'Or, la Croix-du-Roy (a cross once stood at this crossroads), les Terres-Blanches (the soil in this canton was white at shallow depths), la Fontaine-du-Tertre (about a fountain that flowed down the side of Mont Valérien) or les Bas-Roger (the woods of Sieur Roger, on the border of Suresnes and Puteaux). Rue des Chèvremont, on the northern plateau, is a reminder that it was laid out on a former goat pasture.

Houses built with stone from the Nanterre and Suresnes quarries were notorious for getting dirty, causing greenish leprosy at the base of the houses; walls covered with poor-quality plaster did not stand up well to the elements. Houses generally had a hall facing the street (kitchen and dining room), with a bedroom and storeroom behind, a courtyard with a hutch, a goat or mule (more rarely a horse), a second floor or attic, and a cellar. The houses' thresholds were relatively high to prevent flooding during storms. This is how most houses in Suresnes looked in the mid-19th century.

Typical Suresnes dishes include gibelotte of rabbit in red wine, matelote of eels, Seine friture, petit salé with cabbage, and cherries, which were eaten at guinguettes, and moules-frites with petit bleu.

The suburbs of Paris were long frequented by Normans and Picards, who came to Suresnes to work in the fields and harvest grapes, or to replace workers driven out by the war, thus influencing its accent and language: "Fontaine du Tertre" (originally "du Tartre," meaning "top of a mountain") was pronounced "Fontaine du Tertre", and ‘Suresnes’ was pronounced "Surane" in the 18th century. As the suburbs integrated into the capital, they lost their accent, particularly with the arrival of factories and workers.

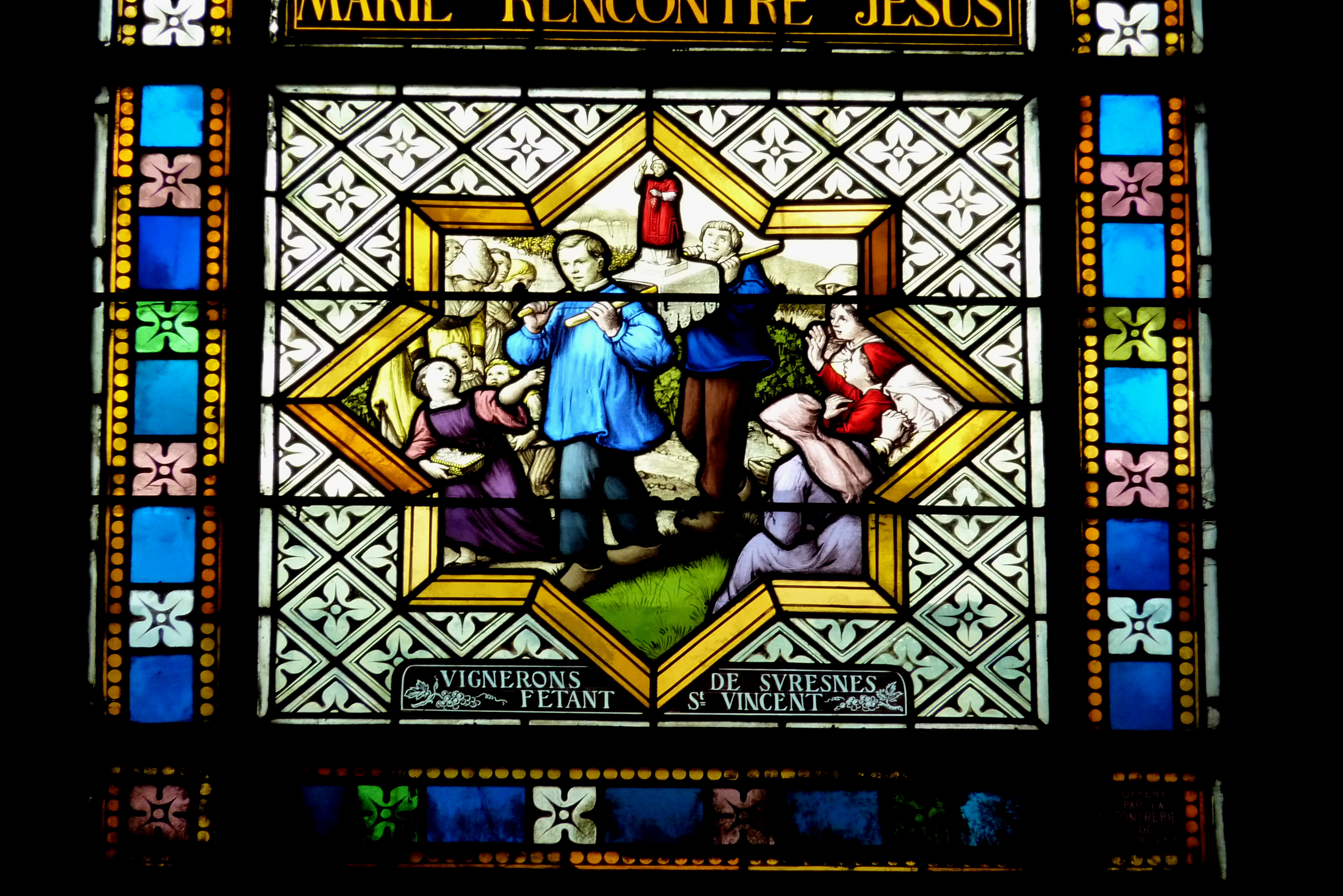
Stained glass window in the church of the Immaculate Heart of Mary depicting the winegrowers of Suresnes celebrating Saint Vincent's Day.

In addition to the Saint-Vincent festival and traditional Christian feasts and weddings, Suresnes also had several customs, such as the period between 10 and 10:15 a.m. on Palm Sunday, when the direction of the wind was recorded to predict the weather for the rest of the year. From the mid-19th century onwards, there was also the patron saint's day of Saint Leufroy at the end of June, with bakery stalls, circuses, theaters, lotteries, billiards, and wooden horses, as well as a fireworks display that brought the festival to a close. Games were organized such as the mât de cocagne (a 4-5-meter mast erected in Place Henri-IV, coated with black soap, which had to be climbed to win prizes such as bottles of alcohol or hams), sack races (girls had to cut ribbons near the starting point, blindfolded, at the same time), the baquet game (which took place in Rue du Pont, near the crossroads with Rue des Bourets: you had to insert a pole into a hole and, if you missed, you were covered with the liquid filled in a baquet, which the dyers had turned blue, red, yellow or green), the joutes à la lance (which took place in the basin between the bridge and the dam, in front of a sometimes Parisian audience as well as the town councilors: Teams, sometimes from neighboring towns, would compete on boats to knock down their opponents 300 meters apart.) René Sordes also recalls the street cries of the small trades, for the sale of fish, for example (“Hereng qui glace, hareng nouveau”).

Among the trades typical of Suresnes' bygone days were, in addition to winegrowers, laundry workers (between the end of the 18th century and 1914, they formed an important guild, with a clientele that was essentially Parisian) and feeders (fewer in number, they raised cows in enclosed cowsheds, or vacheries, until urbanization caused them to disappear).

Suresnes' many urban transformations have also prevented it from preserving an architectural tradition, as Michel Guillot, secretary of the Société Historique de Suresnes, noted in 1995: "Unlike other towns, Suresnes has no ancient architectural heritage. The old church was destroyed in 1906; a château [that of La Source] was razed in 1986; and the seigniorial house and two "Grand siècle" townhouses were razed between 1963 and 1974 due to their dilapidation. What remains of the old buildings are the Mont Valérien fort and buildings from the Third Republic, the “Republican monument” (schools, town hall, and village hall), and the workers' buildings designed by Henri Sellier.

== Third Republic (1871–1900) ==
=== Modernizations ===
==== Years 1870-1880 ====
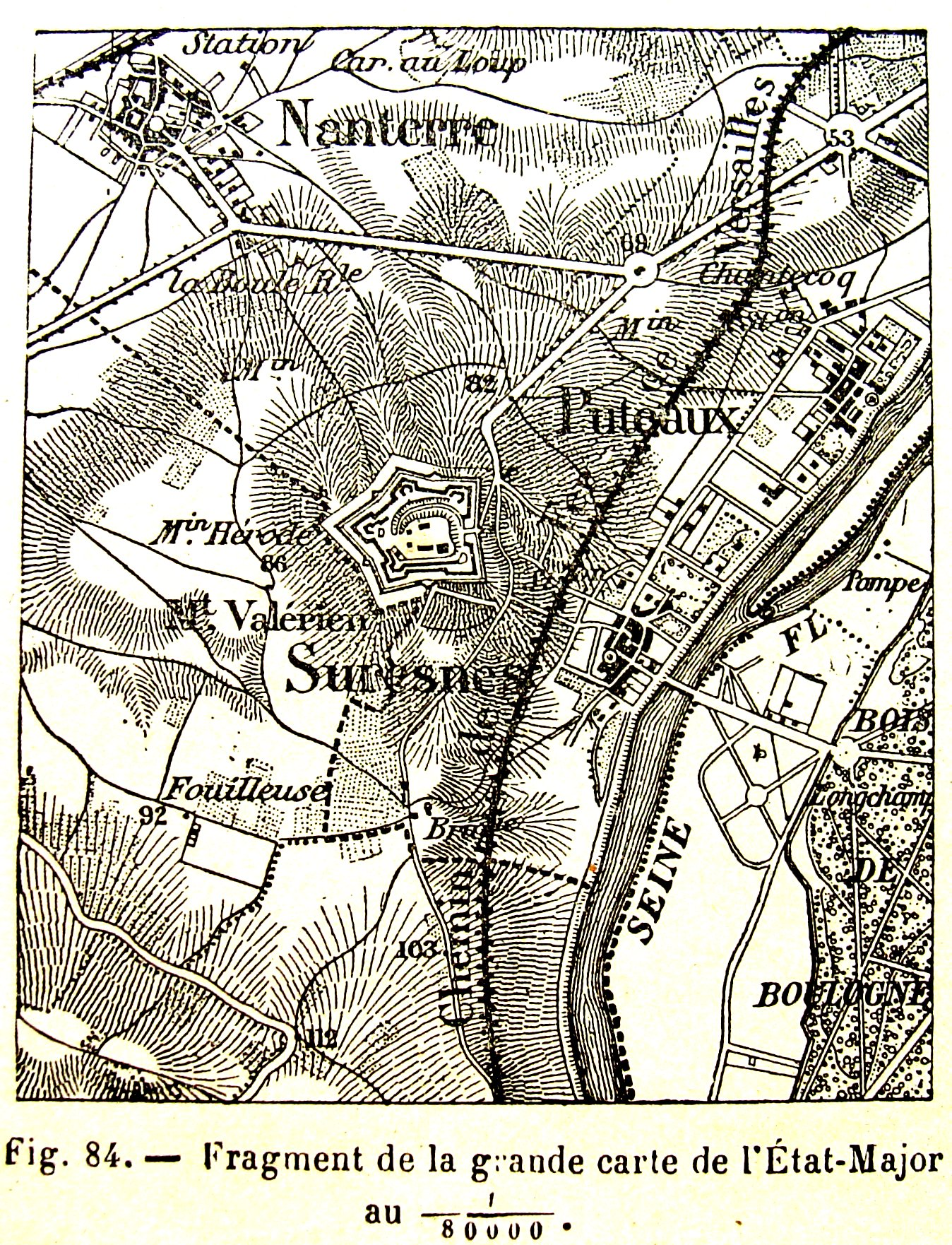
Staff map of Suresnes in La deuxième année de géographie by Pierre Foncin (1888): the fort of Mont Valérien and the communication routes are highlighted.

It was during this period that the old village of Suresnes began to disappear, both architecturally and traditionally, giving rise to the industrial town. Winegrowers were also gradually dying out: by the end of the century, there were only a hundred or so out of 11,200 inhabitants, and seven or eight after the First World War, of whom only three or four still cultivated a few vines.

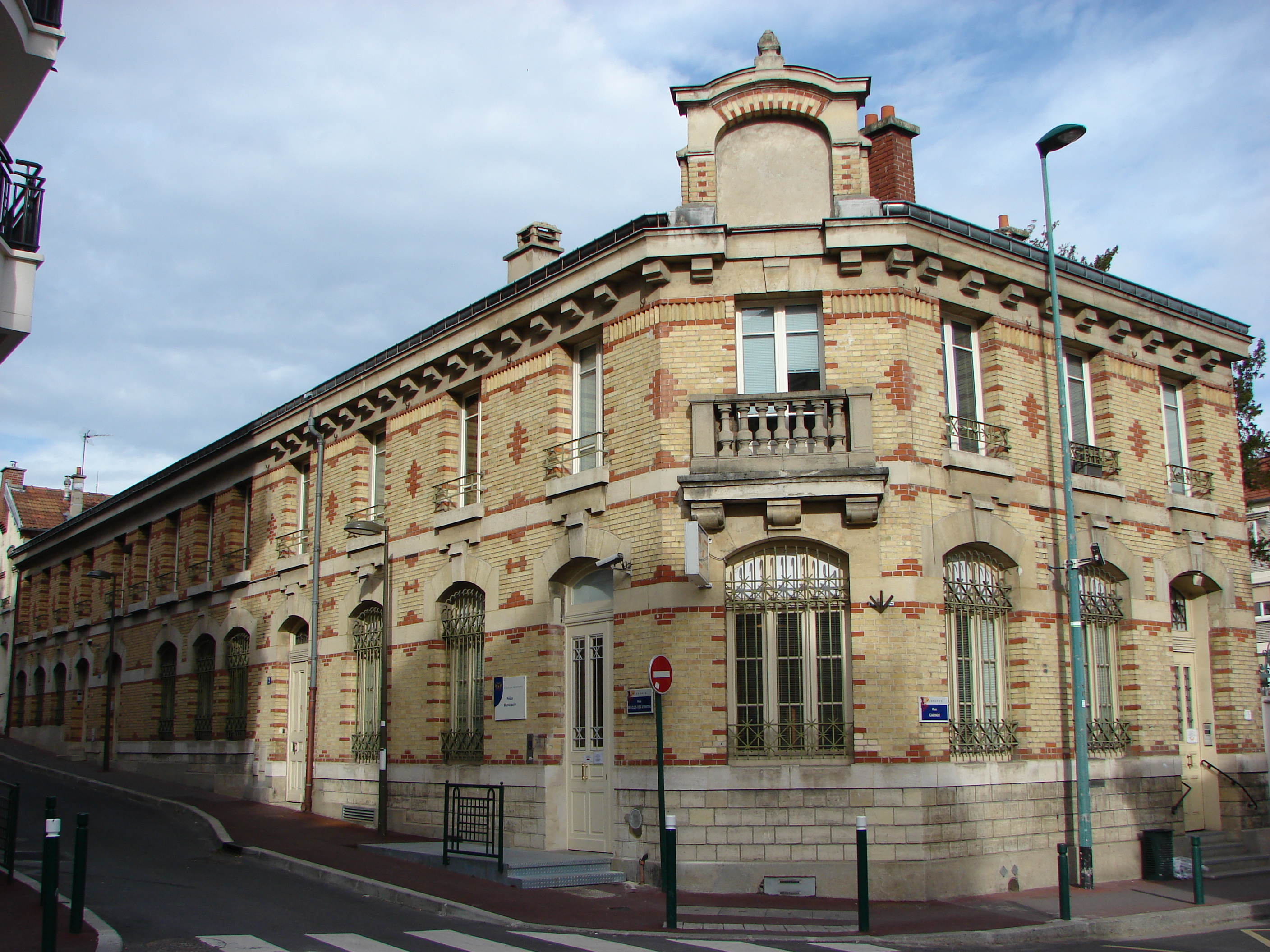
Former Suresnes post office and current headquarters of the municipal police, Rue Carnot, one of the first important buildings constructed at the start of the Third Republic.

The construction of the Boulevard de Versailles (later Boulevard Henri-Sellier) played a major role in opening up the area. Once the war was over, work resumed on this road, then known as “Grande Route No. 3”, leading to the demolition of beautiful gardens and houses looted during the conflict. On September 1, 1871, half the presbytery was demolished, despite complaints from the municipality. A new presbytery was built on land acquired with state compensation and transformed into a library after the law separating church and state, which was given a square. Terraces were also built to stabilize the soil on the hillside. The bridge over the Seine, destroyed during the war, was rebuilt. The Boulevard de Versailles was completed in 1878, with a 10-meter-wide roadway lined with plane trees. Thanks to this road, which put an end to culs-de-sac, wrote René Sordes, "Suresnes was no longer at the end of the world". A restaurateur acquired a lot near the quay, helping to turn the area into a lively district, with Longchamp turfers, crowds cheering the army on the July 14th military parade at the eponymous racecourse (inaugurated in 1857), weddings on large white floats, and lovers of guinguettes and balls.

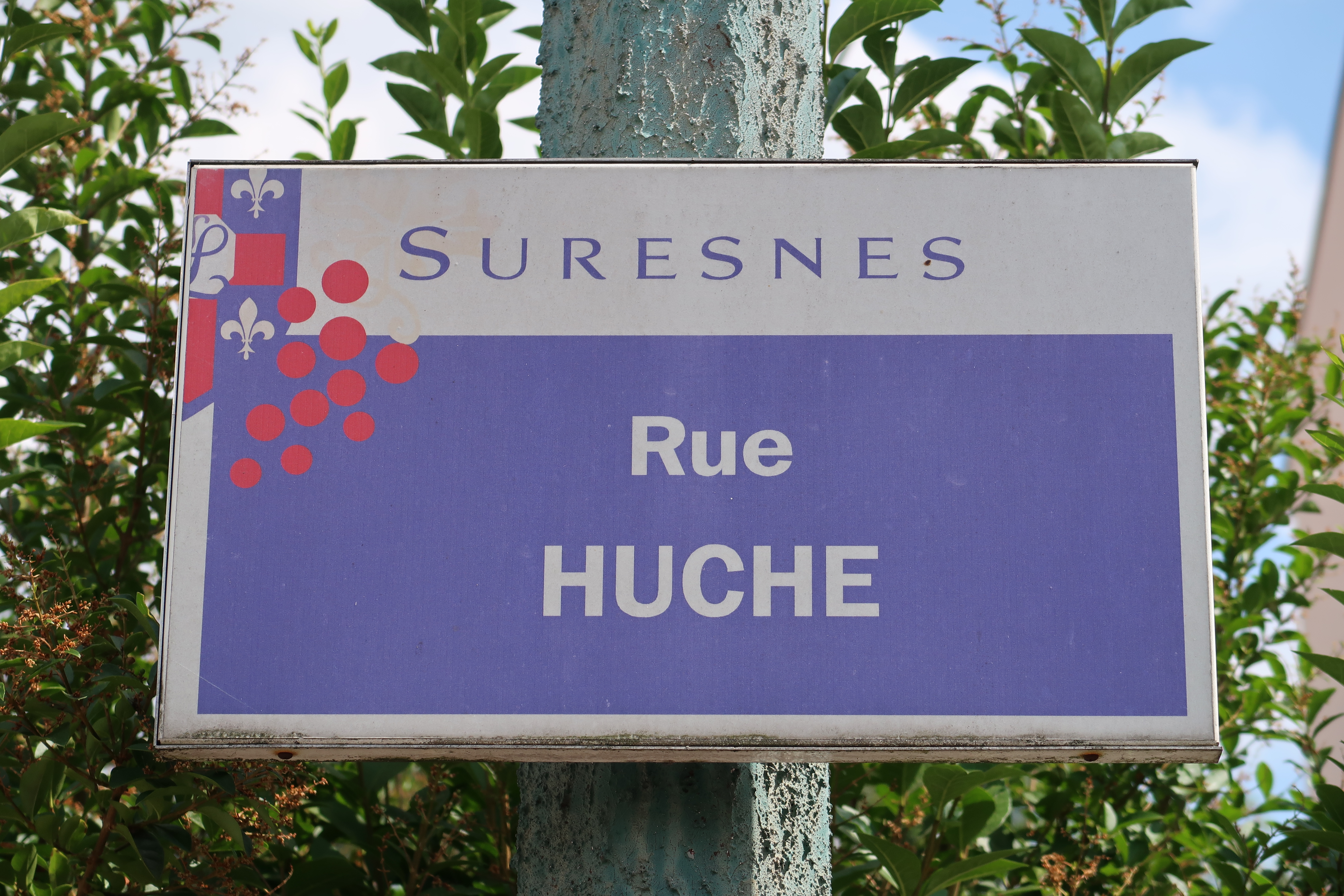
Plaque on Rue Huché, in homage to the mayor Antoine Louis Huché, in office from 1871 to 1878.

After the war, the National Guard was disbanded. On August 16, 1871, Huché was elected mayor. His responsibilities included repairing roads and paths. On December 12, 1872, it was decided to demolish the "well of love", which was done the following year; a square in the town center has since been dedicated to it. In 1873, street names were indicated by enameled sheet metal plaques; previously, inscriptions had been made directly on the wall; in 1885, they were made of cast iron, with the name in relief. In 1874, plans were made to build a new school, the foundation stone of which was laid on July 4, 1875; it was subsequently named Jules Ferry. Completed on June 28, 1876, the new school was inaugurated with a speech delivered in the presence of notables, hailing France's recovery. The old school buildings, built in 1788 and previously occupied by the town hall, were demolished in 1876 and replaced with a market. The Prefect approved a project to align and develop 61 local and rural roads. At the time, Suresnes still had a population of 4,837, and 800 soldiers occupied the fort. On October 8, 1876, Huché was re-elected. The telegraph office was relocated several times, hampering municipal services, until a new building was erected at the corner of Rue du Clos-des-Ermites and Rue Carnot. On January 6, 1878, the industrialist Guillaumet was elected mayor and re-elected on January 10, 1881. For the first time, specialized committees were set up at the town hall (finance, public works, roads, and hygiene).

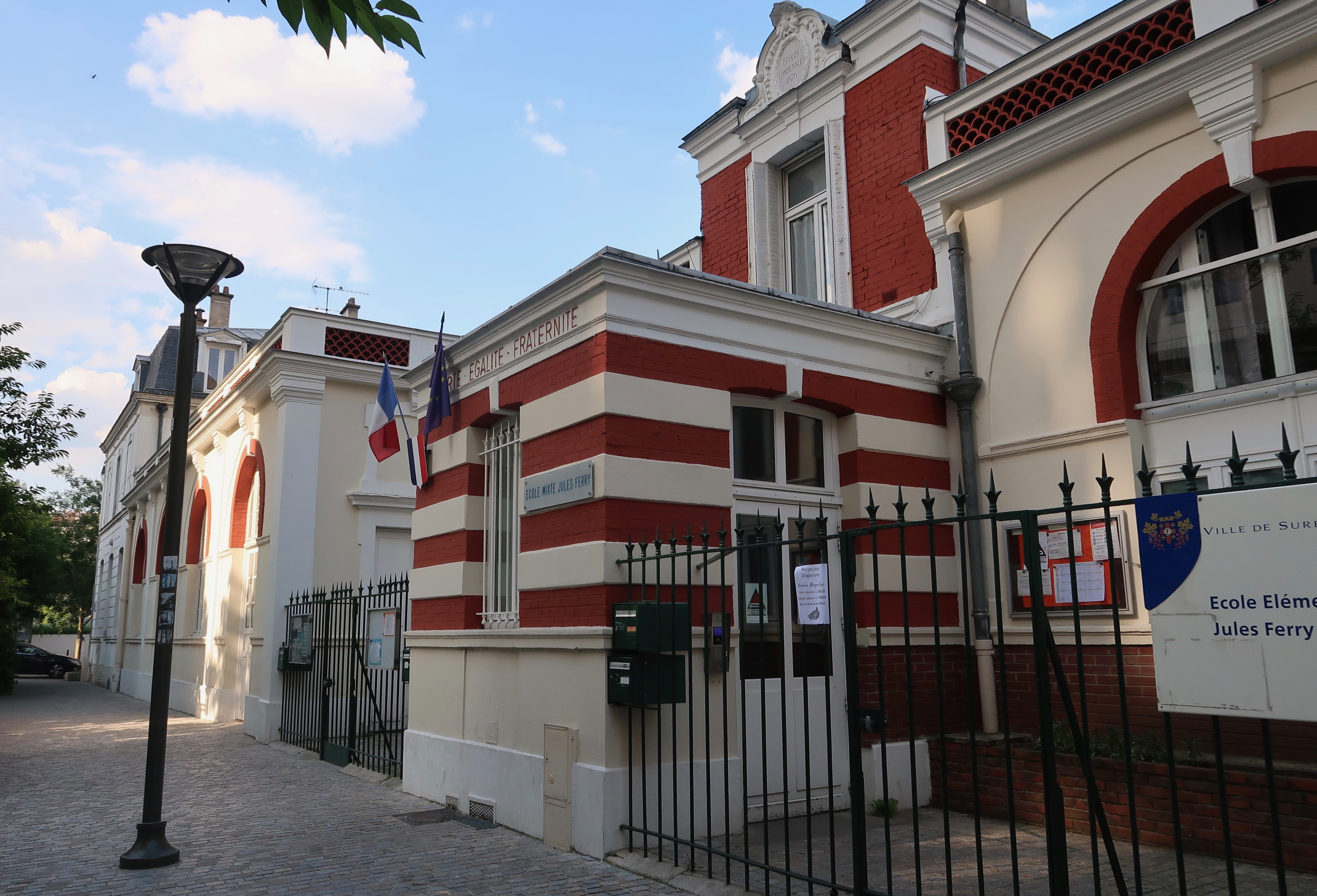
Jules-Ferry School, the oldest school building still in operation in Suresnes.

As the Fizeau town hall (in place from 1856 to 1889) was falling into disrepair, plans were made in 1878 to replace it. In 1879, a Protestant pastor settled in Puteaux, covering the congregations of both communes: 1,300 in Puteaux and 70 in Suresnes. Against a backdrop of revenge, on March 24, 1882, the prefect invited the town to introduce shooting lessons in schools: the mayor bought Andrieux rifles for the “school battalions” that had been in existence for a decade, with a non-commissioned officer from the fort coming to teach infantry maneuvers to pupils preparing for the primary school certificate. On December 18, 1882, a major explosion hit the fort's cartridge factory, killing 17 people, including 16 women working there. (Note: A stele pays tribute to them in the old cemetery of Puteaux.) In 1888, "La Fraternelle," a shooting and military training society, was created, marching and maneuvering at official events in uniform. The civilian shooting club "L'Espérance de Suresnes" was founded at the same time. Until the end of the century, a festival with a burlesque costume parade was organized to mark the drawing of lots for the conscripts' assignments.

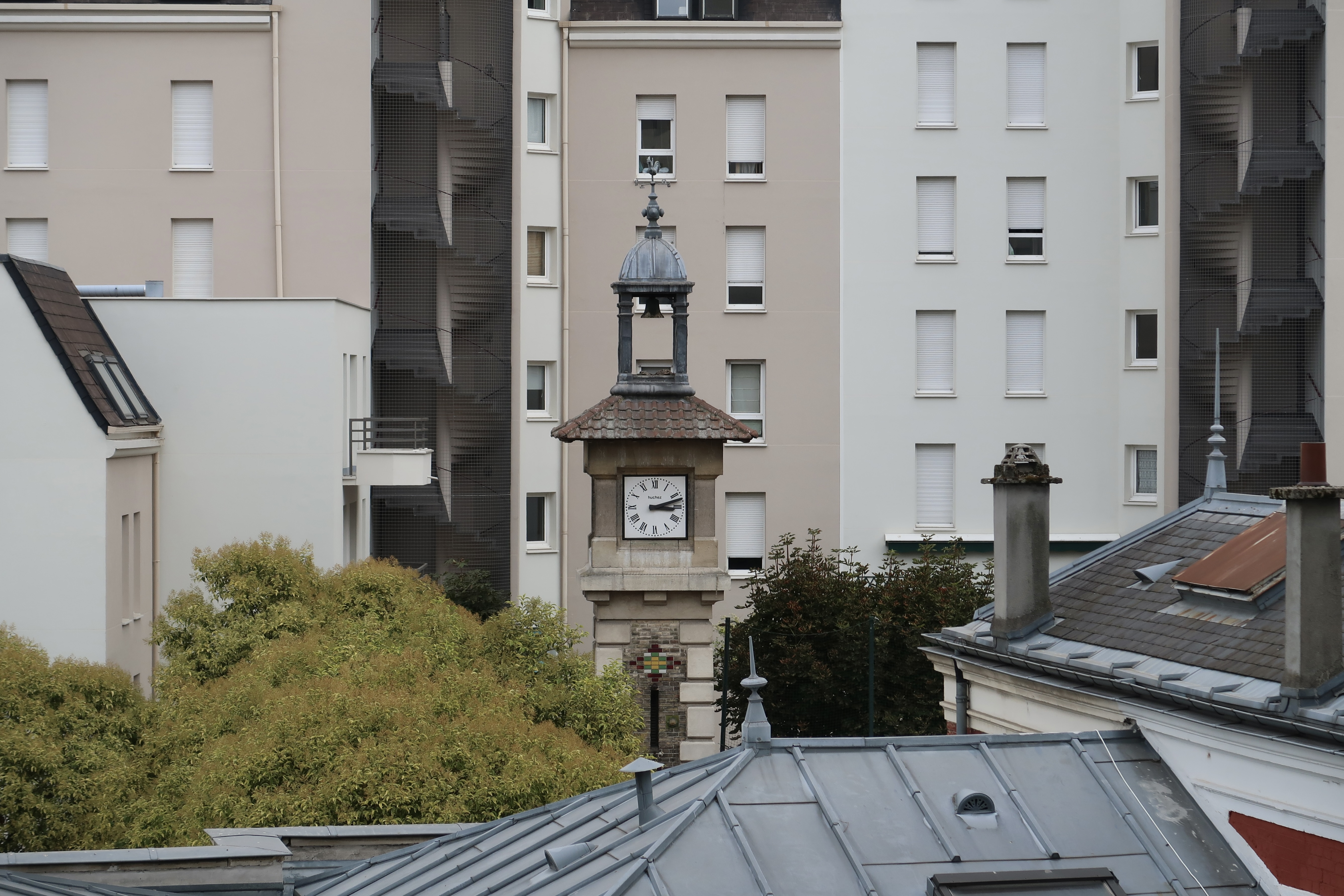
The school belfry, which housed the clock from the Saint-Leufroy church (demolished in 1906) to sound the start of classes.

On March 10, 1885, the municipality decided that for ten years, goods entering Suresnes would be subject to octroi. By 1861, four octroi offices had already been set up in Suresnes; by 1870, they were bringing in 50,000 francs for the town. They disappeared in 1943 due to traffic congestion. One was located on the Route de Neuilly, mixed with Puteaux; one at the Bergères traffic circle; one at the former Quai Impérial (mixed with Saint-Cloud); and finally, the central octroi office in Suresnes. After World War I, one of them moved to the corner of the Blériot factories.

In the early 19th century, mail was deposited in a box on Rue Saint-Antoine. The Paris-Suresnes stagecoach then took it to the Neuilly post office for delivery the following day. The telegraph was first installed in an annex of the town hall on Rue Fizeau, which moved in 1885 to the corner of Rue de Rueil (now Rue Desbassyns-de-Richemont) and Rue Charon (later Rue Fizeau). Later, a post office was opened at the corner of Rue du Clos-des-Ermites and Rue Carnot. In 1935, the Cité-Jardin was equipped with a post office. In 1957, the Lower Suresnes Post Office was inaugurated.

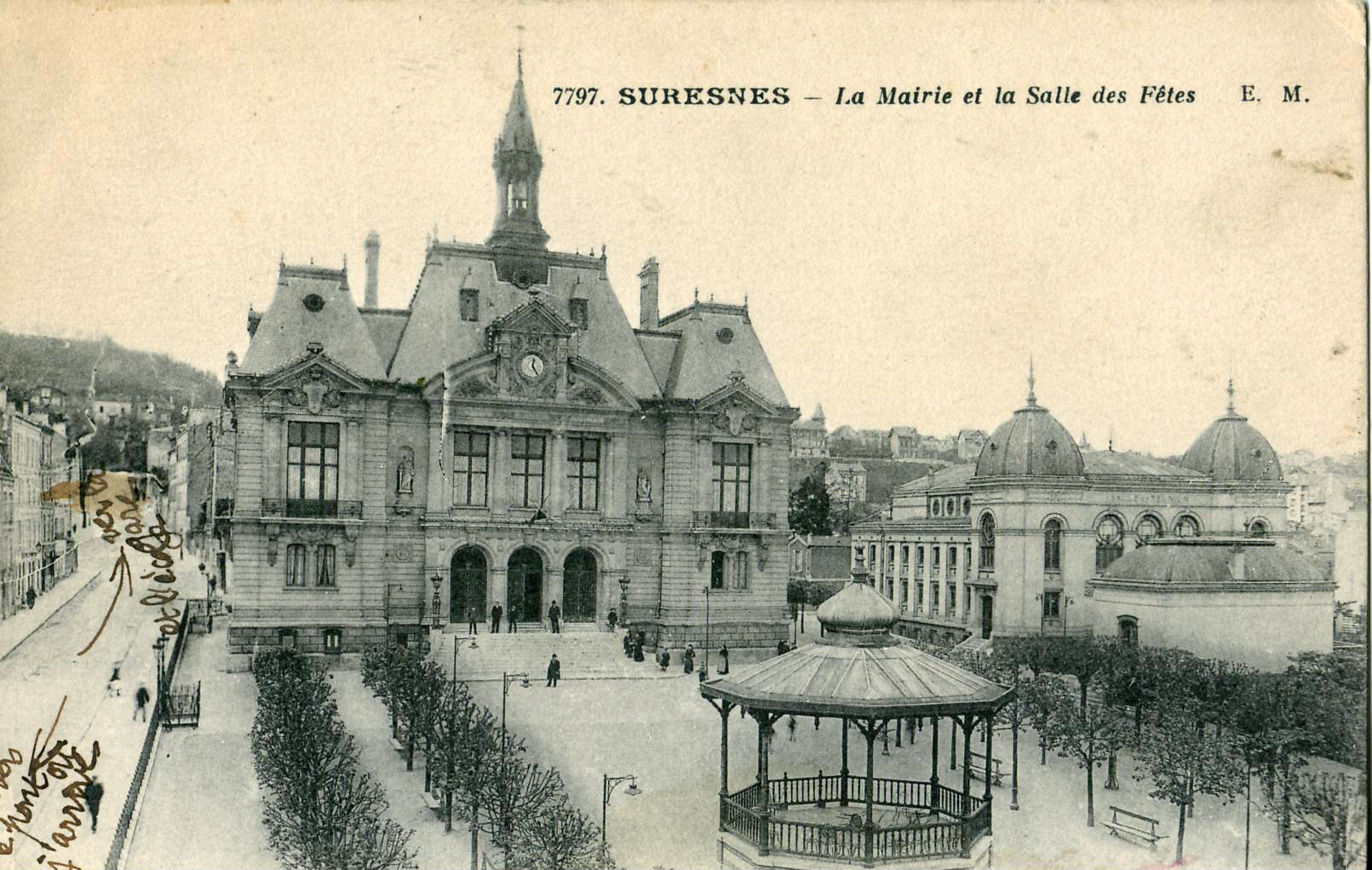
The new town hall (centre) and the village hall (right). The kiosk in the garden has since been replaced by a monument in homage to Henri Sellier.

A plot of land was acquired in 1886-1887 to house the new town hall. Charles Garnier presided over the architectural competition. Jean Bréasson (Note: Specializing in town halls, he also designed those of Versailles, Neuilly-sur-Seine and Pantin.) was commissioned to carry out the work, at a cost of around 465,000 francs. The façade is neoclassical in style, adorned with statues of Law and Justice; the building also features a monumental double-revolution staircase and high attic space. The town hall is decorated with marouflaged canvases by Henri Brémont (1911), who also created the stained-glass windows for the new Suresnes church; he depicts the link between Suresnes and the Seine, in particular the dam and lock. The foundation stone was laid on March 15, 1887; the clergy was not invited to the ceremony, a sign of the anti-clerical atmosphere at the time. The building was inaugurated on December 1, 1889, with a distribution of aid to people in need, a fair, a balloon ride, a banquet, and a public ball. The Prefect of the Seine, Eugène Poubelle, was present. The first municipal council meeting was held on December 5. In the meantime, Guillaumet had resigned, leaving Caron in charge. In May 1890, schoolteacher Edgard Fournier published the first history of Suresnes.

In 1878, the inhabitants and industrialists of Suresnes and Puteaux called for the construction of a goods station. On December 31, a law authorized the construction of the Moulineaux line. Still, work did not begin until July 28, 1886, giving rise to expropriations and the construction of viaducts (the first with a 4-metre opening on the Sente de Chigneux in Puteaux, a second in masonry with three arches and a 10-metre opening on the Chemin des Bas-Rogers and a third with an 8-metre opening on the Chemin de la Tuilerie, now Rue Jean-Jacques-Rousseau). A tunnel (310 m long under the “Paris-Versailles” station and Rue Desbassyns) is also dug. The Suresnes-Longchamp station was built between 1886 and 1889, with a high retaining wall along the Boulevard de Versailles to stabilize the earth fill, and two staircases leading to the Place de la Gare. While the new line did not change residents' habits, the creation of a goods station between the Rue des Bas-Rogers and the Rue des Velettes fulfilled their long-standing wishes. The line was inaugurated at the 1889 Paris Universal Exhibition and electrified in 1928. In 1907, the company built the pedestrian footbridge over the freight station. Recognized as dangerous, the Puteaux connection was withdrawn in October 1934.

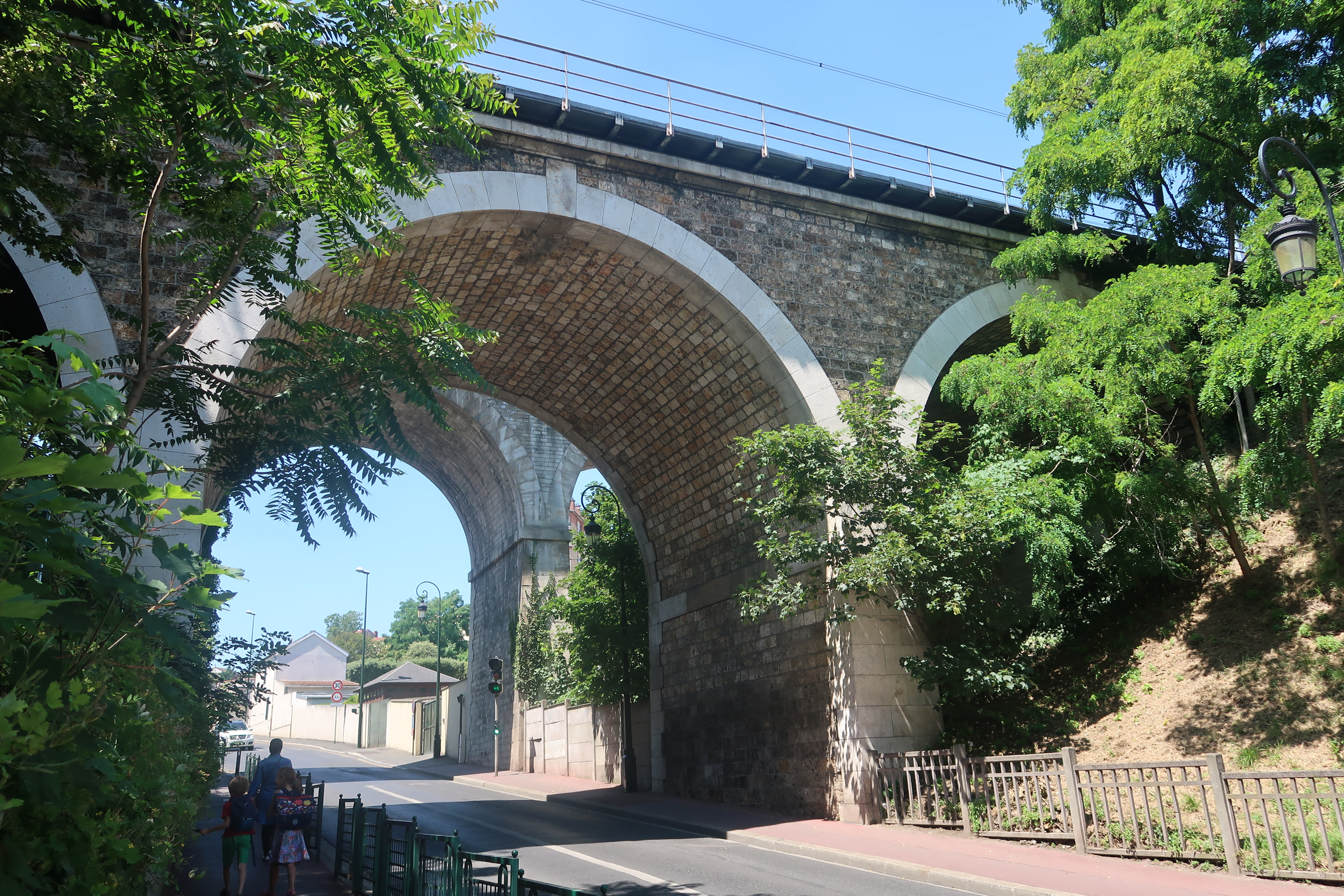
Bas-Rogers Viaduct or "Five Arches Bridge", over which the Moulineaux line passes.

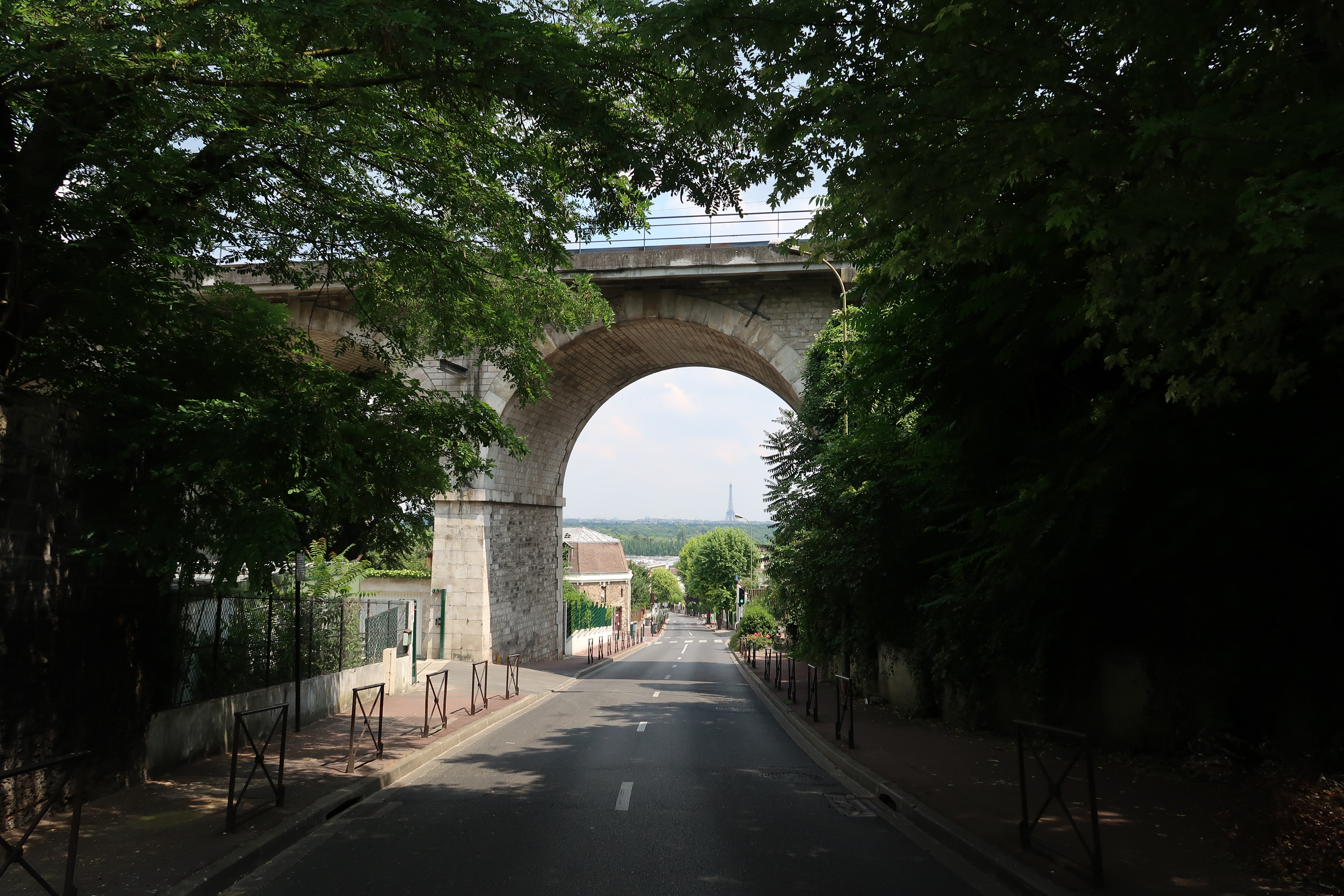
Val d'Or Viaduct, which serves the same line.

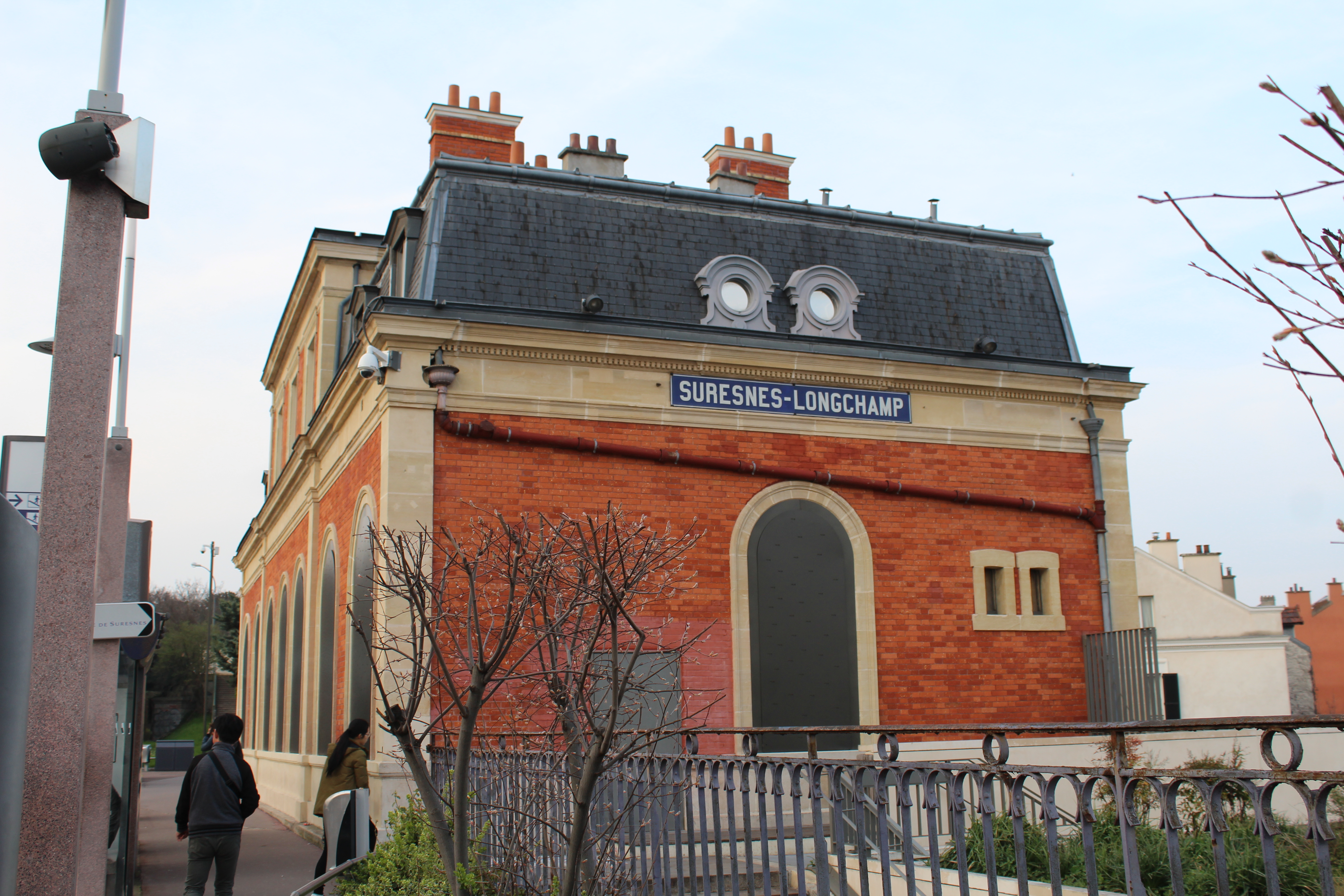
Former Suresnes-Longchamp station building, current headquarters of the Musée d'histoire urbaine et sociale de Suresnes.

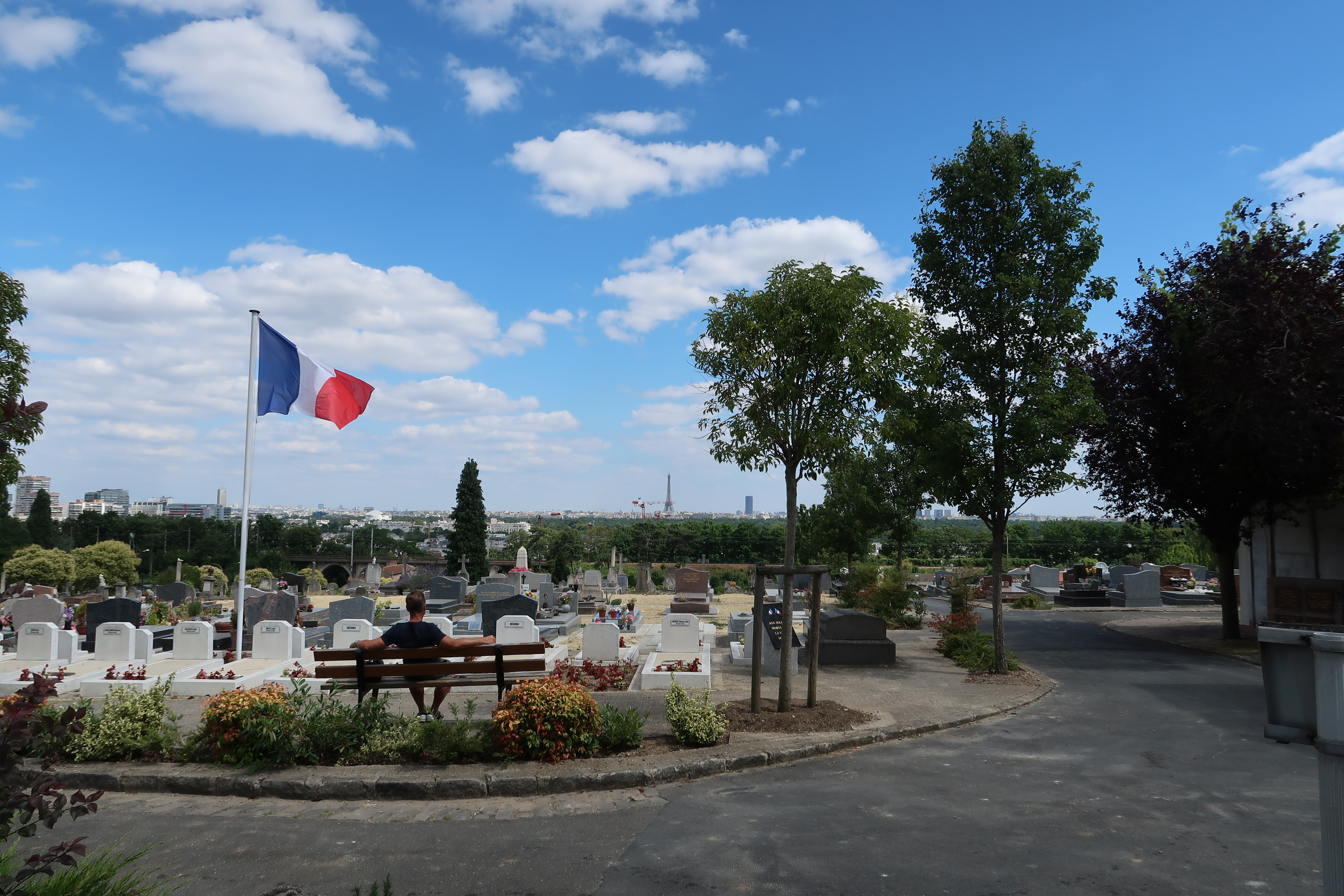
The Voltaire cemetery, the second cemetery in Suresnes after the Carnot cemetery.

==== The 1890s ====
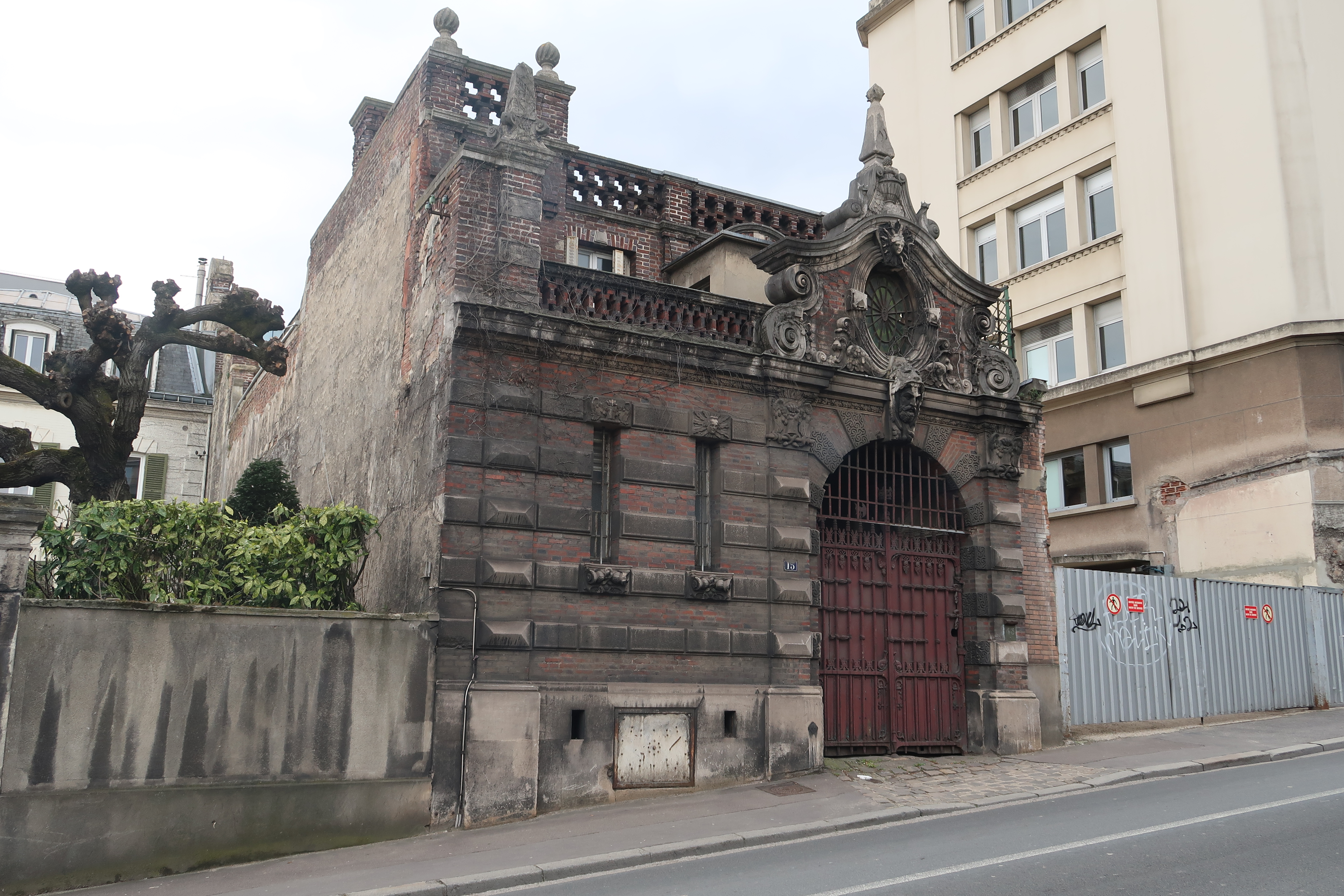
Monumental door from 1864, (Note: Jean Prasteau presents it as the old door to the castle stables.) the last vestige of the initial property of the couturier Worth. It has two snails on its pediment, symbolizing the couturier's rise.

Rapid population growth led the town council to consider creating a new cemetery in the Bas-Roger district. The decision was passed by the town council in 1890, with architect Girard in charge of the work, and the cemetery was subsequently named the Voltaire Cemetery. Several prominent figures are buried here, including engineers Fernand Forest and Prosper Émile Liot, painter Juana Romani, and actors Marcel Herrand and Félix Oudart. On May 11, 1889, a petition from Suresnois called for the installation of a telephone service between the suburbs and Paris. The replacement of gas with electricity to light the town was also envisaged. In 1891, the first mention was made of a racecourse on the Plaine de la Fouilleuse, a piece of land that once belonged to the Dames de Longchamp (to whom the Cour des Dames in the historic center pays tribute). The project to create a racecourse is authorized and developed by wealthy breeder Edmond Blanc and takes the name of Saint-Cloud racecourse, located in the neighboring commune on the edge of Suresnes, like Longchamp. Caron was re-elected mayor in May 1892, and on September 17, a central telephone office was installed.

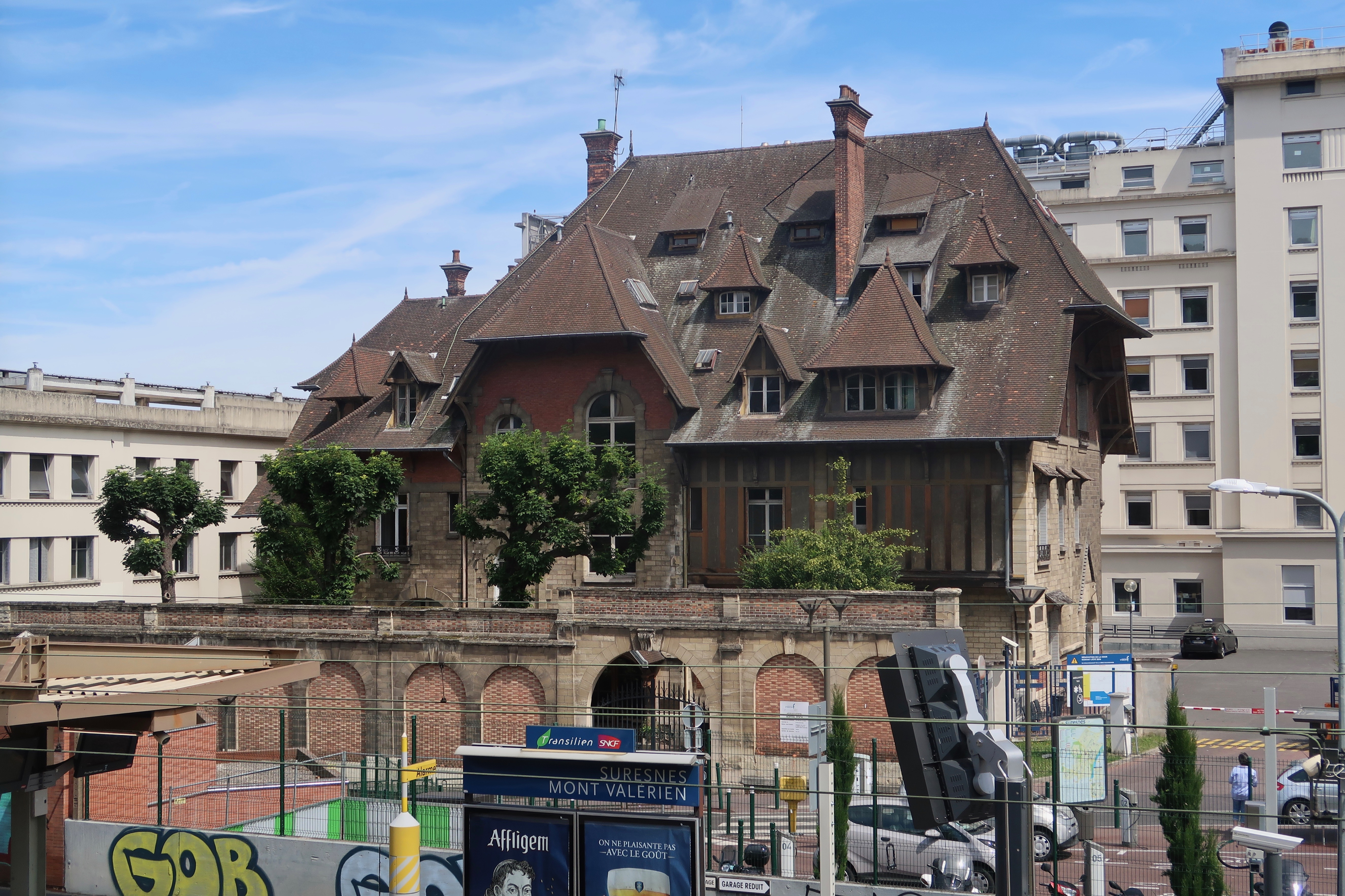
The Balsan pavilion, built by the couturier's son, became a building of the Foch hospital.

With a population of 9,000, the number of winegrowers continued to decline. The petty bourgeoisie occupied a few houses near the railway line, and industry continued to develop, requiring an ever-increasing workforce. A secular freethought society is formed, calling for the removal of religious books from the girls' school and the renaming of streets dedicated to saints. The nursery school housed in the former presbytery proved too small, and it was decided to build a new school complex between Rue Carnot and Rue de Neuilly. Plans by architects Godefroy and Beaulieu were submitted in 1894, as were those for the village hall on the opposite side of the sidewalk: the latter, designed by Édouard Bauhain and Raymond Barbaud, featured a framework by the Eiffel company. In 1895, fashion designer Charles Frederick Worth died; the street adjacent to his property was renamed in his honor. In the garden of the historicist-style château he had built by architect Denis Darcy on the site of the former Clos-des-Seigneurs in the 1860s, he had stored a large number of columns, sculptures, and statues salvaged from the ruins of the Tuileries Palace (burnt down during the Commune), which he had frequented as a result of working for Empress Eugénie. Exotic greenhouses also adorn the park. The interior is richly decorated. In 1892, his son Gaston erected a neo-Norman-style building on the site, known as the Balsan Pavilion (named after the billionaire Consuelo Vanderbilt, wife of Balsan). Charles Frederick Worth's original property was razed to the ground in the early 1930s to be replaced by the Hôpital Foch; all that remained was the monumental gateway on Avenue Franklin-Roosevelt, while the remains of the Tuileries were transferred to Barentin (Seine-Maritime). The Pavillon Balsan, bequeathed to the Foch Foundation, has been preserved.

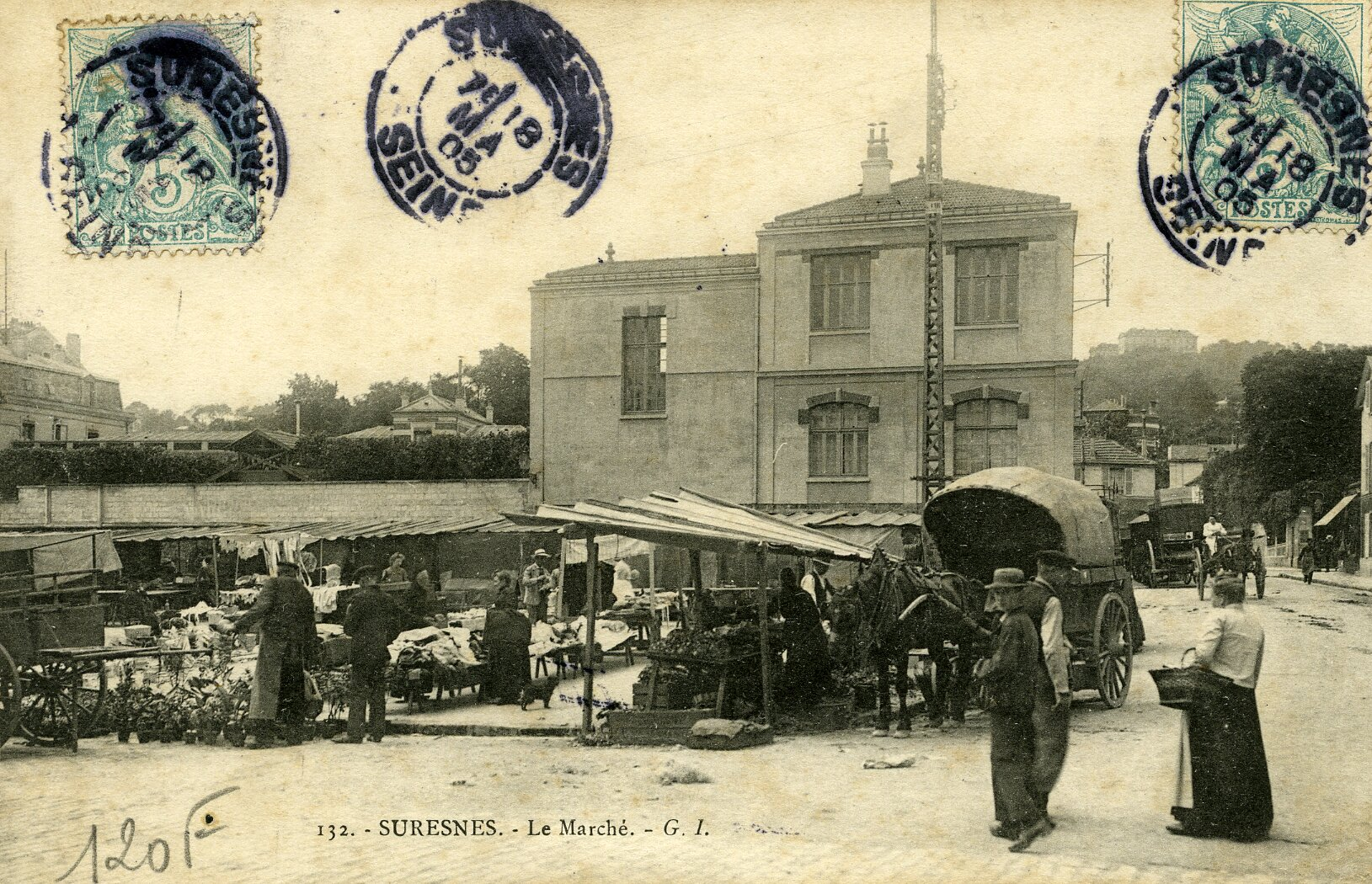
The market in 1905, with the Jules-Ferry school in the background and Mont Valérien at the top right.

In the municipal elections of May 1896, Arthème Genteur was elected mayor; he was more left-wing than his predecessor. Plans for a new school and village hall were maintained. The extension of the market led to the demolition of old houses on Rue du Moutier, but it was decided that the market would be a “flying” one, not a permanent one. A fountain purchased from the town of Asnières was installed on the square; after the First World War, it was moved to the garden city at the junction of Rue de Garches (Note: Current Rue Raymond-Cosson.) and Rue de Montretout. The village hall and the Place du Marché (Note: Current Place du 8-Mai-1945.) were inaugurated on September 26–27. A bandstand was also built in the town hall square (where the statue of Henri Sellier now stands), along with a charity office, now the Justice of the Peace office, on the side of the square.

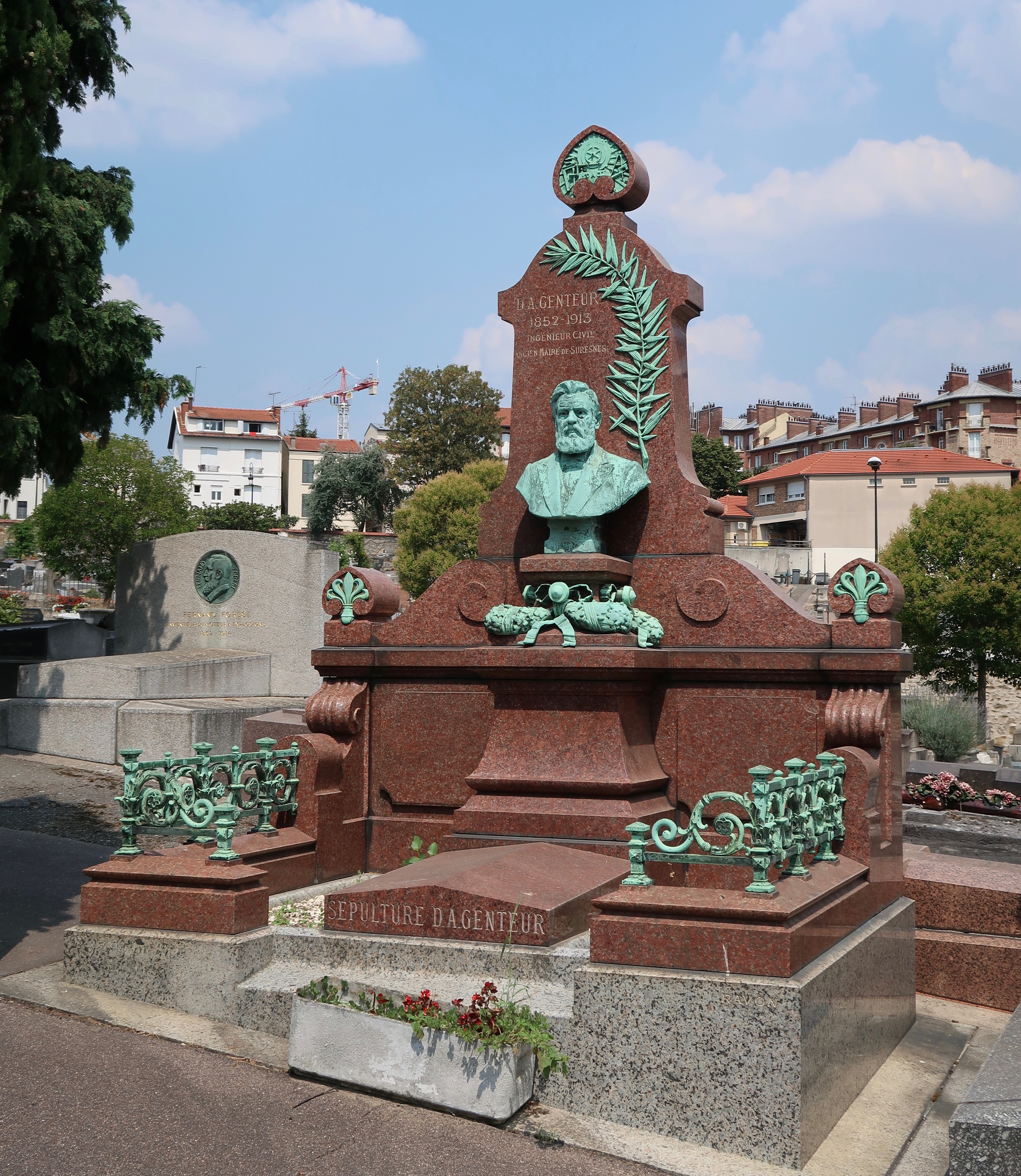
Tomb of Mayor Arthème Genteur in the Voltaire cemetery (bust of Auguste Maillard).

Following the merger of the Compagnie du Gaz de Suresnes and the Société des usines du Nord et de l'est, the company was awarded the concession to supply electricity in March 1898. On October 3, Rue Saint-Antoine was renamed Rue Ledru-Rollin, Rue Sainte-Apolline Rue de la Mairie, and Rue Saint-Jean Rue Merlin-de-Thionville. The municipal commission in charge of the project noted, however, that priority had to be given to perpetuating the memory of the inhabitants of Suresnes and "to that of citizens of the Third Republic who had distinguished themselves in the defense of public liberties", with emphasis also placed on preserving many localities, although some disappeared. Other roads were renamed, such as Rue Chardon, which became Rue Fizeau, and Rue des Trébourgeois, which became Rue Voltaire.

A new school was also planned, on the corner of Rue Carnot and the former Rue du Cèdre, (Note: Current Rue Jean-Macé.) but was not inaugurated until 1908. An older people's home was also created in 1899, in the building occupied by the headmistress of the nursery school. In July of the same year, a monument to those who died for their country was inaugurated in the new Bas-Rogers cemetery (now the Voltaire cemetery).

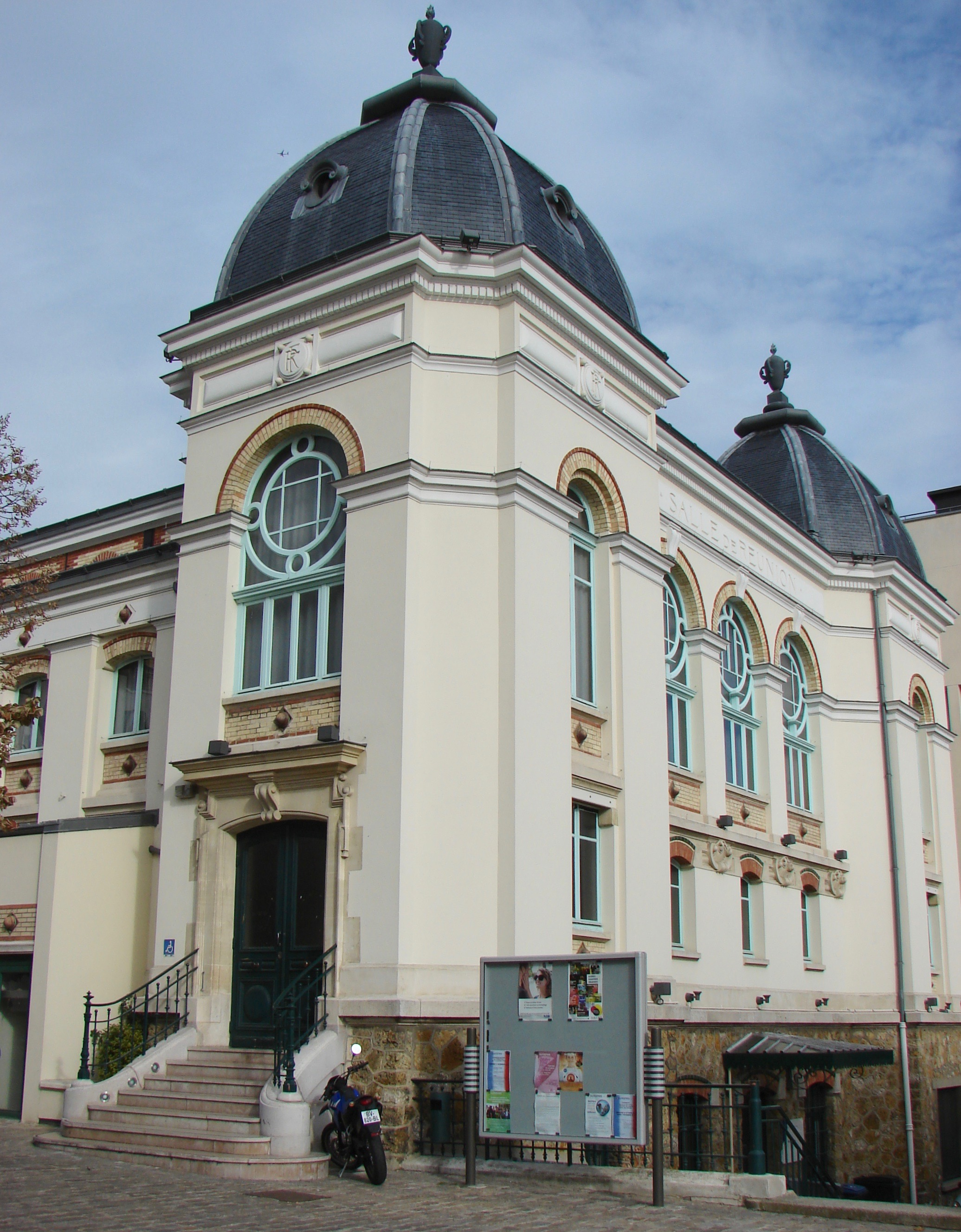
The village hall, located along the town hall.

In 1897, an agreement was reached to create the Compagnie du Chemin de Fer du Bois de Boulogne, from Porte Maillot to Suresnes, near the Gare de Longchamp. In reality, this was an electric trolley railway. In 1911, the line was extended to Saint-Cloud; the following year, to Garches; and, during the First World War, to the Rueil arsenal. Although it carried no more than 8,000 to 10,000 passengers a day, it did handle 25,000 to 30,000 on weekends and public holidays and 50,000 at certain events at the Longchamp racecourse. The end of the concession, bought by RATP Group in 1930, technical problems, and poor service to the new garden city led to its demise in 1936. The following year, the railroad was replaced by the “44” bus line and the “44 B,” which departed from Saint-Cloud but no longer crossed the Bois de Boulogne; in Suresnes, it ran via Boulevard de Versailles and Rue Émile-Zola.

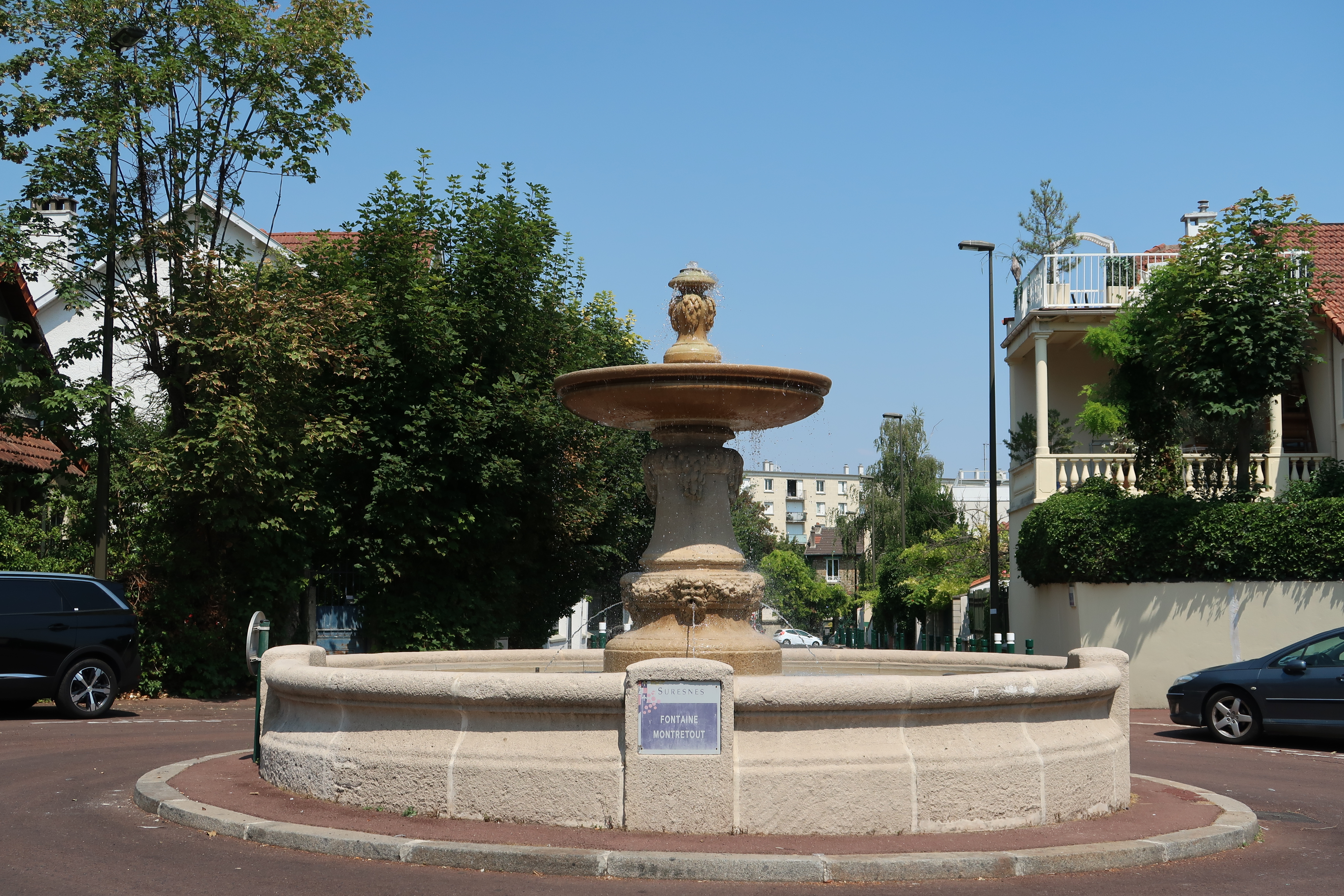
Fountain at the intersection of Rue Raymond-Cosson and Rue de Montretout, previously located on the market square.

A gendarmerie brigade was set up in Suresnes, in a building constructed in 1898 on Rue de Verdun, not far from the present-day church. The aim was to relieve congestion in the Puteaux brigade, which was too busy working in the Bois de Boulogne.

On August 30, 1898, during the Dreyfus affair, Lieutenant-Colonel Hubert Henry was taken into police custody at the Mont Valérien fort following the opening of an investigation by the Minister of War, Mr. Cavaignac. The next day, Henry cut his wrists with a razor in his cell on the second floor of the "1812 building".

Laure Surville, the sister of writer Honoré de Balzac, retired to Suresnes at the end of her life. She was married to M. Alain, a civil engineer from the Ponts-et-Chaussée department, who had participated in the design of the 1842 suspension bridge.

=== Development of the industry ===
==== End of dyeing ====
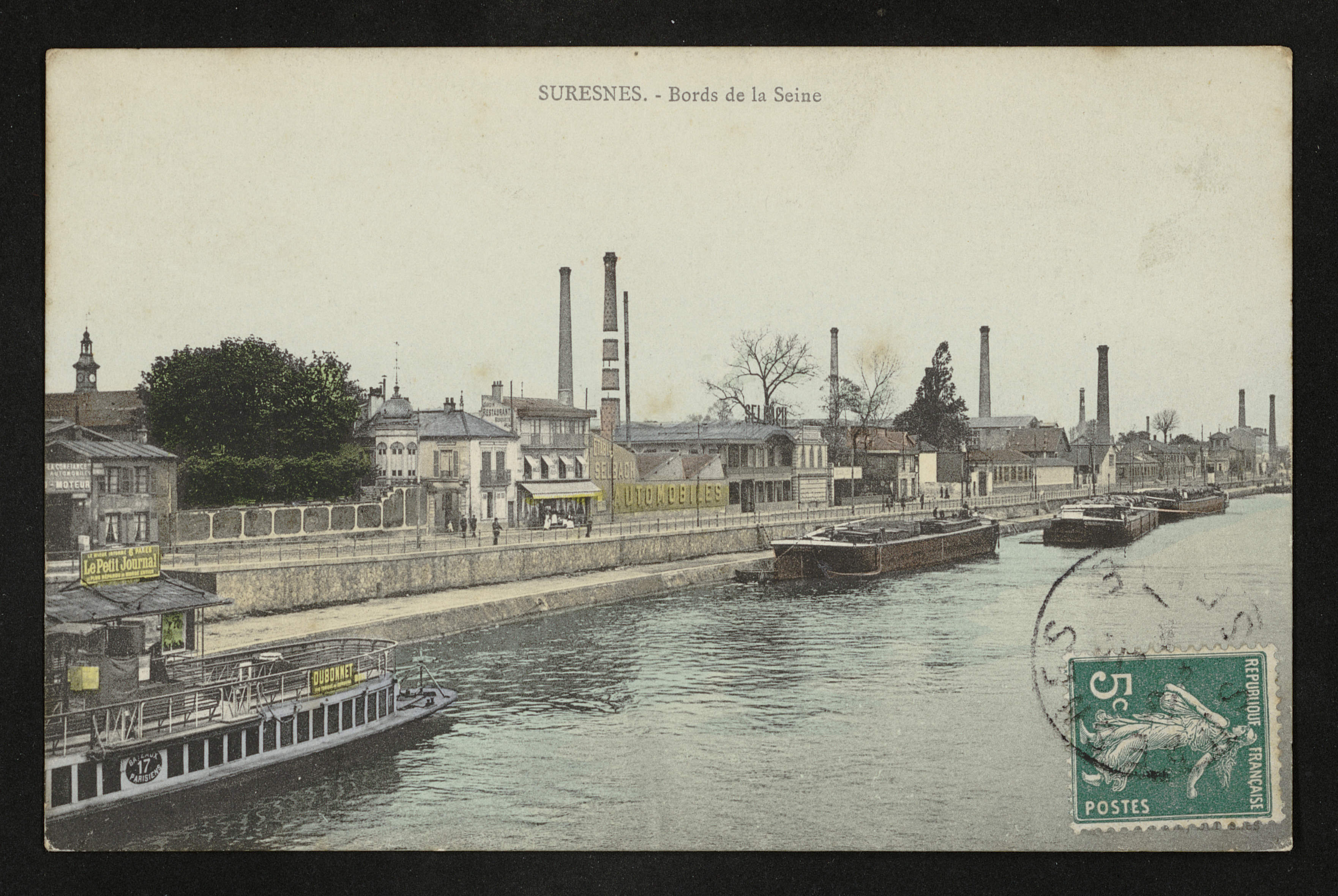
Factories and their chimneys on the banks of the Seine.

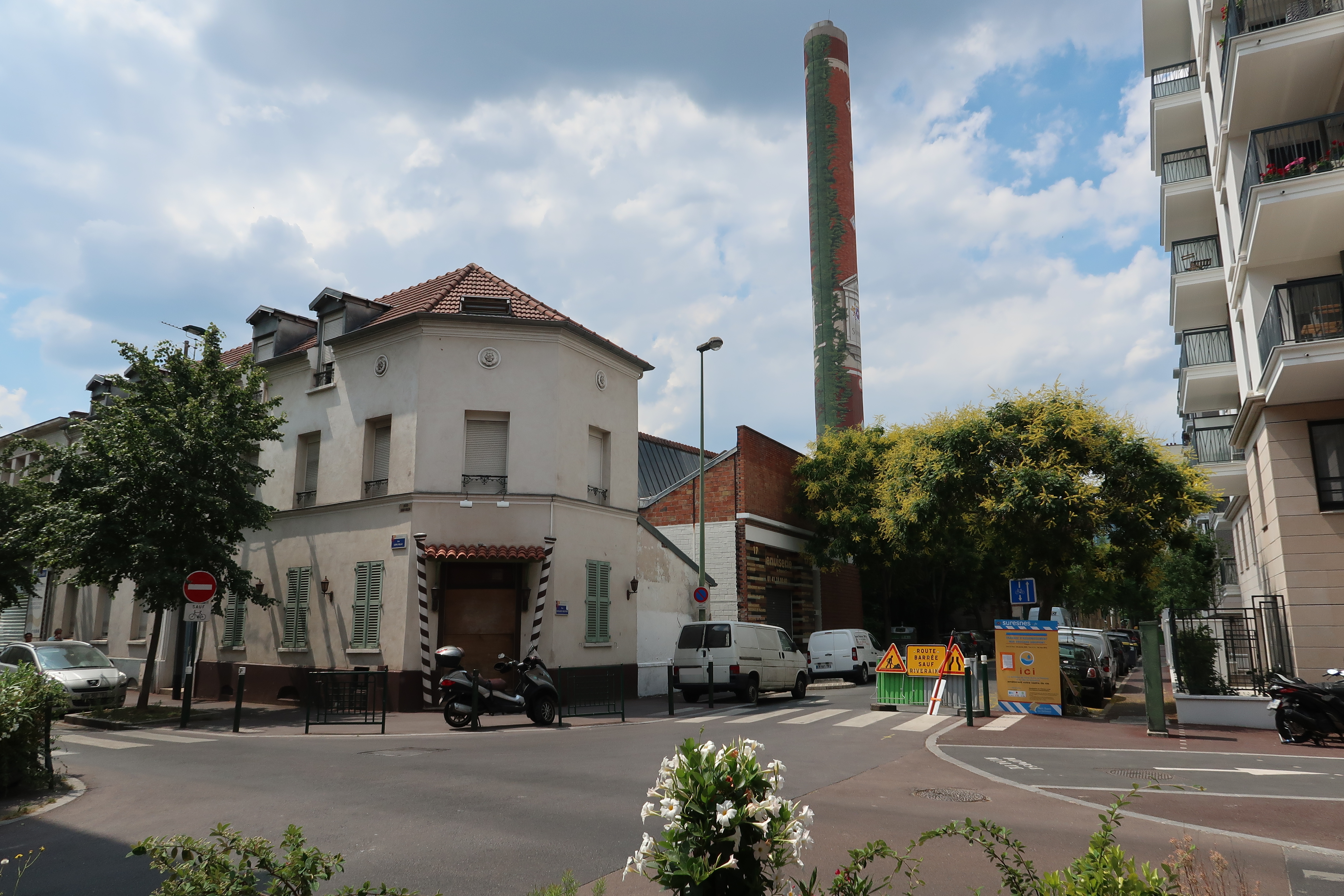
Old factory chimney, Rue Édouard-Nieuport. (Note: Standing 53 meters tall, it only dates from 1975, and was initially used to evacuate fumes from the city's district heating plant. It is a nod to the industrial history of Suresnes, which had many factory chimneys near the Seine at the turn of the century. This is the last one. In 2012, the coat of arms of Suresnes was painted there by the American artist Robert Dafford, who has also created other frescoes in the city.)

Gradually, the old industries gave way to automobile and then aviation factories. The dyeing plant, founded in 1833, was replaced by an automobile factory in the former Rothschild Park. Created by Rouques, it was sold to Terrier around 1850, who joined forces two years later with Jean Bernadotte (second cousin of Swedish King Charles XV), who eventually took over the business. Wishing to invite his cousin to visit his factory during the 1867 Universal Exhibition, he proposed building a fountain at the corner of Rue du Bac and Rue des Bourets on condition that the former be renamed “Rue du roi de Suède.” In the end, the King did not come, but the street kept this name until 1881. In 1877, future Normandy MP Georges Roulleaux-Dugage joined forces with André Meunier-Pouthot. In 1893, after the owners' deaths, part of the land was subdivided for housing, and three streets were laid out (Colonel-Picard, Frédéric-Passy, and Diderot; the first two were renamed by Henri Sellier in 1920 as Belle-Gabrielle and Conférences-de-Suresnes, in tribute to the commune's history). The dyeing business disappeared at the beginning of the following century. There were other dye works, however, such as that run by Arthur Guillaumet, mayor of Suresnes between 1878 and 1888, between Rue du Port-au-Vin and Pagès. In the former château grounds, a dye factory was first established (along Rue de Penthièvre (Note: Future Rue Keygley then Avenue Georges-Pompidou.) and Rue de Gondolo), purchased from Betty de Rothschild at the end of 1870 and later taken over by Edmond Sordes and his cousin Alphonse Huillard, also mayor of Suresnes, then by the Compagnie des extraits tinctoriaux du Havre and finally by the Société lilloise des laminoirs in 1914. The neighborhood was also home to a carpet factory before the automobile industry arrived, thwarting plans to turn this once aristocratic neighborhood into a residential area.

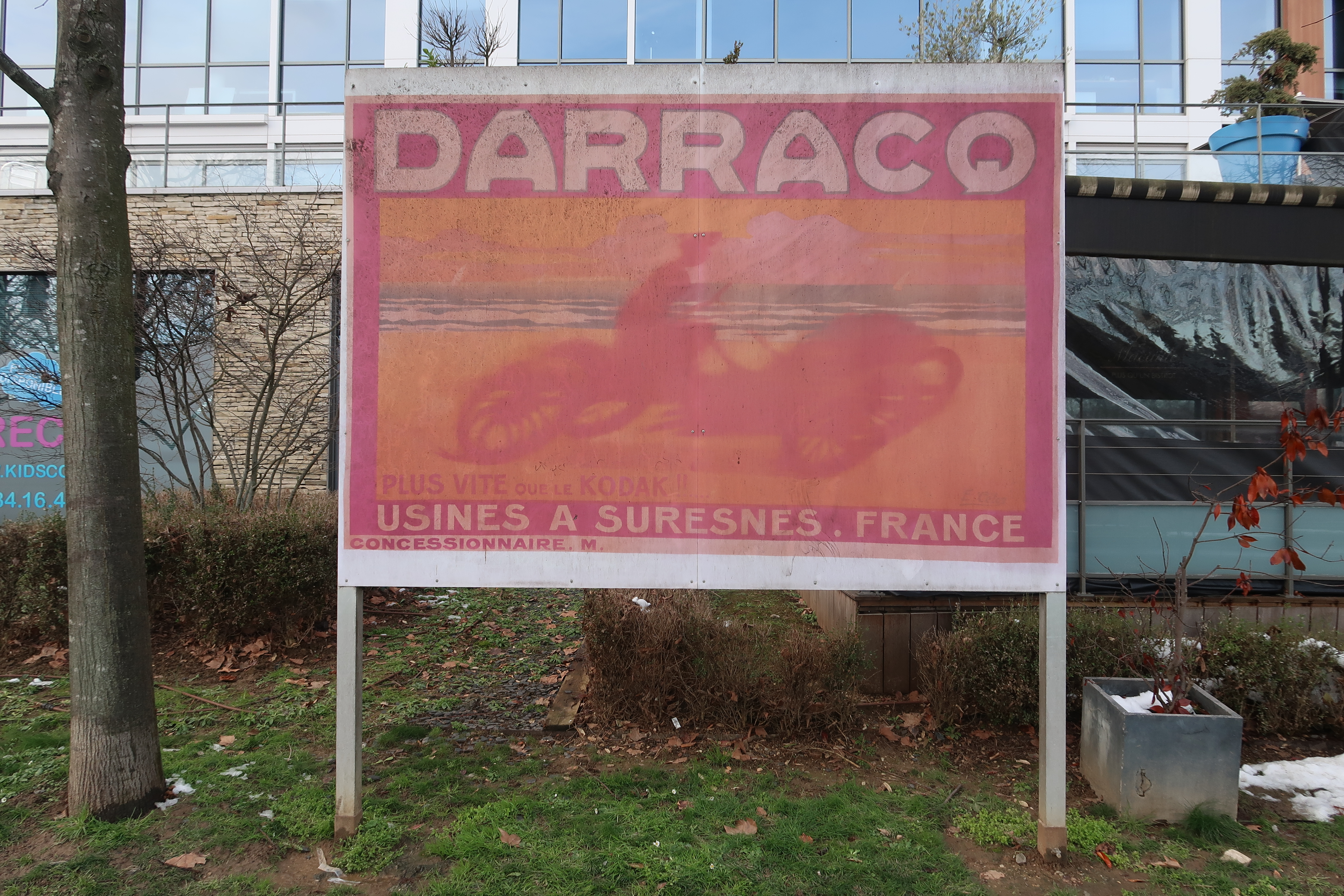
Commemorative panel with an old advertisement for the Darracq automobile brand, along the Quai Gallieni, where the Suresnes factories were mainly located.

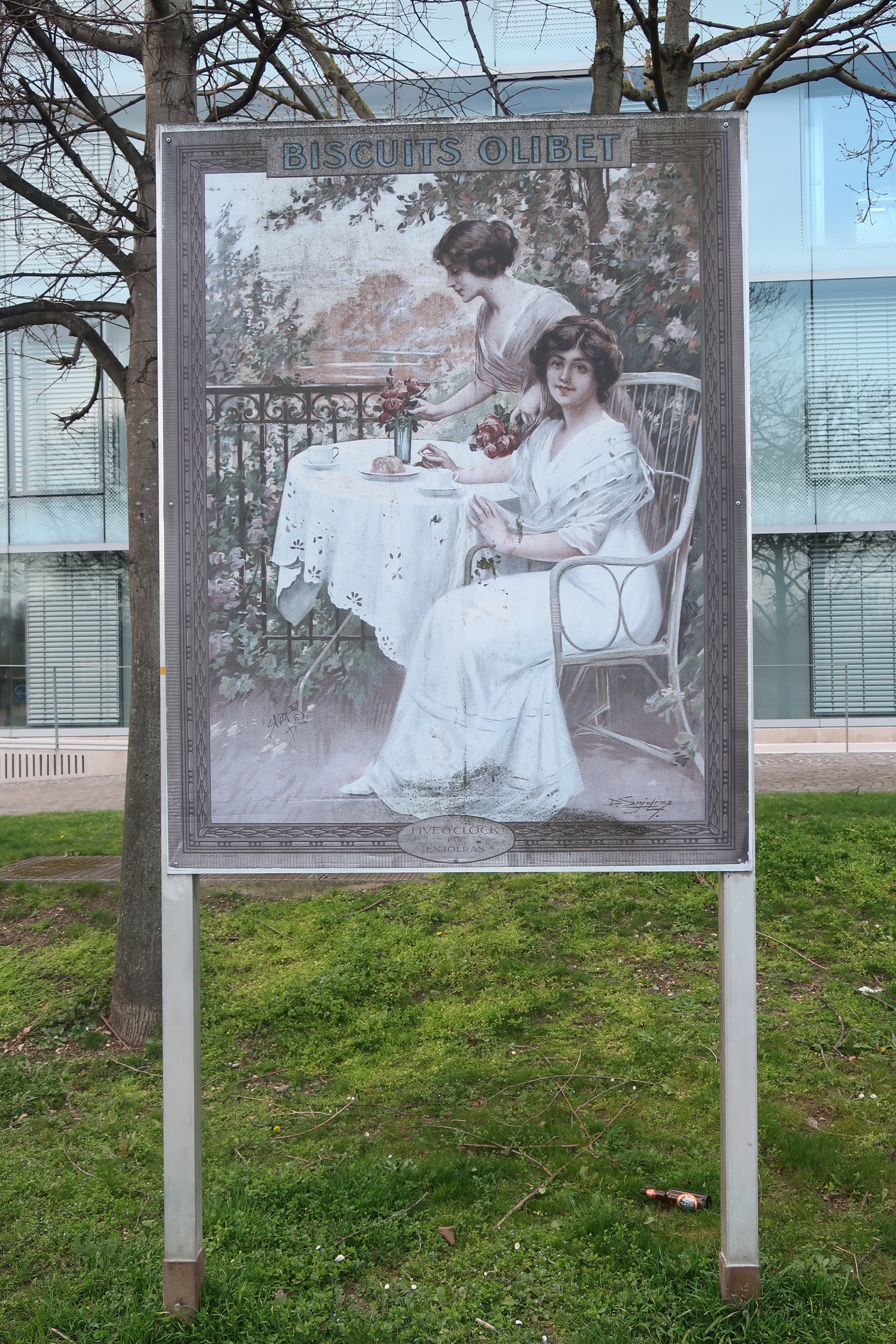
Commemorative panel with an old advertisement for the Olibet biscuit brand, on the same quay.

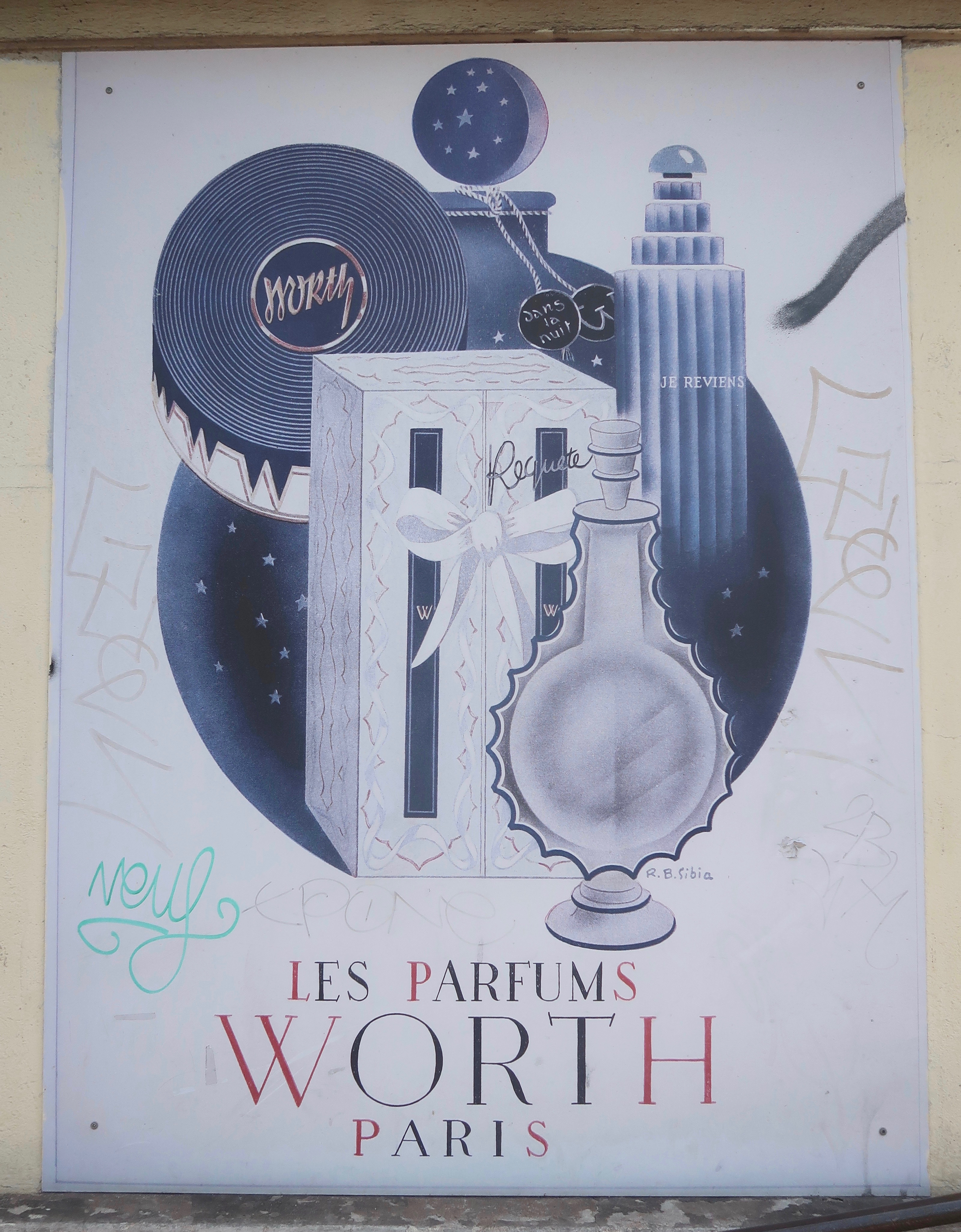
Memorial panel with an old advertisement for the perfume brand Worth, on the site of the former property of the couturier's family.

==== Automobiles ====
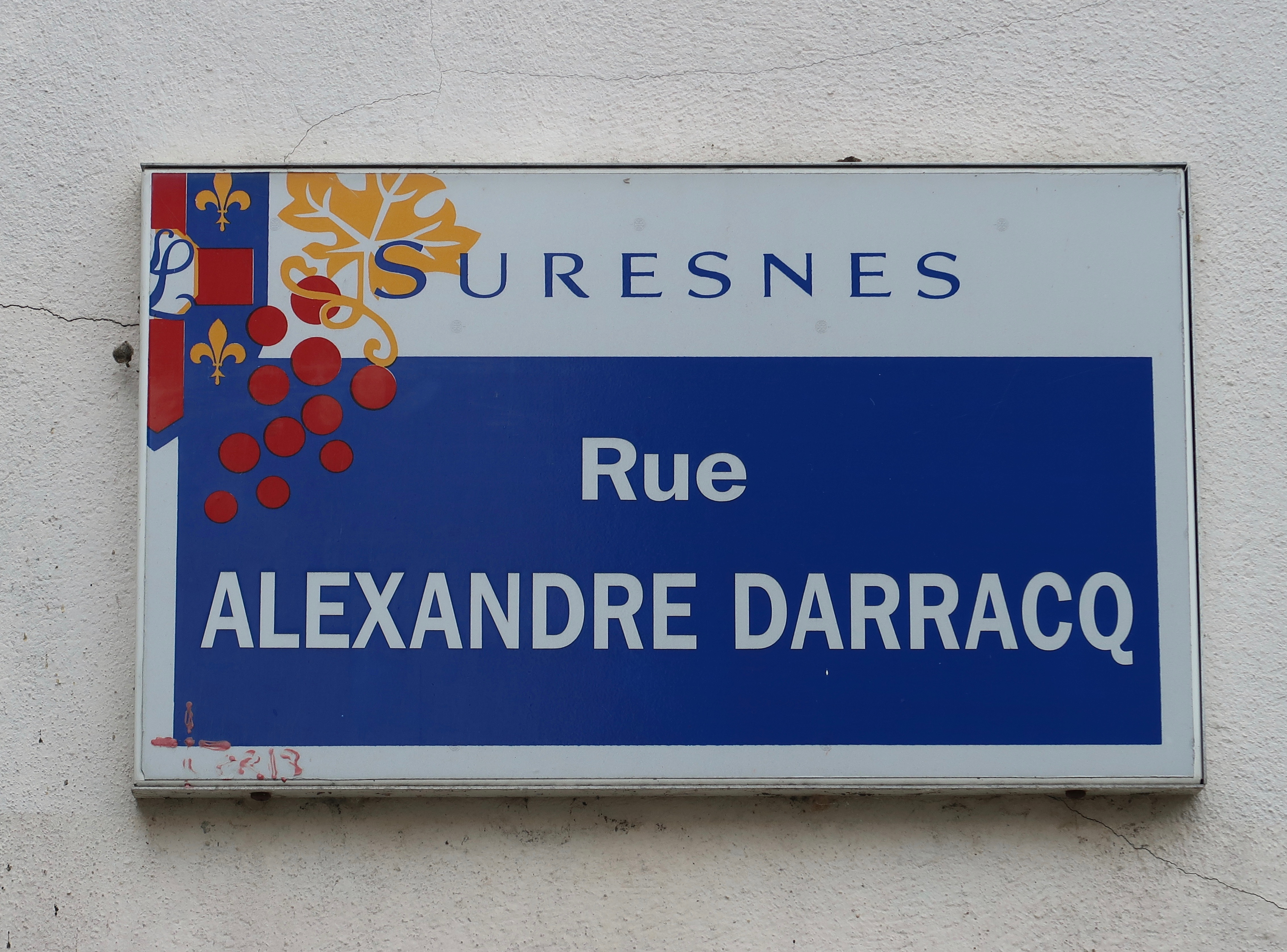
Plaque on Rue Alexandre-Darracq, in homage to the industrialist who set up his bicycle and automobile factories in Suresnes.

The development of industry in Suresnes paralleled that of surrounding towns, such as Renault in 1899 and Voisin in 1905 in Boulogne-Billancourt, De Dion-Bouton in Puteaux, and the towns of Asnières-sur-Seine, Neuilly-sur-Seine, Levallois-Perret, and Gennevilliers, considered to be the cradles of the automobile: 115 manufacturers were born in the Hauts-de-Seine during the Belle Époque. Under the pressure of industry, vineyards, cherry orchards, and fields gradually disappeared.

In 1896, Suresnes' first metallurgical plant, Gallia, moved into the Parc Rothschild, creating the city's first workers' mutual insurance company. Two years earlier, Alexandre Darracq began building Gladiator bicycles in his 3-hectare factory at 33 Quai Gallieni, employing a thousand people. He received a medal and diploma from the municipality, thanking the mayor for his determination, "in his small way, to make Suresnes a prosperous manufacturing town, a little French Coventry". In 1905, he founded the Darracq et Cie company, which was later acquired by Talbot (Sunbeam-Tablot-Darracq or STD group, then the Rootes group from 1934). Louis Chevrolet worked alongside him as a foreman before leaving for the United States in 1900. After the Second World War, the rue Salomon-de-Rothschild factory was used only as a warehouse. In 1902, Latil moved to the banks of the Seine, near Rue des Meuniers, to build heavy trucks. In 1909, Le Zèbre moved to Suresnes, where its owner, Jules Salomon, was associated with Jacques Bizet (son of Georges Bizet). In 1910, Saurer moved to Suresnes, manufacturing trucks and buses in a plant at 67 Rue de Neuilly and 4 Rue Benoît-Malon, later taken over by Unic and still in operation after the Second World War.[h53] Citroën also had a factory there.

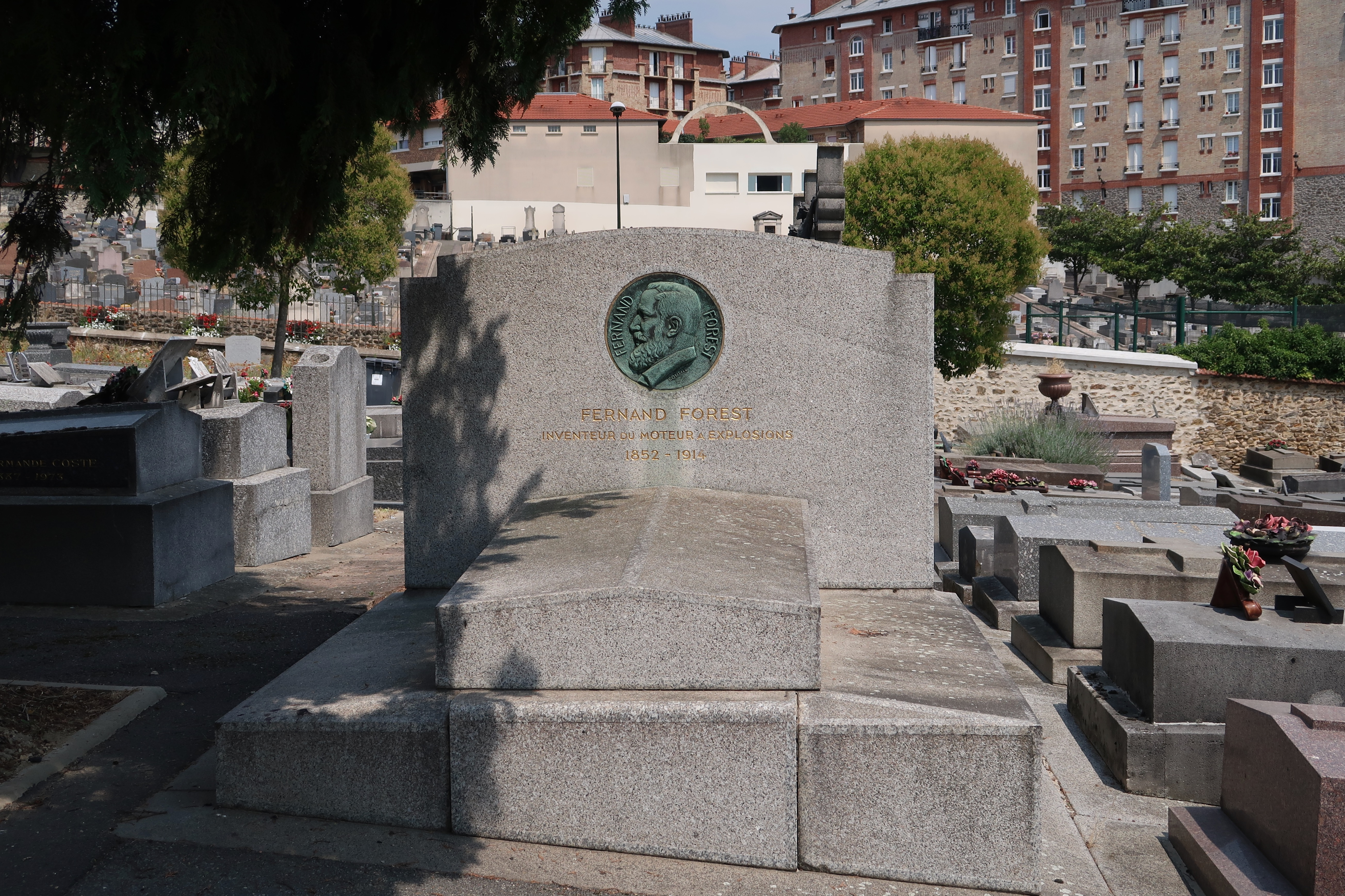
Tomb of engineer Fernand Forest in the Voltaire cemetery, erected at municipal expense.

The establishment of these industries attracted retailers specializing in bicycles and automobiles to the district (already very busy with balls and guinguettes), right up to the bridge, particularly for gasoline, at the bottom of Boulevard de Versailles, near the cafés. To avoid paying the octroi tax, many Parisians came to the Pont de Suresnes at weekends to stock up on petrol in cans. In 1921, the first petrol-dispensing columns were installed at 7 and 62 Boulevard de Versailles. The speed of cars traveling over the bridge to Suresnes (30–40 km/h) was considered excessive for the time, and an agent was installed to prevent accidents. In May 1891, Merelle, de Dion, and Bouton competed in an automobile race between the Bourget fire pump and the Château de Versailles. On their return to Suresnes, near the Moulineaux railroad bridge that spans the boulevard, de Dion's car collided violently with Merelle's, perhaps the first automobile accident in history, according to René Sordes. In 1907, engineer Fernand Forest set up shop at No. 22 Boulevard, transforming his home into a workshop for research, notably into canoe and automobile engines. Copied by his competitors, his property was finally seized in 1909. Appreciated by the people of Suresnes, he was awarded the Légion d'Honneur before he died in 1914. The municipality offered him a perpetual plot in the Voltaire cemetery and paid an annuity to his widow. The rue des Petits-Clos, where he lived, was renamed in his honor.

==== Aviation ====
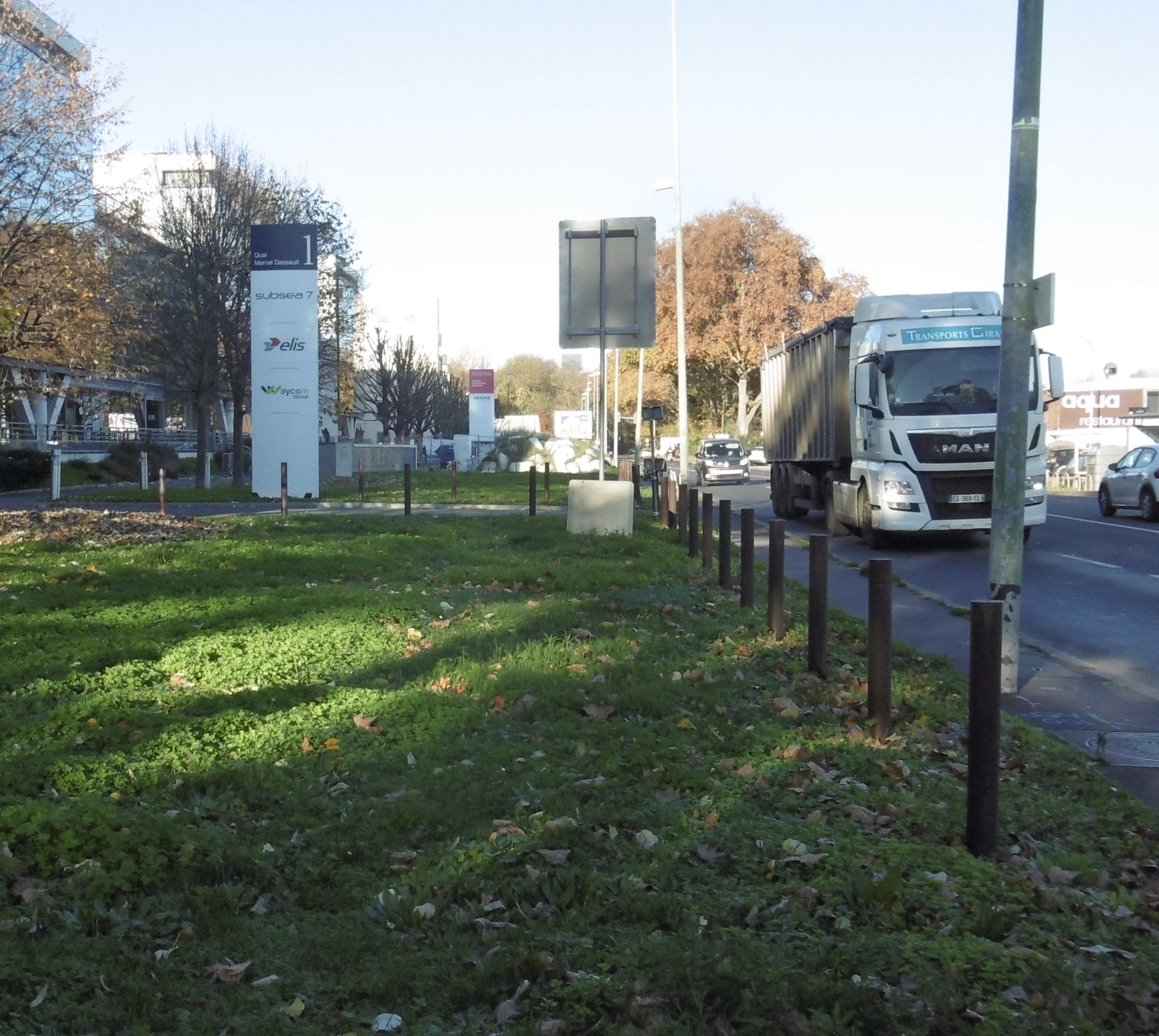
The mosaics of the former Blériot Aéronautique factory in Suresnes are exhibited in their original location (since 1917), even though the original building was destroyed in 2004. The current building is partly occupied by the Airbus group and then, since 2020, by the SKEMA Business School.

In 1903, Léon Levavasseur set up a workshop in his garden at 14 Rue du Ratrait, where he built an airplane that was later tested at Villotran but eventually destroyed. He then concentrated on building the “Antoinette” engine, which powered the plane flown by Alberto Santos-Dumont on November 12, 1906, in the Parc de Bagatelle, where Santos-Dumont set a world record. The engine was then adopted by Louis Blériot, Farman (based at Place Eugène-Sue, on the site of the writer's former property), and Léon Delagrange. Captain Ferdinand Ferber, who lived in Suresnes for a long time, studied Levavasseur's engines in particular; a street on the northern plateau is dedicated to him. At the same time, the Nieuport brothers were manufacturing spark plugs on Rue de Seine. (Note: Current Rue Édouard-Nieuport.) With the development of aviation, they began building aircraft. They died shortly before the First World War. In 1915, Louis Blériot set up his factory in Suresnes, at the junction of Quai and Rue du Val-d'Or, in place of the disused gasworks. (Note: This aircraft factory has an enamel sign in the Art Nouveau style, the last vestige to remain today, the rest of the building having been destroyed in 2004. A commemorative plaque has also been installed.) A total of 28,000 m² of workshops were built on a 40,000 m² site in response to the development of military aviation amid the First World War (via SPAD, acquired in 1914). According to René Sordes, "Suresnes can be proud of the efforts made at the beginning of the century by some of the great pioneers, creators of these gigantic industries, the automobile, and aviation".

==== Electronics ====
In 1911, Westinghouse Cie Hewitt set up its workshops in the former seigniorial house of Suresnes, Rue du Pont. In 1921, Radiotechnique built a factory at 51 Rue Carnot, producing radio lamps and later TSF sets. At 106 Rue Carnot, the Société de Mécanique de Construction Tubulaire is located.

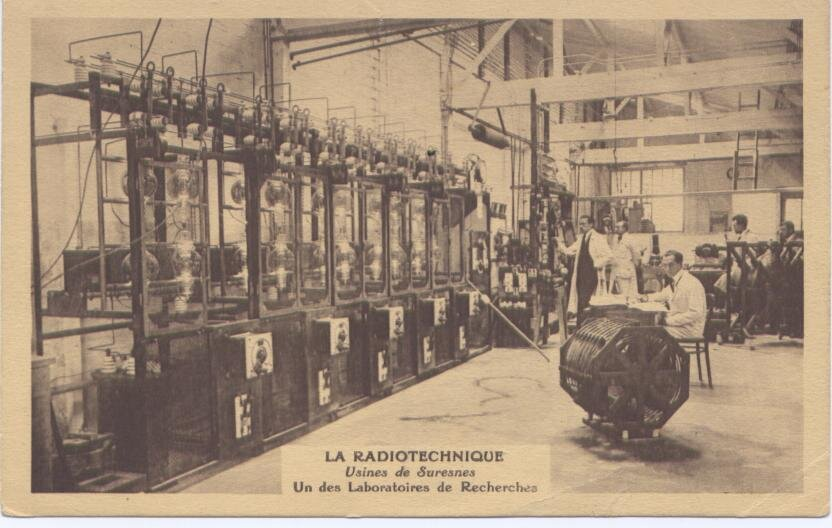
Radiotechnics factory in Suresnes in 1937.

==== Cookie factory ====
Around 1880, the Olibet cookie factory was built on the eastern part of the property that belonged to the d'Estrée family in the early 18th century, between Rue du Port-au-Vin and Rue du Bac. For a time, the children of Suresnes came to buy from the concierge, who gave them broken cookies unsuitable for sale. Cookies in good condition were sold at the Parisian store on Rue de Rivoli. A rare experiment at the time, Olibert set up a nursery in its buildings to enable its working mothers to keep their jobs. Renowned for his social spirit, Mr. Olibet was elected deputy mayor of Suresnes in 1884, at the same time as the Guillaumet municipality, also an industrialist. The factory was demolished in 1940 to make way for the metallurgical industry.

==== Perfumery ====
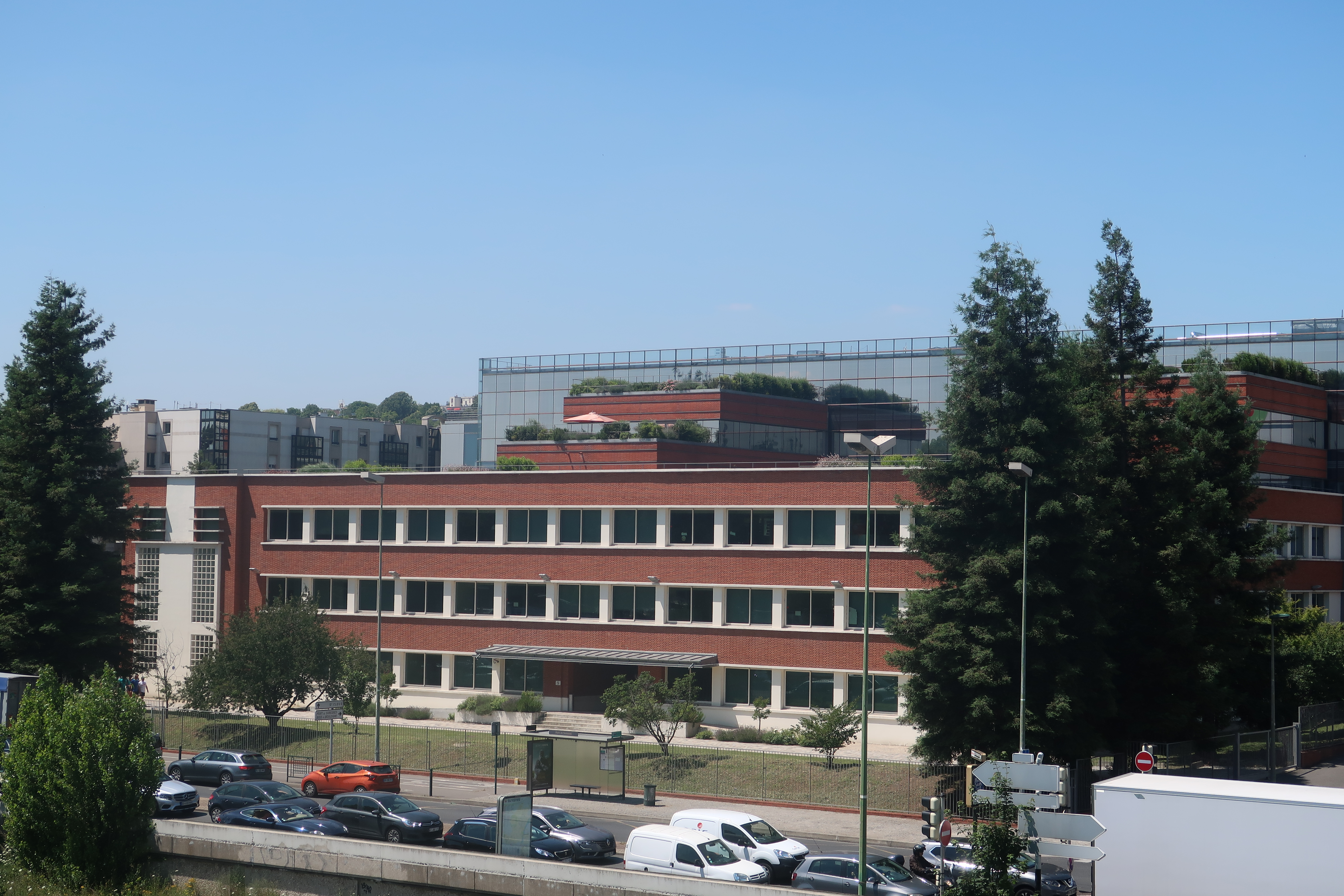
Former Coty factory near the Seine, now the headquarters of Bel, after having been that of Havas.

At the end of the 18th century, Suresnes was already home to the factory of Fargeon, Marie-Antoinette's perfumer, in the barn of a house on Rue de Saint-Cloud. He and his chemists used Damask roses, then grown on the slopes of Mont Valérien, near Puteaux. At the beginning of the 19th century, Lejeune manufactured perfumes for export on Rue de Neuilly, getting involved in the life of Suresnes by organizing festivities and publishing the magazine "Suresnes... tout l'monde débarque." Later, Hugues Guerlain (namesake of the famous brand) founded the Salomé brand, which Maurice Blanchet later acquired. But it was, above all, 1904 that marked the history of perfumery in Suresnes when François Coty bought the Source property to set up his factory. He made his brand a success, using advances in chemistry and sober, elegant bottles. Several bottles were made by Baccarat glassmakers, and one of them, Mr. Valentin, was even on Henri Sellier's municipal list. Famous perfumes such as L'Origan, Rose Jacqueminot, and Ambre Antique are produced at the Suresnes factory, where many women work. Initially built of wood, the building was later replaced by a new one in red brick, which has since been listed as a historic monument. In 1924, Maurice Blanquet moved to Suresnes with his brother and founded the Coryse-Salomé brand, combining Hugues Guerlain's brand with Mr. Quartier's Coryse brand. This, too, was a success. Also in 1924, Jean-Philippe Worth, a descendant of the couturier, founded a perfume brand in his name, manufactured by Maurice Blanchet. These perfume factories were located in the same district: the Coty factory at Château de la Source, the Blanchet factory on the grounds of the estate's kitchen garden, while Fargeon was established nearby. There was also the Hudnut company, specialized in pharmaceuticals and with a perfumery and cosmetics division. Finally, Maison Volnay, located near Mont Valérien, manufactured eau de toilettes and eau de Cologne for the capital's department stores.

== Third Republic (1900–1919) ==
=== Until the First World War ===
==== The 1900s ====
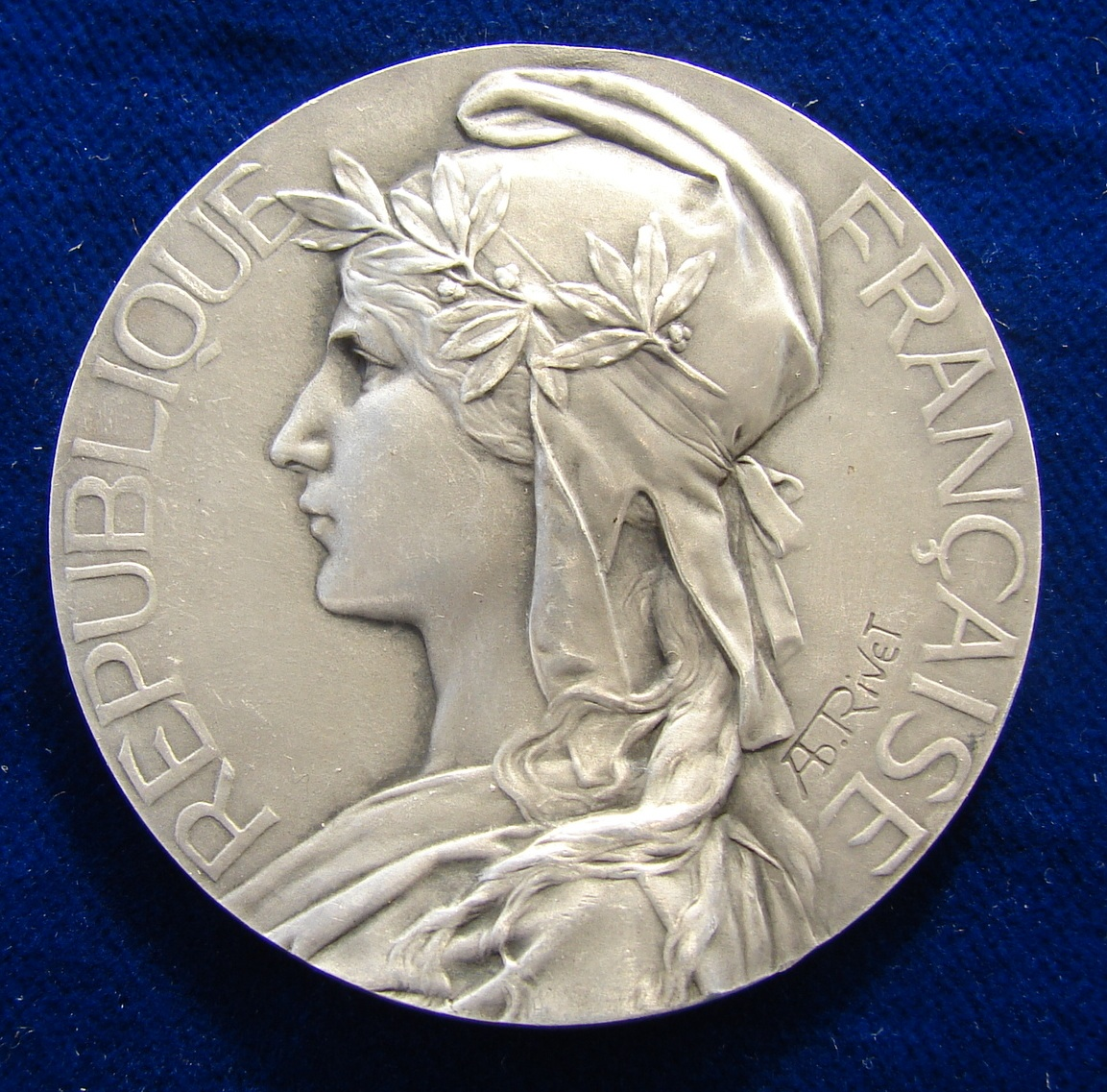
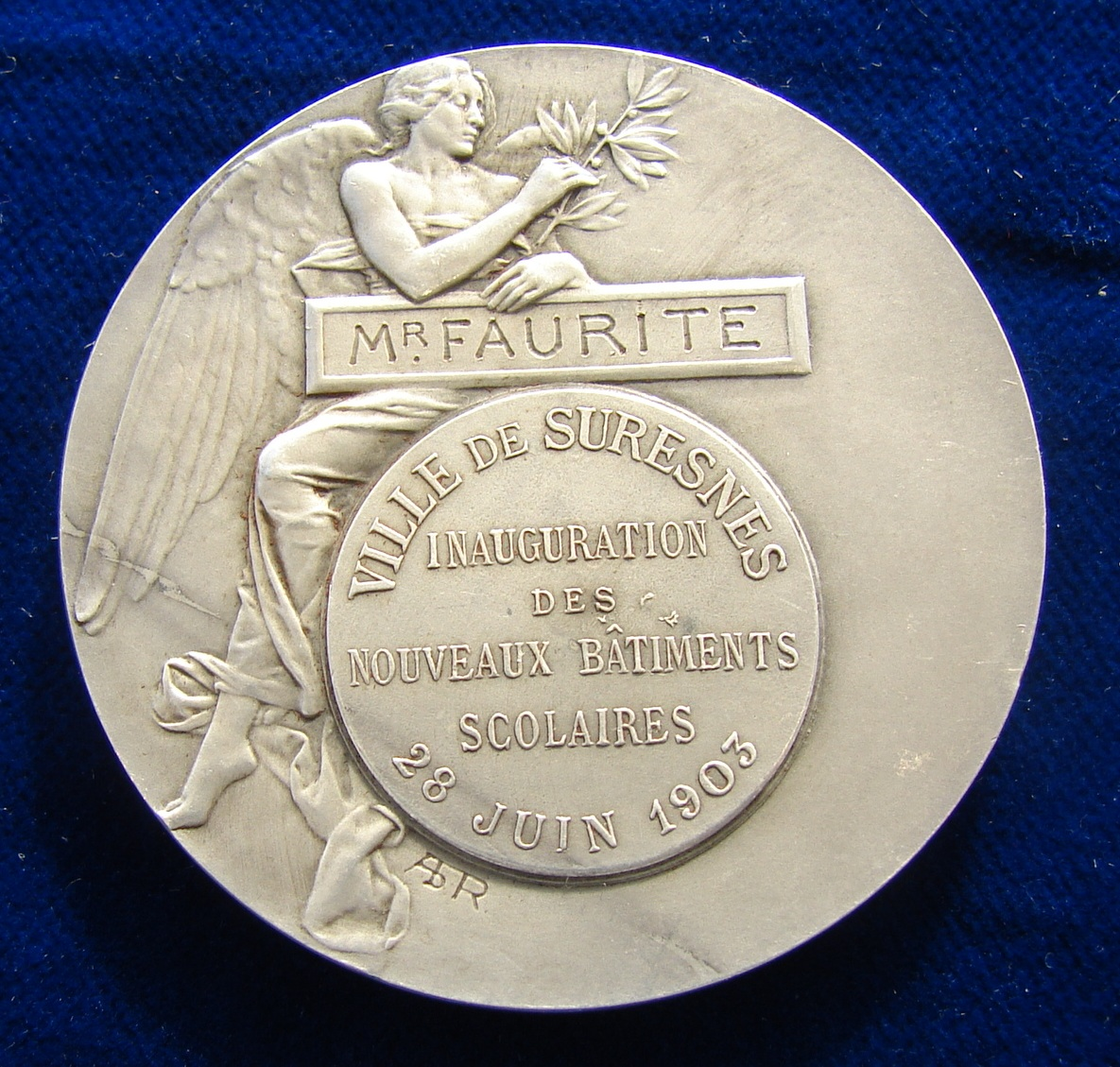
Municipal medal struck for the inauguration of new school buildings in 1903.

In the municipal elections of May 1900, the list led by Caron defeated that of Genteur. The victor accuses his predecessor of overspending on the construction of the village hall, but defends himself against critics who portray him as clerical and reactionary. In October, the municipality inaugurated what was to become the Musée de Suresnes, then a simple showcase in the marriage hall containing memorabilia bequeathed by Dr. Gillard and Edgar Fournier, Suresnes' first historian. In 1901, the land known as "Terres blanches" was purchased from the heirs of Suresnes industrialist Meunier to exploit the water from the Tertre fountain springs, which the Prefecture de Police laboratory had positively analyzed. In the center of Suresnes, a standpipe was even built to distribute water from this source. However, the initiative was not followed up on, as the mayor's opponents criticized it. The American cemetery was later established on the site of the spring. The laboratory reversed its decision in January 1906: the fountain was condemned, and its water was redirected to the sewers. According to the new municipality, the retirement home was deemed too costly, and the system of home help was reinstated.

In 1905, the law separating Church and State led to the departure of the teaching congregation of nuns who ran a girls' school at 15 Rue de Neuilly, therebyincreasing the shortage of places in public schools. The question of creating a new school complex was revived, to be located on Rue Vanier, (Note: According to the grammarian Victor-Augustin Vanier, born in Suresnes.) the name sacrificed by the previous municipality and now given back to the section of Rue Benoît-Malon between Rue de Neuilly and Rue Carnot. While waiting for a new school to be built, the girls were left in their old, vacant premises. In the May 1904 elections, Genteur again defeated Caron but left his seat as mayor to the industrialist Alphonse Huillard. Upon his arrival, the new municipality voted to reprimand his predecessors for the accounting deficit. Rue Vanier was renamed, along with several other roads. (Note: Rue du Moutier becomes Rue Émile-Zola, Place d'Armes becomes Place Trarieux, Rue des Écoles becomes Rue Jules-Ferry, Avenue du Viaduc becomes Rue Garibaldi, Rue des Sceaux-d'Eau becomes Rue Étienne-Dolet, part of Rue de la Tuilerie becomes Rue Jean-Jacques Rousseau, Rue Delafosse becomes Rue Flourens, part of Rue des Bas-Rogers becomes Rue Danton, Rue de la Groue becomes Rue Cluseret and Rue de la Mairie becomes Rue Berthelot.) After falling ill, Huillard was replaced by his deputy, Victor Diederich, on August 11, 1905.

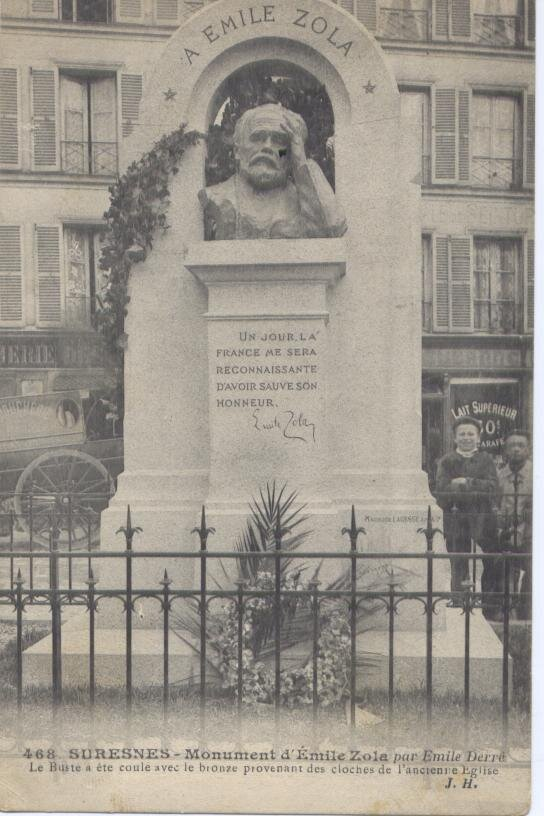
The monument to Émile Zola.

To finance new projects, on March 17, 1905, the municipal council ratified a loan of one million francs repayable over thirty years, the interest on which would be paid by a special octroi tax. The mayor's office then undertook many projects: clearing the Place Trarieux with the disappearance of the old houses on Rue du Four, widening Rue Étienne-Dolet and Rue Émile-Zola, renovating the old roads, improving links between the town center and the plateaux, creating ten new sewer streets, and re-establishing the old people's home. However, more than 150 owners of the roads affected by the work had to be dealt with. In 1904, the city's first summer camps were set up, enabling children to be sent to the countryside. The operation was repeated the following year in Adou, Le Buisson, and Longuesse (Loiret). A loan was also taken out to finance the project for a new school complex, to be named in homage to the pedagogue Jean Macé and built by the architect Loiseau on the land of a market gardener. The school complex (now known as the Collège Jean-Macé) was very modern for its time and was inaugurated in 1908 in the presence of Minister René Viviani. At the same time, an old and renowned educational establishment disappeared, located at 24 Rue de Neuilly. The Demoiselles Linder girls' boarding school (Jeanne-d'Arc institution) also existed on Rue Saint-Antoine (Note: Now Rue Ledru-Rollin.) and closed before the Second World War, having moved to 56 Rue du Mont-Valérien.

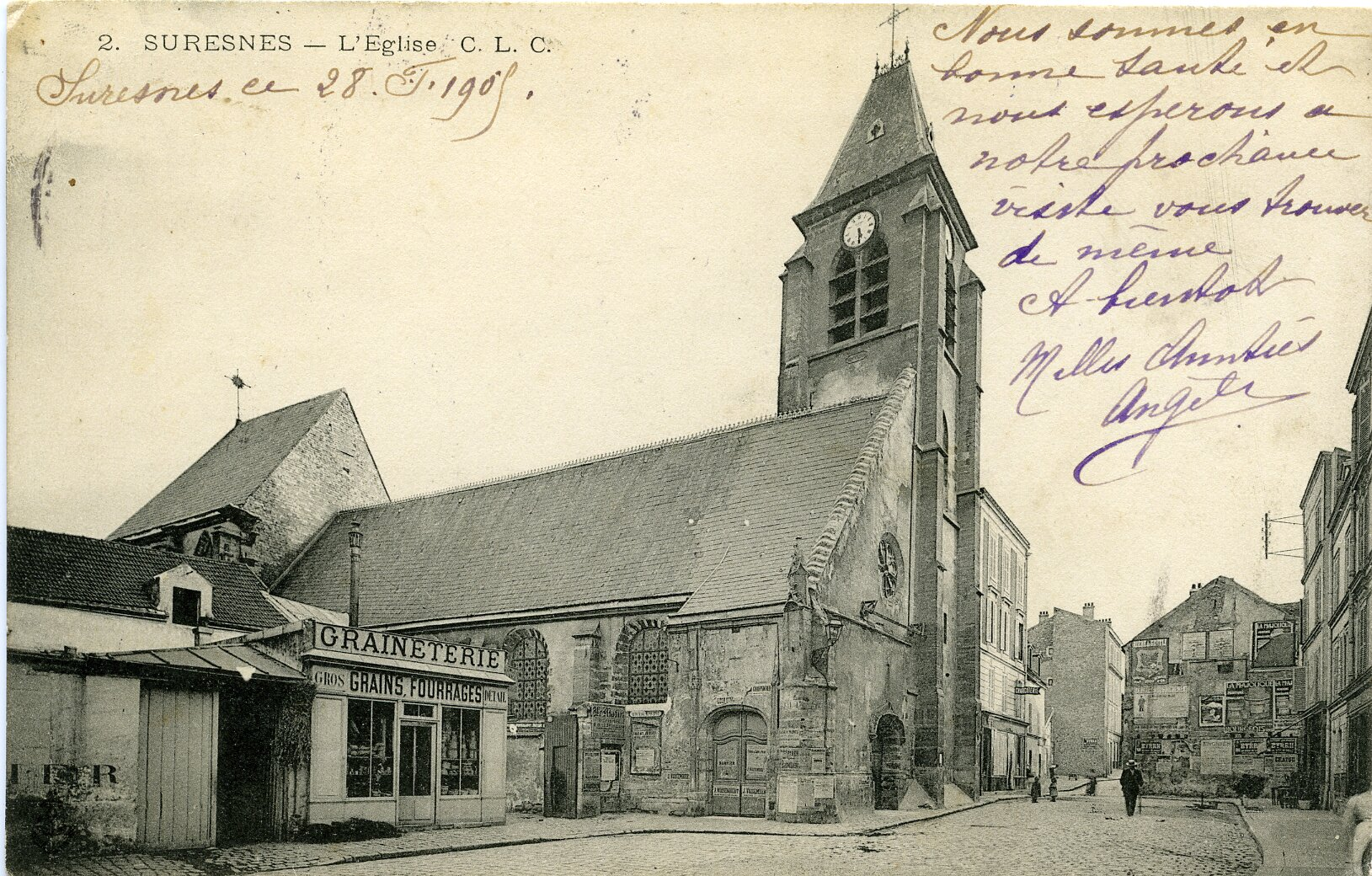
The old Saint-Leufroy church, destroyed in 1906.

Following the 1905 law abolishing the Concordat, the inventory of church property in Suresnes took place from February 5 to 7, 1906. Featuring a Romanesque bell tower porch dating from the 11th-12th centuries, the Saint-Leufroy church, which stood on a plot of approximately six acres, was declared to be in ruins and valued at 68,900 francs. Apart from religious objects, there were no valuable possessions, almost all the statues being made of plaster, for example. The church had already been struck off the list of historic monuments in 1886, but 24 paintings were reclassified by the law of March 30, 1887.

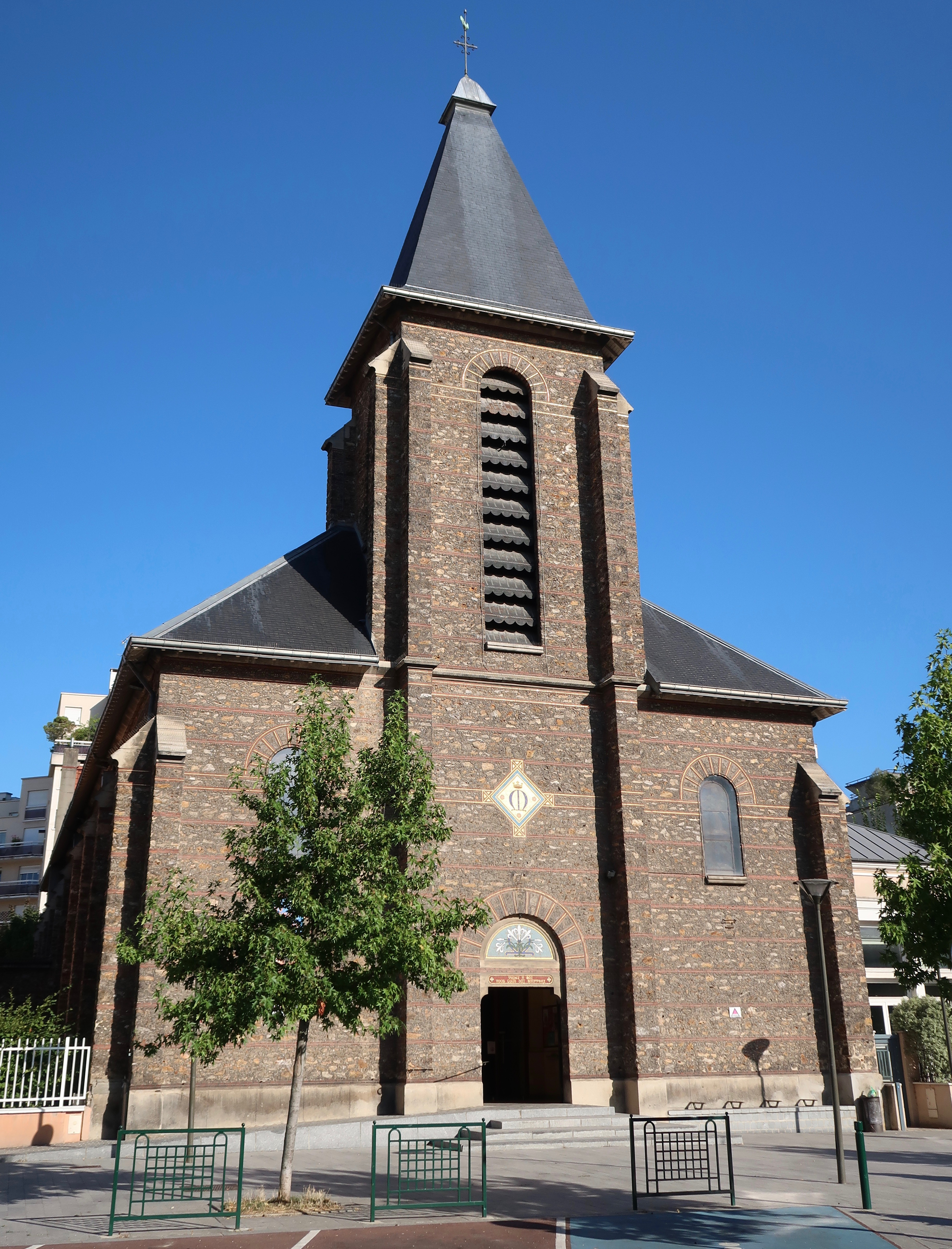
The new church of the Immaculate Heart of Mary.

Religious objects, some religious paintings, the pulpit, and the organs are sold. The money raised was used to maintain the local older people's homes. During the dispersal, the notoriously anticlerical mayor praised "the priest's correct attitude". The state of disrepair of the church was advanced; at the time, it belonged to the commune, having pre-dated the Concordat of 1802. Necessary renovation work had not been carried out, while an arson attack had affected the north chapel in 1904. Concerned, the Archbishop of Paris wrote to the mayor on April 14, 1906, noting the danger to the faithful of visiting a building in such a state, which the mayor was nevertheless not legally bound to maintain. Faced with the council's refusal, the religious authorities threatened to stop worshiping in the church. On April 27, the council gave in and voted to demolish the church. On June 2, Minister Aristide Briand wrote to the mayor, advising him to demolish “only what is strictly necessary.” The municipality ignored this advice. In the tense context of the passing of the law, the affair caused controversy in the major Catholic newspapers, further aggravated by the affair of the church bells: after the war of 1870, only one remained and, in 1897, the parish priest Combel had acquired four of them by subscription, which became, after the demolition of the old church, the property of the commune.

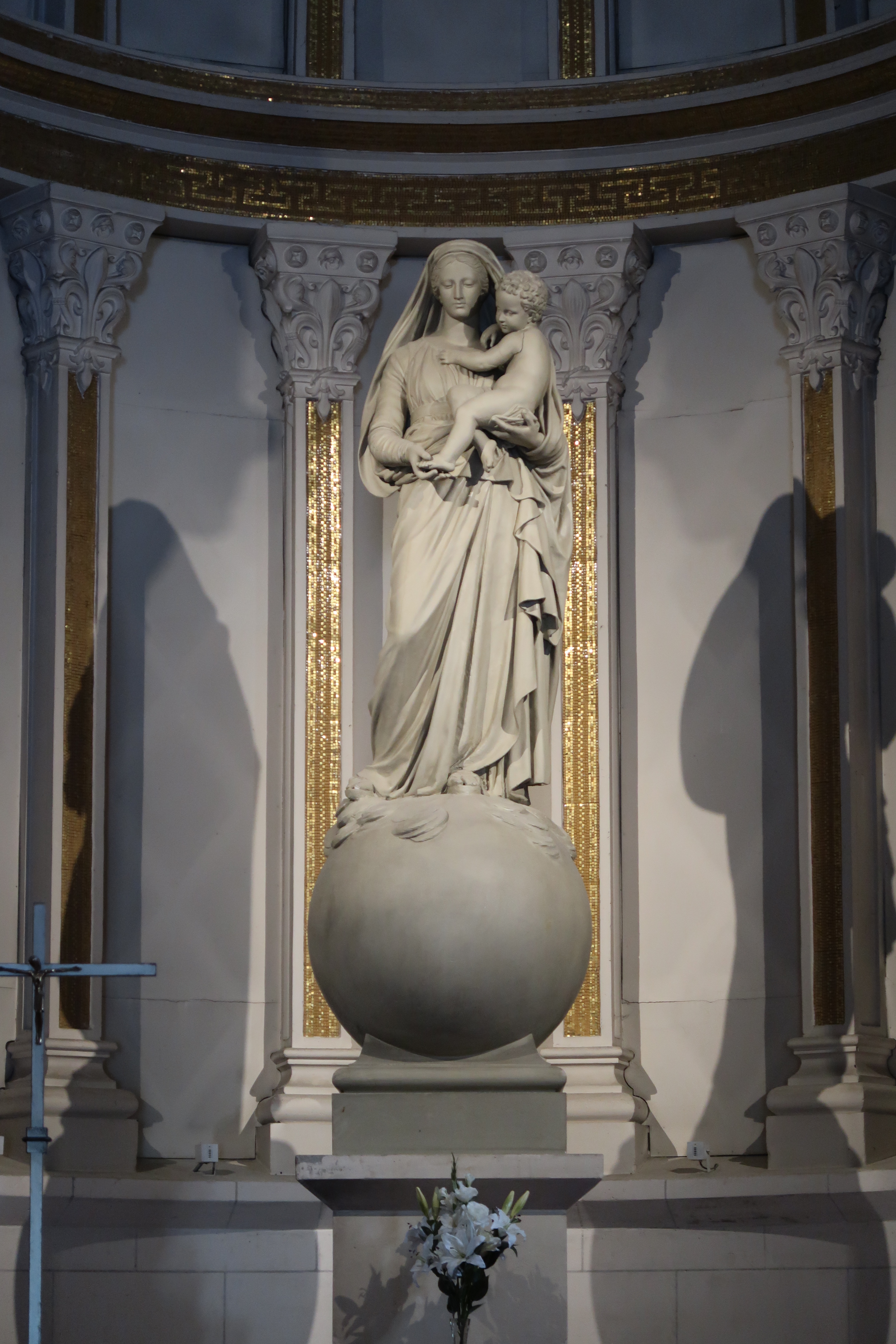
Statue of the Virgin and Child, in the choir of the church. Dating from 1829, it was initially intended to adorn a church located on Mont Valérien.

On July 26, 1907, the town council decided to melt one of them down and create a statue of Émile Zola from the resulting bronze, sculpted by Émile Derré. The inauguration took place on April 12, 1908, with the participation of Gustave Charpentier and the Mimi Pinson conservatory he directed. The writer's son, Jacques-Émile Zola, was also present. The mayor declared at the ceremony: "This bell has rung enough error to now proclaim the truth". The event was disrupted by a few anti-Dreyfus supporters; one demonstrator was even arrested and, in the afternoon that followed, Camelots du roi tried to topple the bust set up in Place Trarieux. The other bells were melted down; the material was sold to maintain the retirement home. The writer Léon Bloy protested: "The bust of Émile, inaugurated in Suresnes in 1908, with great fanfare, is said to have been made from the bronze bells of the disused and stripped church. What mortal ever achieved such an honor? This poor bronze, once blessed to call men to prayer and to ward off lightning, was transformed by force into a simulacrum of stupidity and infamy! [...] I wouldn't want to pass, at midnight, in front of the bronze blessed by this scoundrel". On its pedestal is engraved a phrase by Émile Zola, written during the Dreyfus Affair: “One day, France will be grateful to me for having saved its honor.”

The decision was nevertheless taken to build a new church, the Cœur-Immaculé-de-Marie, whose foundation stone was laid by Cardinal Richard on December 15, 1907. It was originally equipped with a pulpit, which has since been deposited in the municipal museum. Built-in 1908-1909 by architect Édouard Bérard, it features a monumental statue of the Virgin and Child standing on a globe, an 1829 plaster by Jean-Pierre Cortot commissioned by Forbin-Janson for his neo-Byzantine church project. Among the stained-glass windows created between 1907 and 1911, several by Calor and inspired by drawings by Henri Brémont, pay tribute to the life and history of Suresno, particularly in terms of religion (ascent of the Calvary, winegrowers' processions on Saint-Vincent, Saint Geneviève, Marguerite Naseau, etc.).

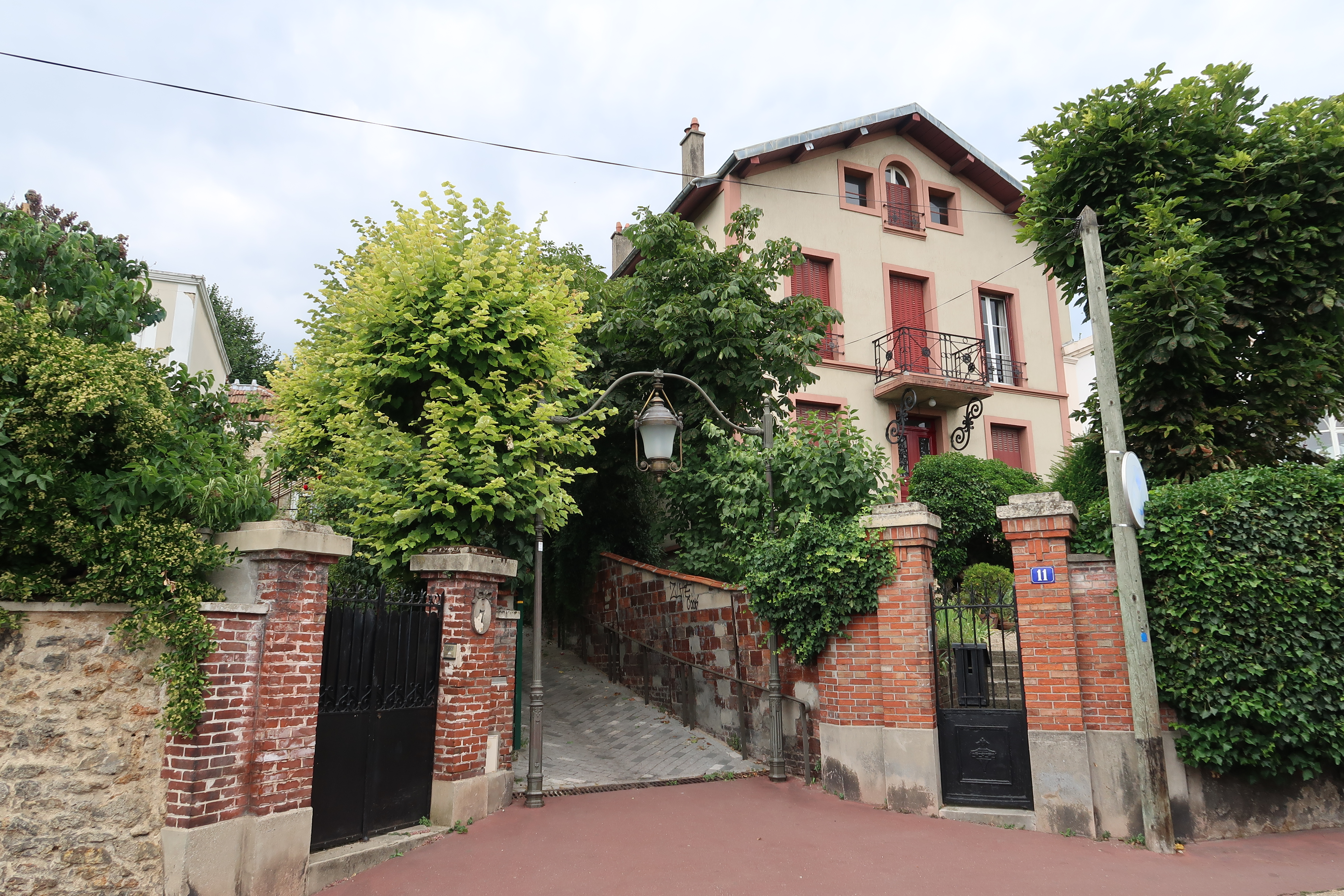
House on the hillsides of the northern plateau: example of progressive urbanization at the turn of the century.

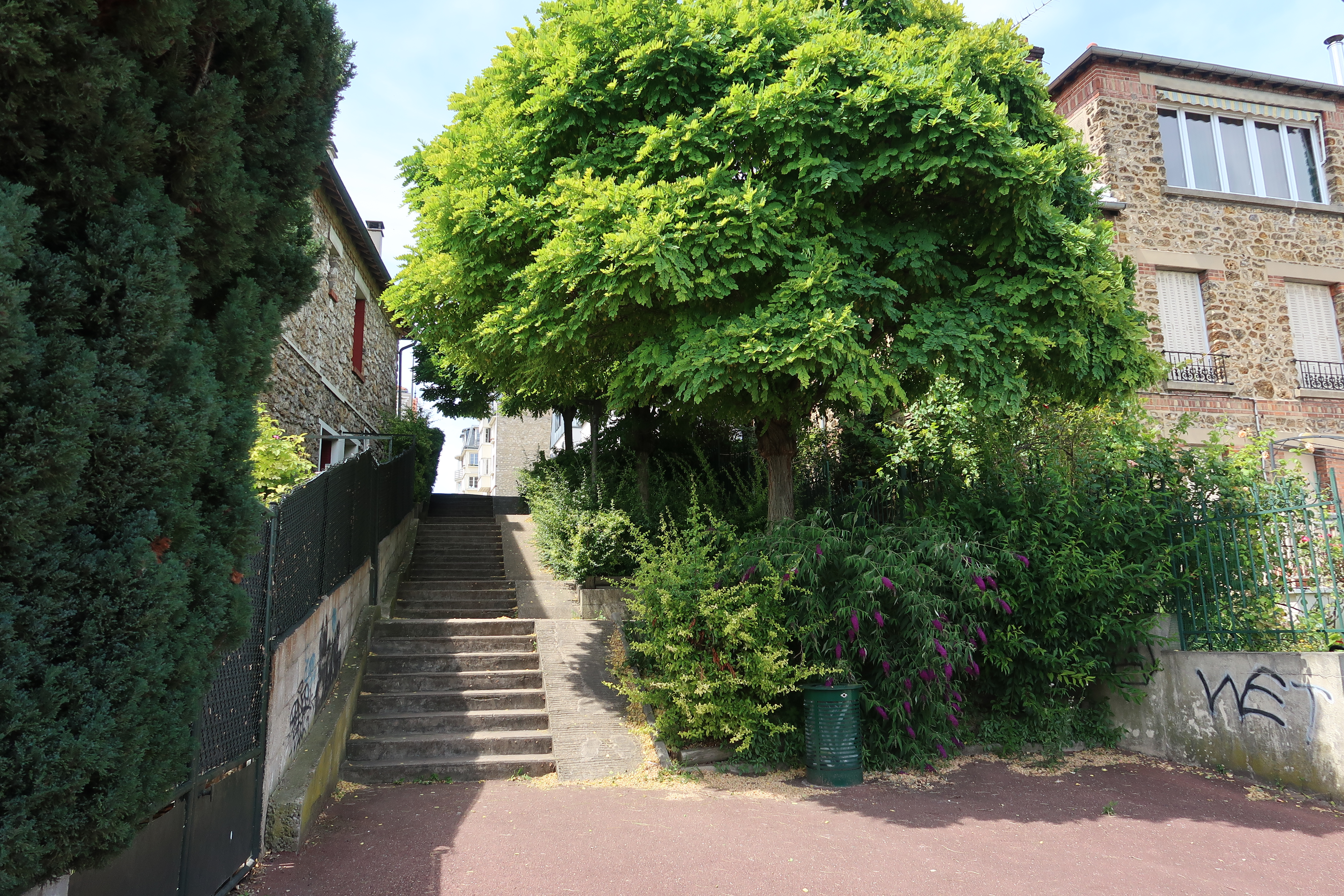
Another house on the hillsides.

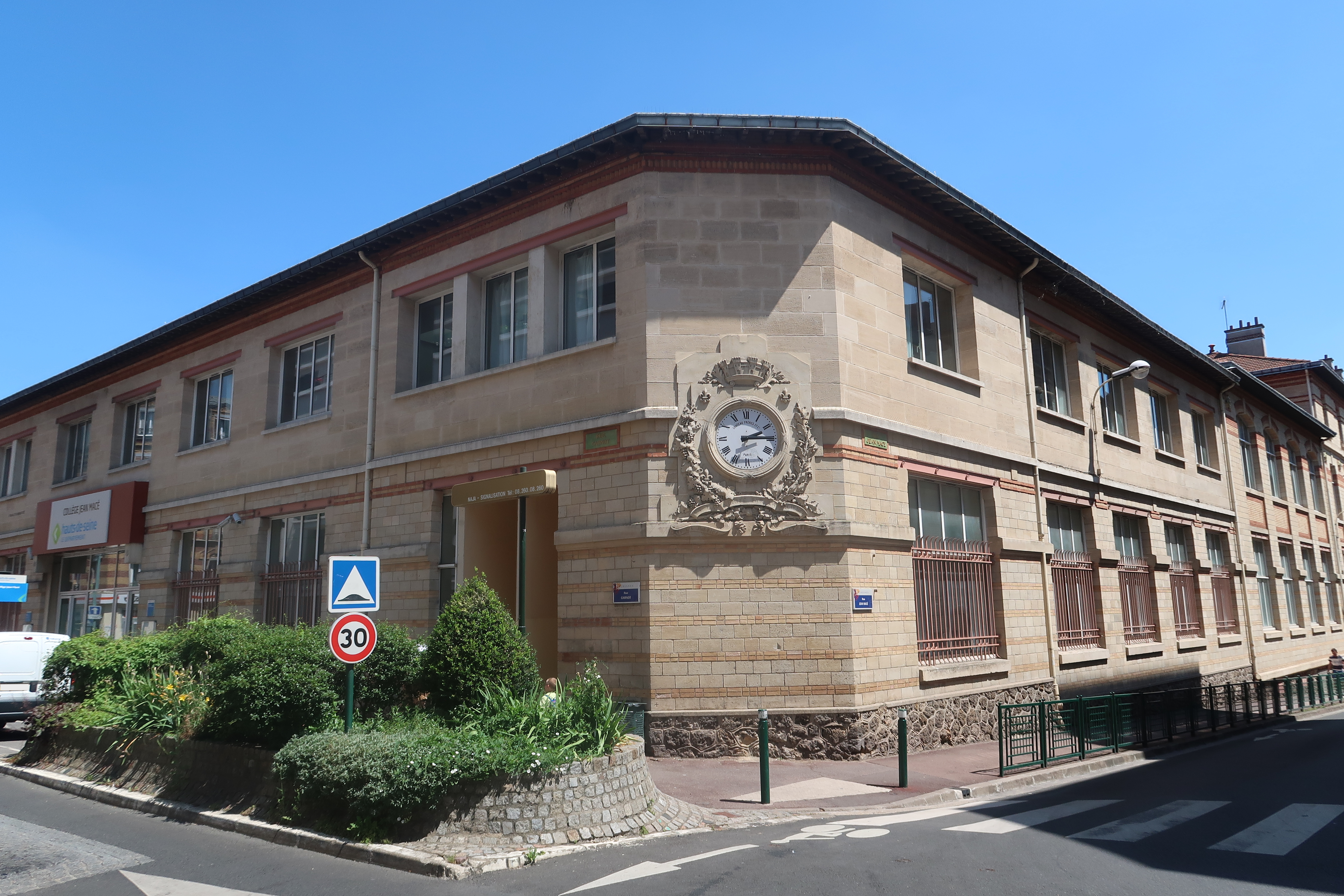
The Jean-Macé school, which became a college in 1968.

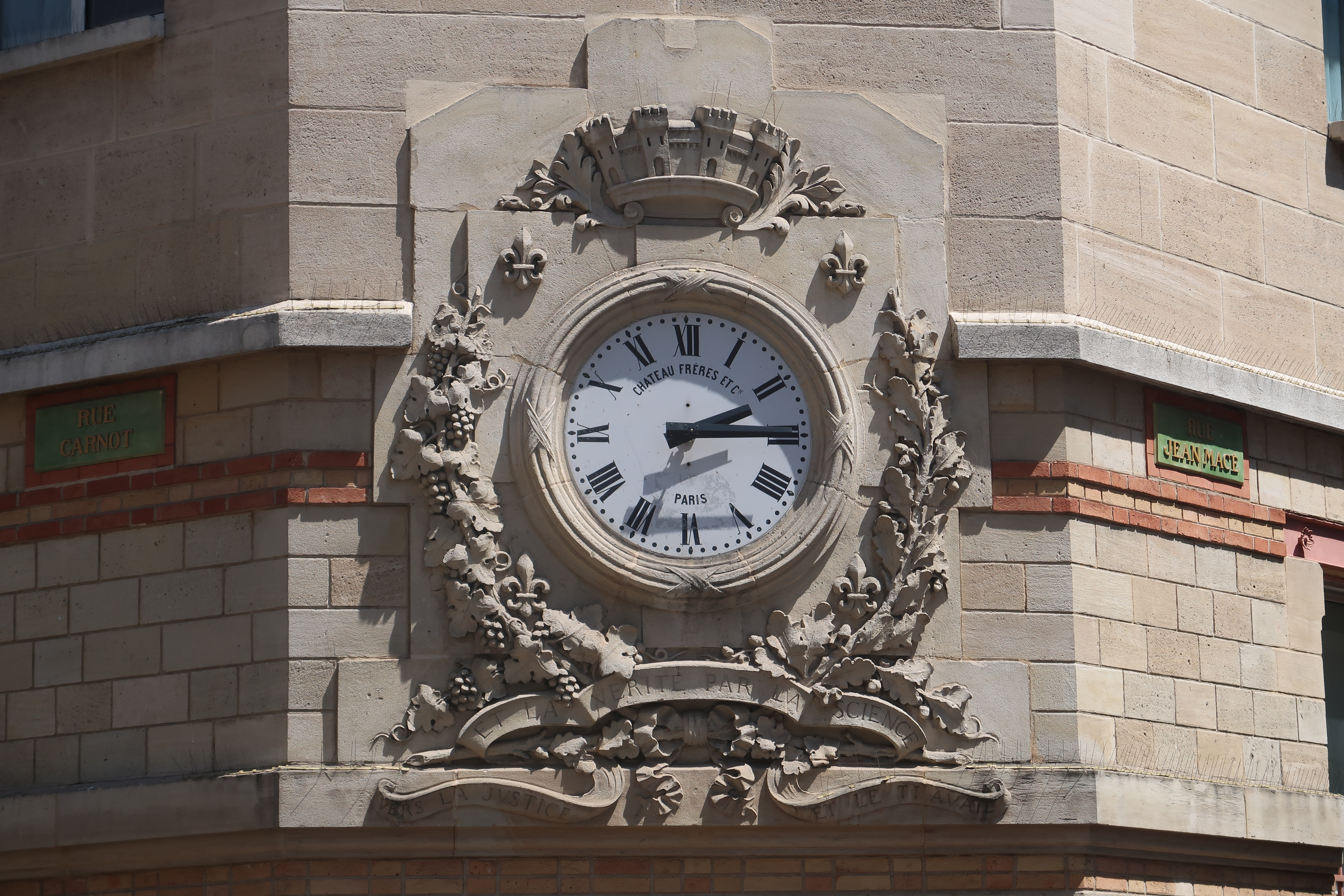
Clock on the facade of the school, long stopped.

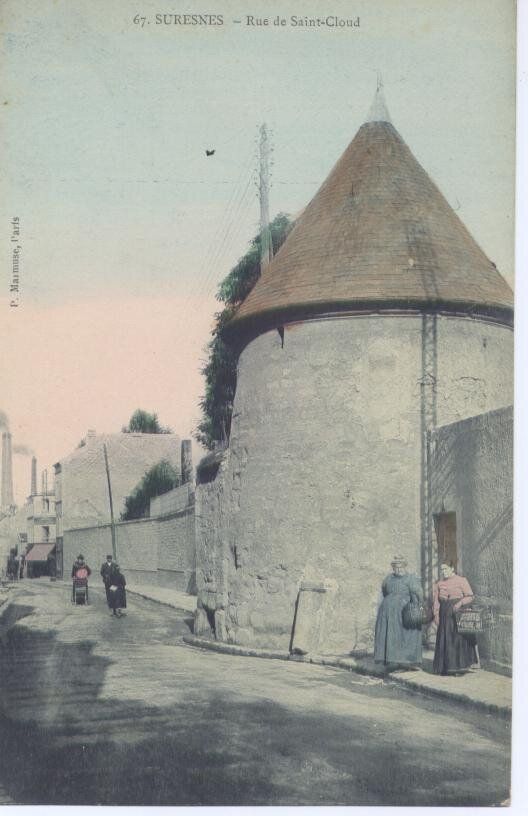
Remains of the postern gate of rue de Saint-Cloud in an old photograph.

The population of Suresnes continued to grow: in 1906, there were 1,344 houses with 4,125 households, representing 12,474 French citizens and 299 foreigners. Work continued improving the streets (147,835 m2), and a sweeping tax was introduced to finance street cleaning. In October 1907, the widow Gardenat-Lapostol donated her house at 5 Rue des Rosselins to serve as the retirement home. The street was subsequently renamed in her honor. In the same year, the postern that closed the Porte de Saint-Cloud in the 16th century was demolished to align Rue de Saint-Cloud with the old Vaux d'Or spring, which now flows through the grounds of the nursing home. In the May 1908 elections, Victor Diederich was re-elected mayor. The municipality now had thirteen committees. A medical dispensary was set up to assist people in need, at 15 Rue de Neuilly.

==== 1910s ====
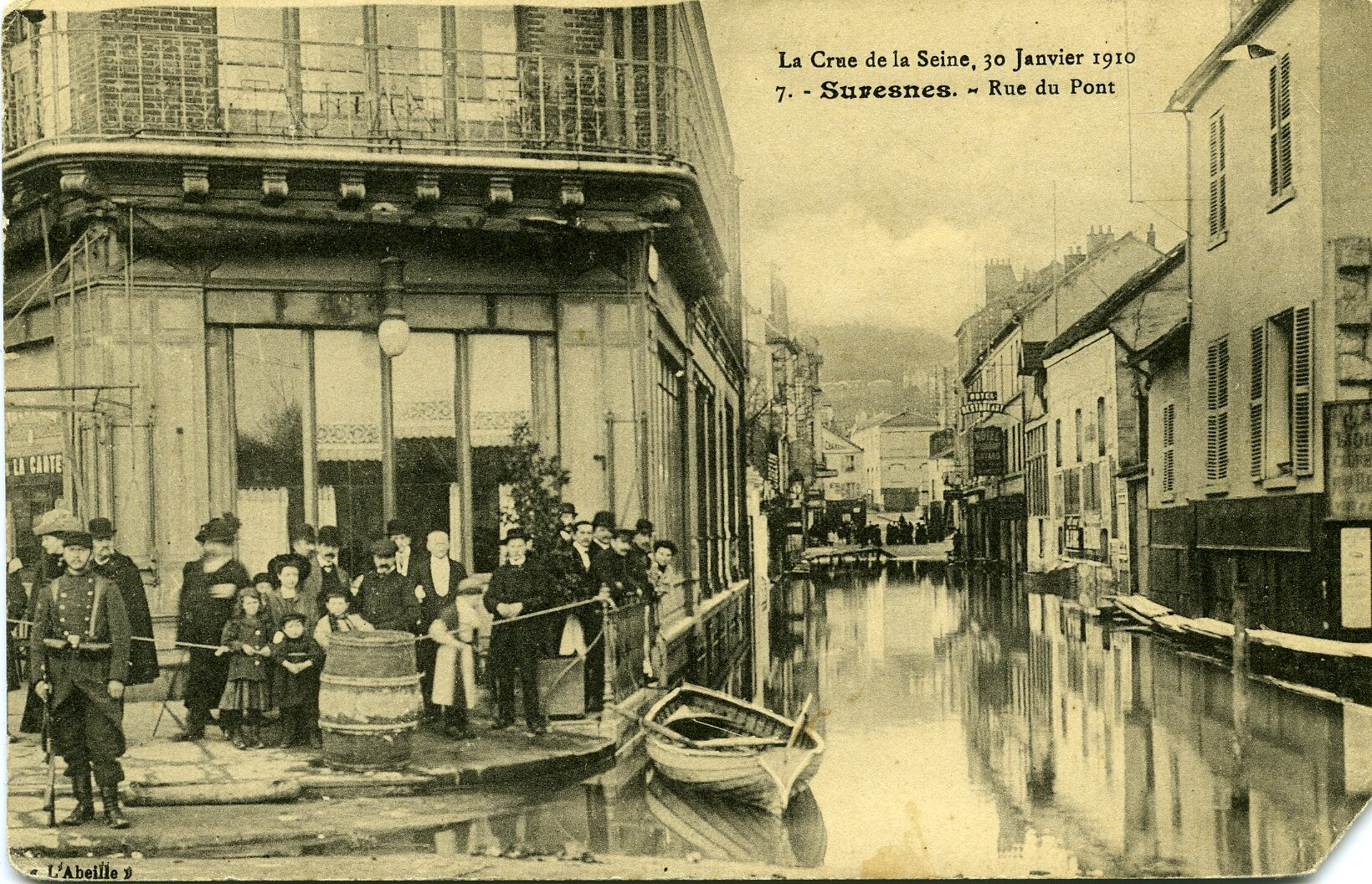
The flooded Rue du Pont.

In 1910, Suresnes was hit by the flooding of the Seine, with the river invading the quays and low-lying areas as far south as Place Eugène-Sue, north of Rue de Verdun and central Rue des Bourets. Historically, built on a sandy plateau that is inaccessible to flooding, the majority of the city escapes flooding. However, flooded streets meant that residents had to travel by boat or on temporary footbridges alongside their homes. The Suresnes bridge remained accessible at both ends. After the floods had subsided, the devastated buildings had to be restored, and the unemployed helped, thanks to 143,193 francs collected from the State, the Prefecture, companies, and the town of Keighley. Subsequently, a new development plan for the Seine enabled the construction of the new sluice dam. Le Journal wrote: "In Suresnes, the water rose overnight by 40 cm, invading houses on the quay up to the second floor and causing further devastation in the interior of the commune. In Puteaux, five new factories closed their doors. The number of unemployed is rising daily." Le Matin added: "50 engineer soldiers garrisoned at Mont Valérien, mounted on bachots (boats) from the lakes of the Bois de Boulogne, rescued the inhabitants through the windows, who were transported to hotels in Suresnes. Canal automobiles (motorized boats) crisscrossed the river, helping to supply supplies."

When the Entente Cordiale was signed, Mayor Alphonse Huillard proposed twinning Suresnes and Puteaux with the industrial town of Keighley, which his English wife knew. Exchange trips were organized with workers and shopkeepers. In October 1909, Suresnes renamed the part of rue de Penthièvre within its territory after the British town (where the Entente Cordiale Committee was based and where Huillard lived); today it is Avenue Georges-Pompidou. In June 1911, the English mayor visited Suresnes and presented a silver cup in thanks for the welcome. This twinning, perhaps the first in Franco-English history, came to an end with the outbreak of the First World War.

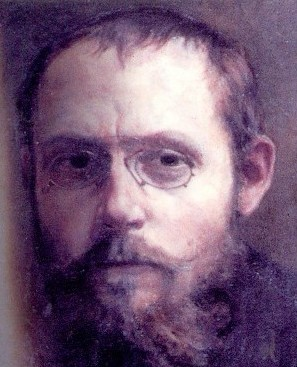
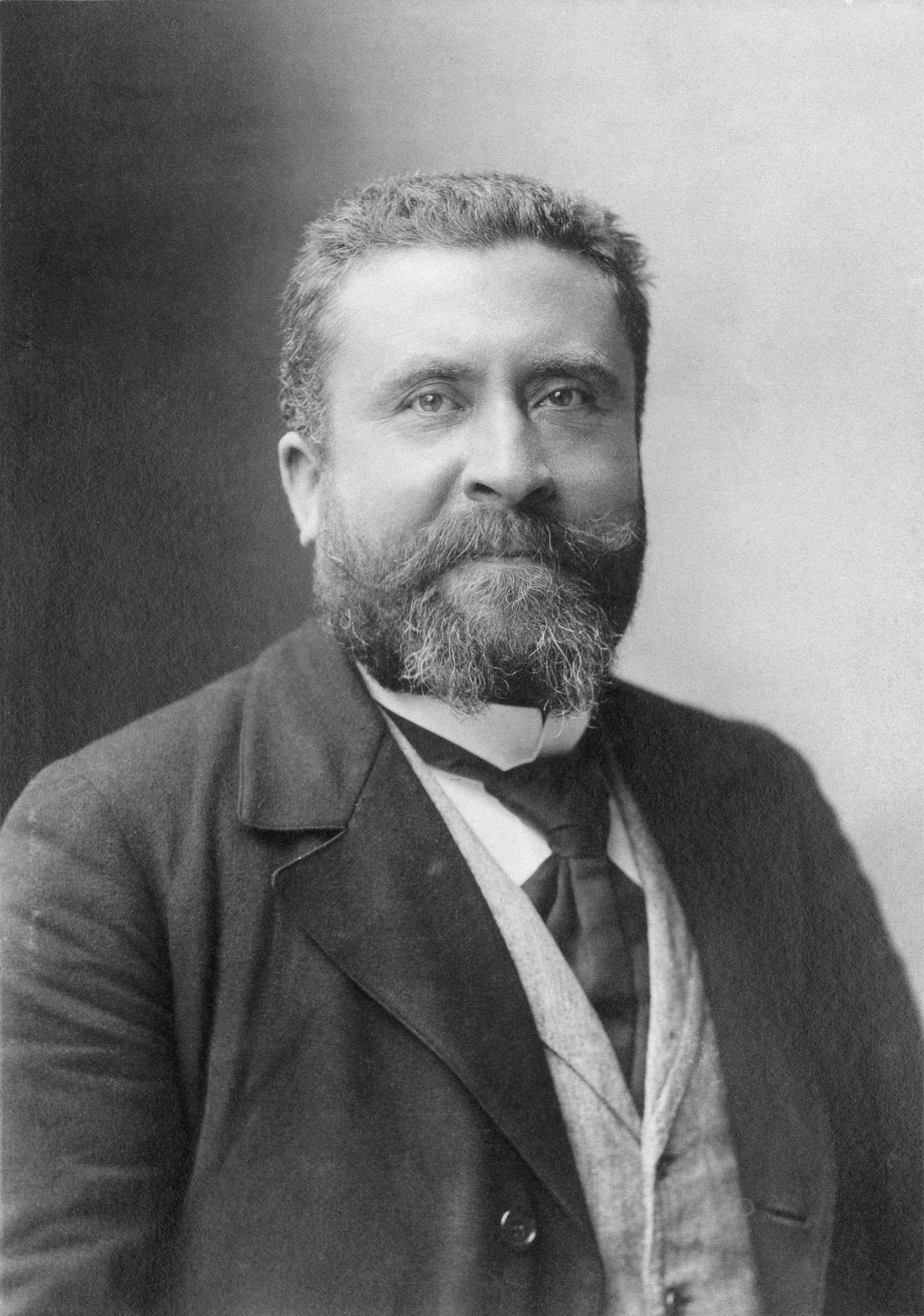
Left: Charles Péguy. Right: Jean Jaurès. The two friends enjoyed walking from Paris to Suresnes, where the writer had his printing house.

In 1912, the mayor signed a contract with the Compagnie des Eaux to distribute water to these new districts, whereas the previous 1864 treaty limited the height to 90 meters. In the May 1912 elections, Diederich was re-elected. That same year, Genteur died and left a bequest, the interest on which would be distributed every July 14 to two deserving young girls. Like the rosière, this prize still existed in the 1960s, thanks to the municipality's contribution, but the distribution date was changed due to the school vacations. In 1912, a project was signed to build a shower bath near the dispensary, although work did not begin until after the war. The municipality also took out a 225,000-franc loan to build a school on the northern plateau. These years also saw the development of hospital relief, assistance for large families, and compulsory daily assistance allowances.

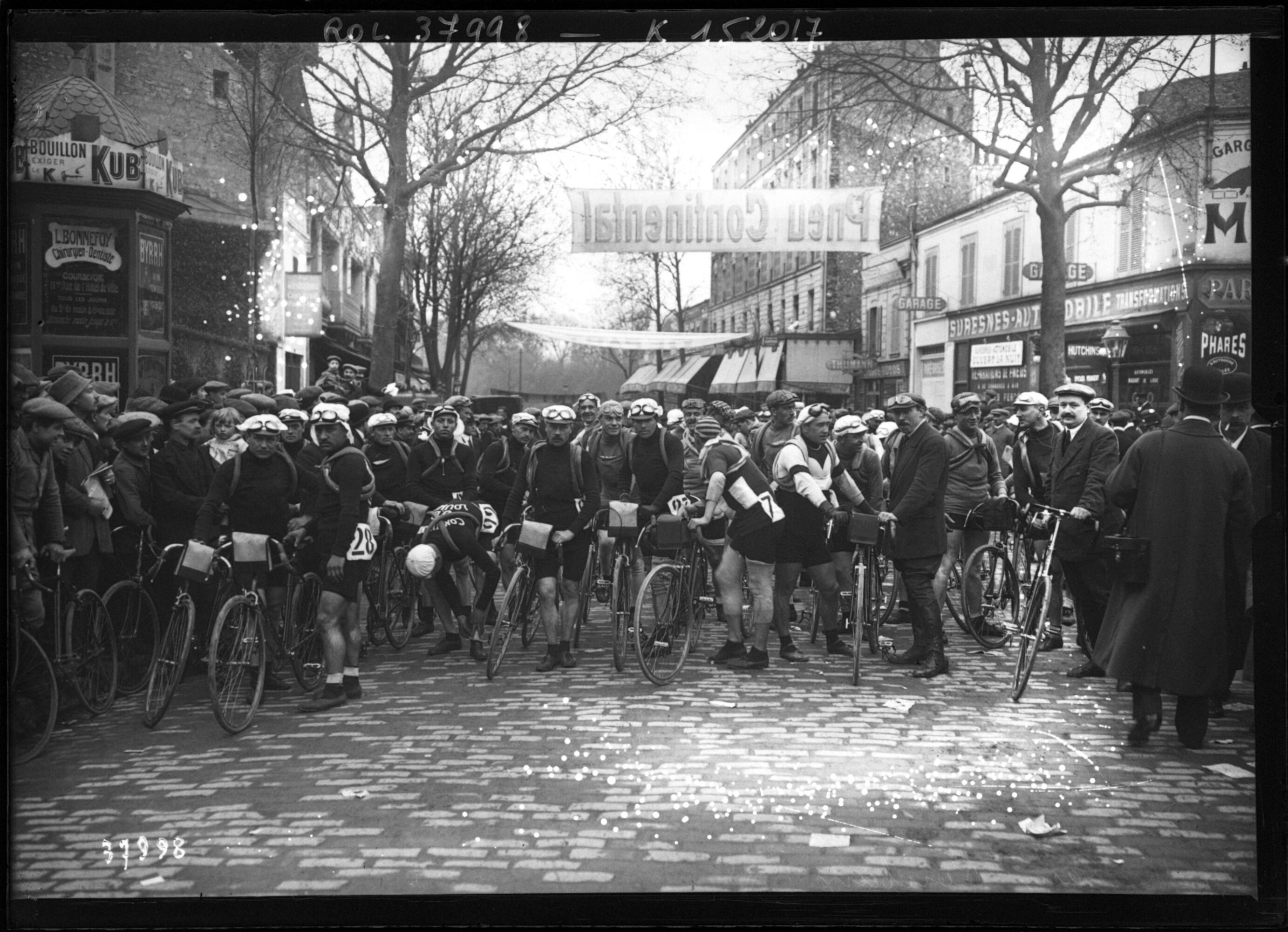
Start of the Paris-Roubaix cycle race in Suresnes in 1914.

The writer Charles Péguy — certainly on the advice of Rodolphe Simon of La Revue Socialiste — chose to publish his works at the Suresno printing works run by Richard and Husson, located at 9 Rue du Pont. In December 1897, Jeanne d'Arc was printed there. The printing works subsequently moved to 13 Rue Pierre-Dupont and changed ownership. Péguy had his Cahiers de la Quinzaine printed there. He used to walk from Paris to Suresnes through the Bois de Boulogne, accompanied by his friend Jean Jaurès. Louis Boulonnois, who devoted an article to Charles Péguy in 1919, wrote: “A Jaurès who, standing at the spindly cast-iron or metal parapets of the Suresnes bridge, looked towards Puteaux, admired, knew how to admire as a modern spectator all the industrial beauty of this part of the Seine, or looking at the other side, planted upright, facing the river, he looked, he admired, he recorded, he saw like a Frenchman the curved and noble river descending at the feet of the admirable lines of the hillsides.” During this period, the Suresno printing house also published the first editions of works by writers such as Romain Rolland, André Suarès, Julien Benda, Jean, Jérôme Tharaud, and Georges Sorel. After his death in August 1914 during the Battle of the Marne, Charles Péguy is honored in Suresnes, with the Rue des Champs being renamed after him.

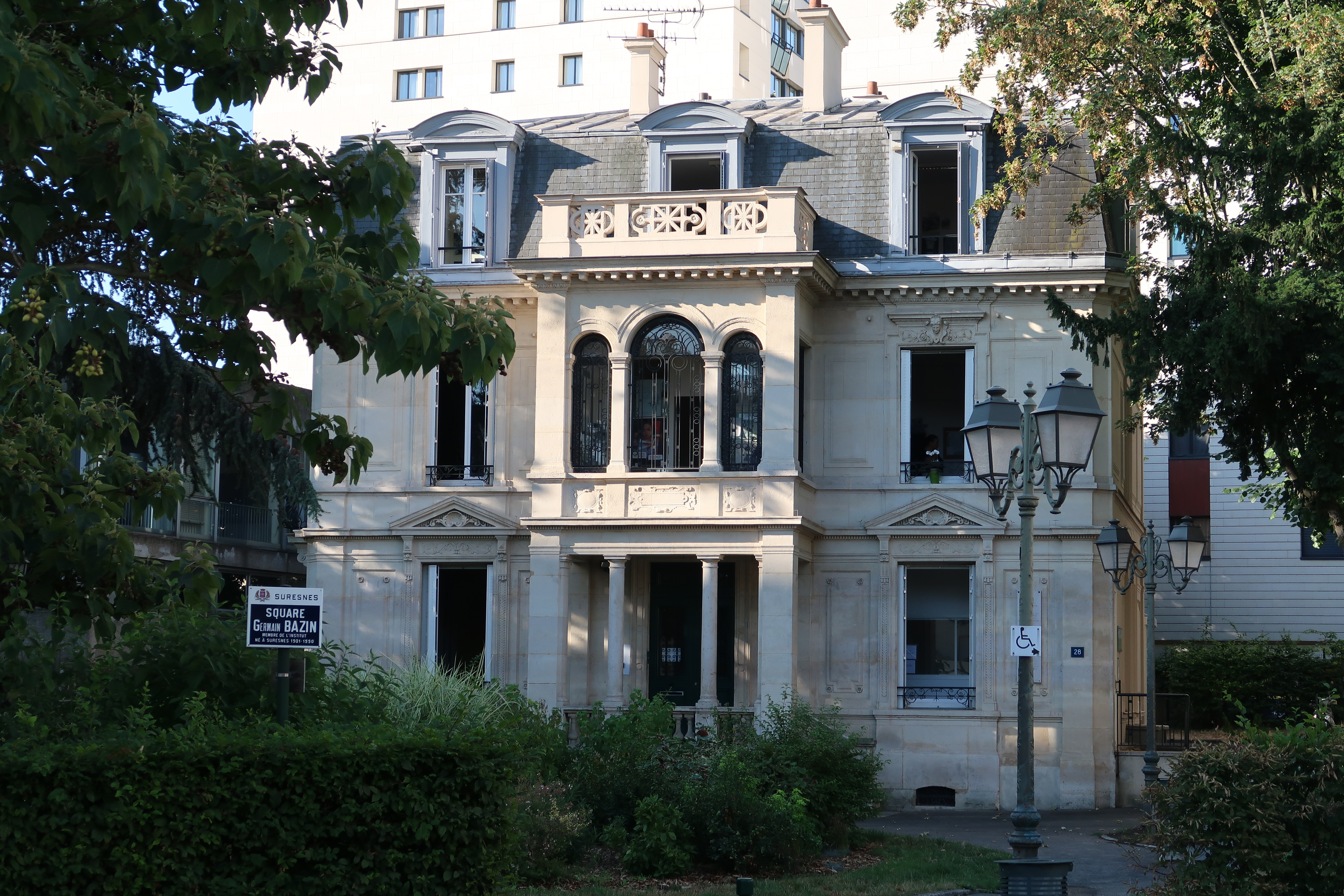
House called “Château de la Grève,” which today houses municipal services.

During the same decade, writer Charles-Albert Cingria enjoyed visiting family members in Suresnes: "They were relatives of mine, charming and fine people, who were employed in a wagon house in Suresnes. It was a joy for me to go and see them [...]. We talked, laughed, and had a great time. In the evenings, before parting, we'd still have blond aperitifs at La Belle-Gabrielle. Writer Léon Werth was more critical of the influx of Parisians to the town bordering Mont Valérien: "Suresnes is spoiled by Paris. Parisians come here as if it were a tourist destination. It's like a Cook agency for shopkeepers and midinettes organizing Suresnes Sundays. There are vast, solemn refectories for first-class travelers and well-known restaurants where, sometimes between shadows, Second Empire courtiers and car thieves dine."

Germain Bazin, a member of the Institut, lived in Suresnes for many years and is honored by a square in front of the Château de la Grève. In reality, it's a small Napoleon III-style townhouse built in 1867 by Duttenhoffer for the Meillassoux brothers, dyers from Suresnes. It owes its name to a strike that took place shortly before its construction, due to the 1867 Universal Exhibition, which caused prices to rise. Today, it houses the municipal social affairs department and the town hall's cellar.

=== World War I ===
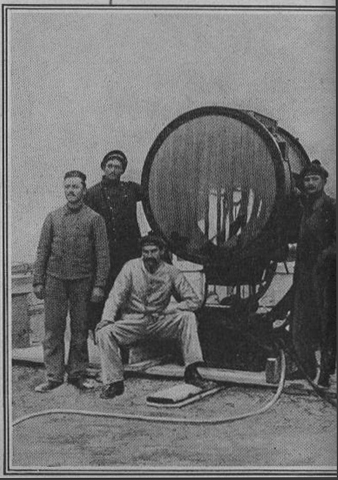
Projector used in 1915 in the Mont-Valérien fortress against German forces.

When war is declared, the town council meets on August 2. Victor Diederich, a native of Lorraine, expressed his confidence in the French army. On August 6, military requisitions were carried out: 80 horses were taken from industrialists Guillaumet and Olibet and various shopkeepers. Olibet also helped to arm the fort. In Rue Sentou and Rue Salomon-de-Rothschild, at L'Hewittic, premises were requisitioned to house contingents of the 22nd section of the COA (Commissaires et ouvriers d'administration). An artillery contingent also moved into the dam's foundry. The Jean-Macé school, whose pupils are transferred to the Jules-Ferry school, where boys and girls alternate half-days, becomes Auxiliary Military Hospital No. 246 thanks to the French Ladies' Association. It was equipped with one hundred beds and, from September onwards, received only lightly wounded, sick, and convalescing patients. A section of the fortress's pigeon fanciers also distinguished themselves during the conflict. One of the birds was even cited in the regimental order, "for having succeeded in transmitting the last message from the commander of the fort, before its surrender", while soldiers from Mont Valérien were taking part in the battle of Fort de Vaux (1916). The fortress, home to the 8th Signal Regiment since 1913, had seen some units pass through since the beginning of the Third Republic, including the 30th Territorial Infantry and the 5th Engineers' telegraph sappers.

The war, which mobilized many workers, forced some factories to close. To combat the consequences of unemployment, canteens run by the mayor's wife were set up on Rue du Bac and Rue du Mont-Valérien. At the Saint Joseph dispensary, Sister Claire also organized a soup kitchen. After the Battle of Charleroi, which drove people from northern France into exile, Suresnes welcomed 439 families (489 adults and 356 children). Faced with the advance of the Germans, some Suresnois even left the town for the provinces. On the other side of the Seine, Bagatelle and Longchamp were transformed into cattle pens. On September 30, the municipality set up an unemployment fund, financed by state subsidies, the town itself, and donations. The following year, faced with the impossibility of alleviating unemployment, the city issued bonds for a total of 175,000 francs, under the conditions laid down by the decree of December 15, 1914, which allowed them to be redeemed at maturity.

Manufacture of shells and machine guns at the Darracq factories

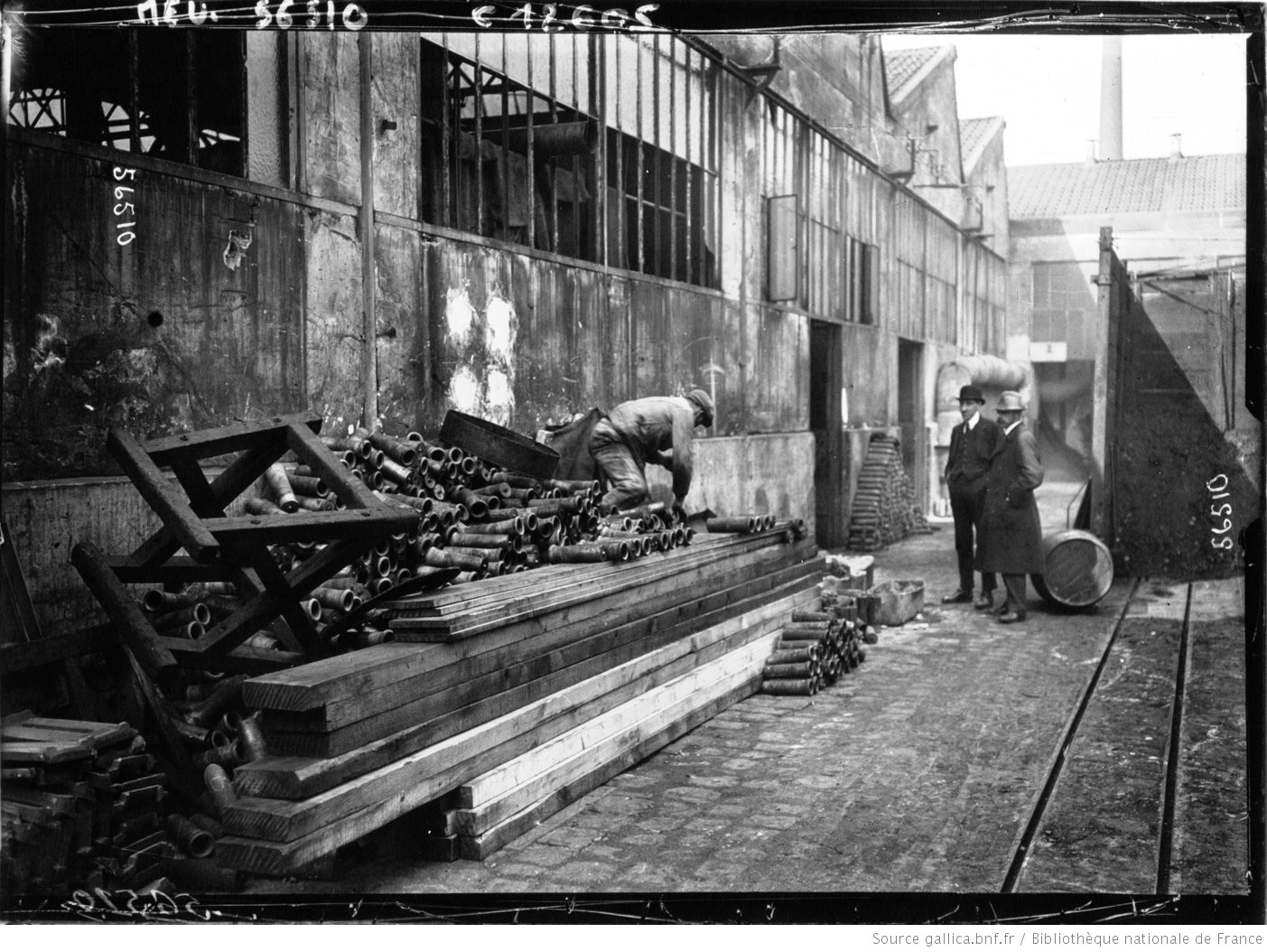
The manufacture of 75 shells at the Darracq factory in Suresnes: raw shells just after leaving the oven.

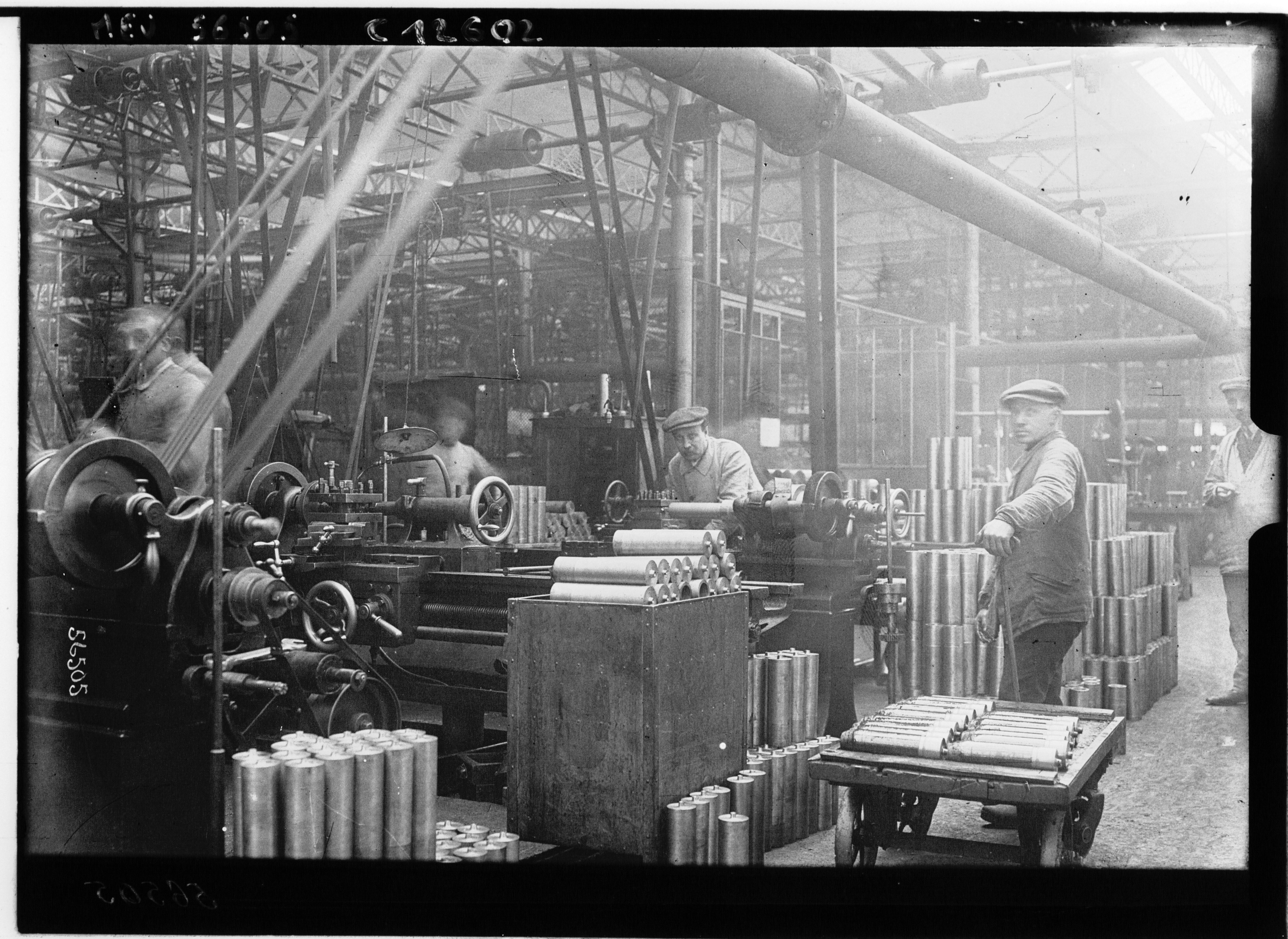
The manufacture of 75 shells at the Darracq factory in Suresnes (filming).

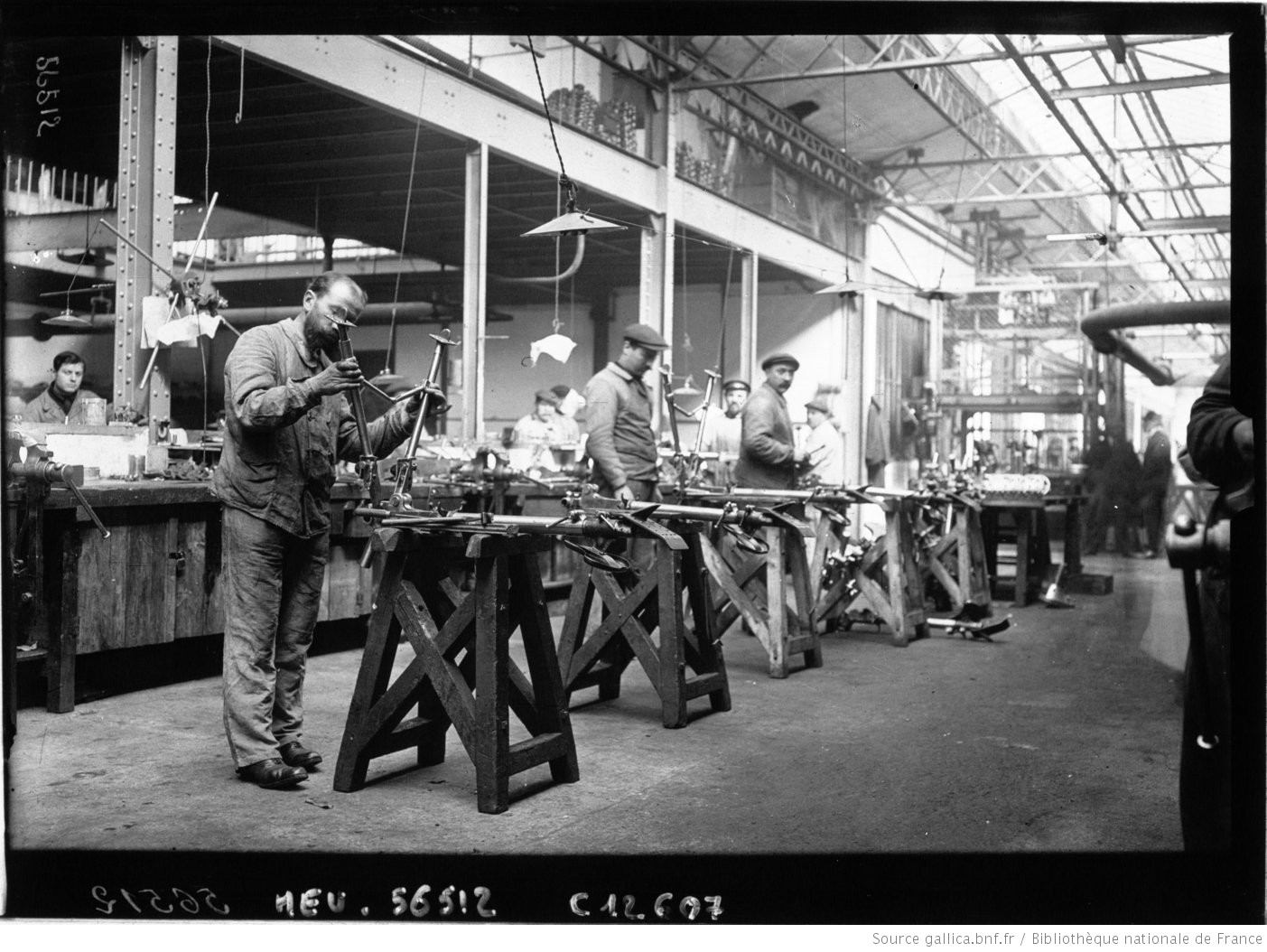
Manufacturing of machine guns at the Darracq factory in Suresnes.

From the end of March 1915, Zeppelin raids converged on Paris, the fort's defenses preventing them from bombing the factories in Suresnes and Puteaux. Suresnes nevertheless experienced several evenings when all the lights were switched off and its inhabitants waited in cellars. As trench warfare begins, many skilled workers are recalled from the front to keep the factories running and supply the army with munitions. The municipality distributed 30,000 liters of milk to the "Goutte de lait" charity, and 110 children were sent to summer camps in Châtillon-sur-Seine, Carnoy, Saint-Firmin, Ousson, and Saint-Brisson. With the war expected to drag on, the hospital was moved to 74 rue du Mont-Valérien, which the town hall had just bought, to free up the Jean-Macé school for pupils. During the first year of the war, the hospital cared for 350 patients. In 1916, the commune renamed one of its quays after General Joseph Gallieni and Rue de Neuilly Rue de Verdun, in tribute to the famous battle.

The Blériot and Blum-Latil companies requested the purchase of city-owned land in rue de Longchamp, Frédéric-Clavel, and Chardin to expand their factories, a request the city council granted after an initial refusal. Blériot and Farman also put their know-how at the service of the country, to equip it with a military aviation system at a time when the German Reich had a certain lead: 13,000 SPAD-Herbemont aircraft were produced by Blériot's factories. With coal in short supply due to the German occupation of the coalfields, the gas company is forced to reduce its supplies. The town council also opened a 20,000-franc credit line to buy foodstuffs at low prices. At the end of 1917, the prefect also offered several thousand kilos of beans and lentils. At the end of 1916, however, the municipality had to introduce ration cards, first for sugar, then for bread and coal. The people of Suresnes had to go without meat for two days a week. A stock of coal collected by the town hall enabled it to be distributed to certain households, in exchange for individual cards issued by the authorities. In November 1917, the prefect wrote to the mayor, urging him to save firewood.

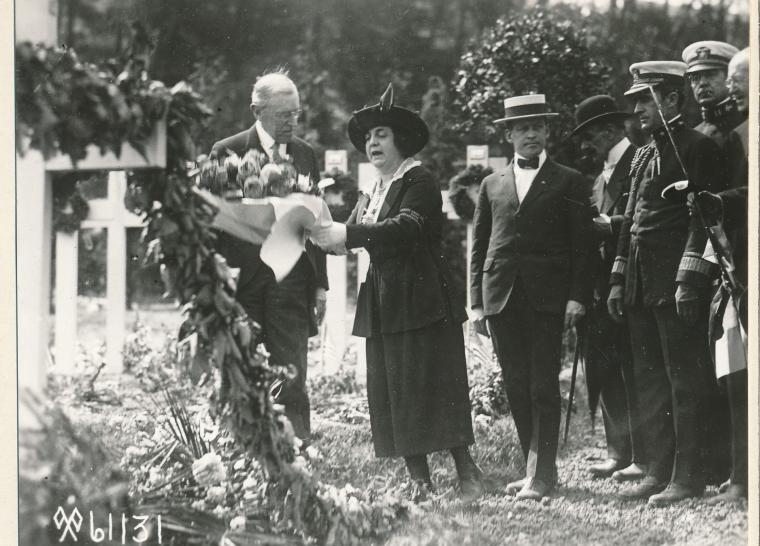
U.S. President Woodrow Wilson and First Lady Edith Wilson dedicating the American Cemetery.

In 1917, the United States entered the war. On September 28, the prefecture informed the mayor that the American authorities were looking for land west of Paris to create a cemetery for their fallen soldiers. The municipality offered them 3,600 m2 of the Tertre and Terres blanches communal property free of charge "for the burial of American soldiers who died for France". On June 29, 1918, the cemetery's surface area was increased to 8,300 m2, and on March 14, 1919, to 12,497 m2. On May 30, 1919, the cemetery was officially inaugurated in the presence of U.S. President Woodrow Wilson, General Pershing, and Marshal Foch. A chapel with a peristyle of Doric columns was added in 1931-1932, designed by William and Geoffroy Plath. On either side of the central building, two pavilions are dedicated to each of the world wars. A mosaic fresco by Barry Faulkner, entitled La Paix, is preserved here. The cemetery contains the graves of 1,541 soldiers from the Great War and 24 from the Second World War. Bodies are buried vertically to save space. Every year on Memorial Day (May 30), a ceremony is held here in the presence of French and American authorities.

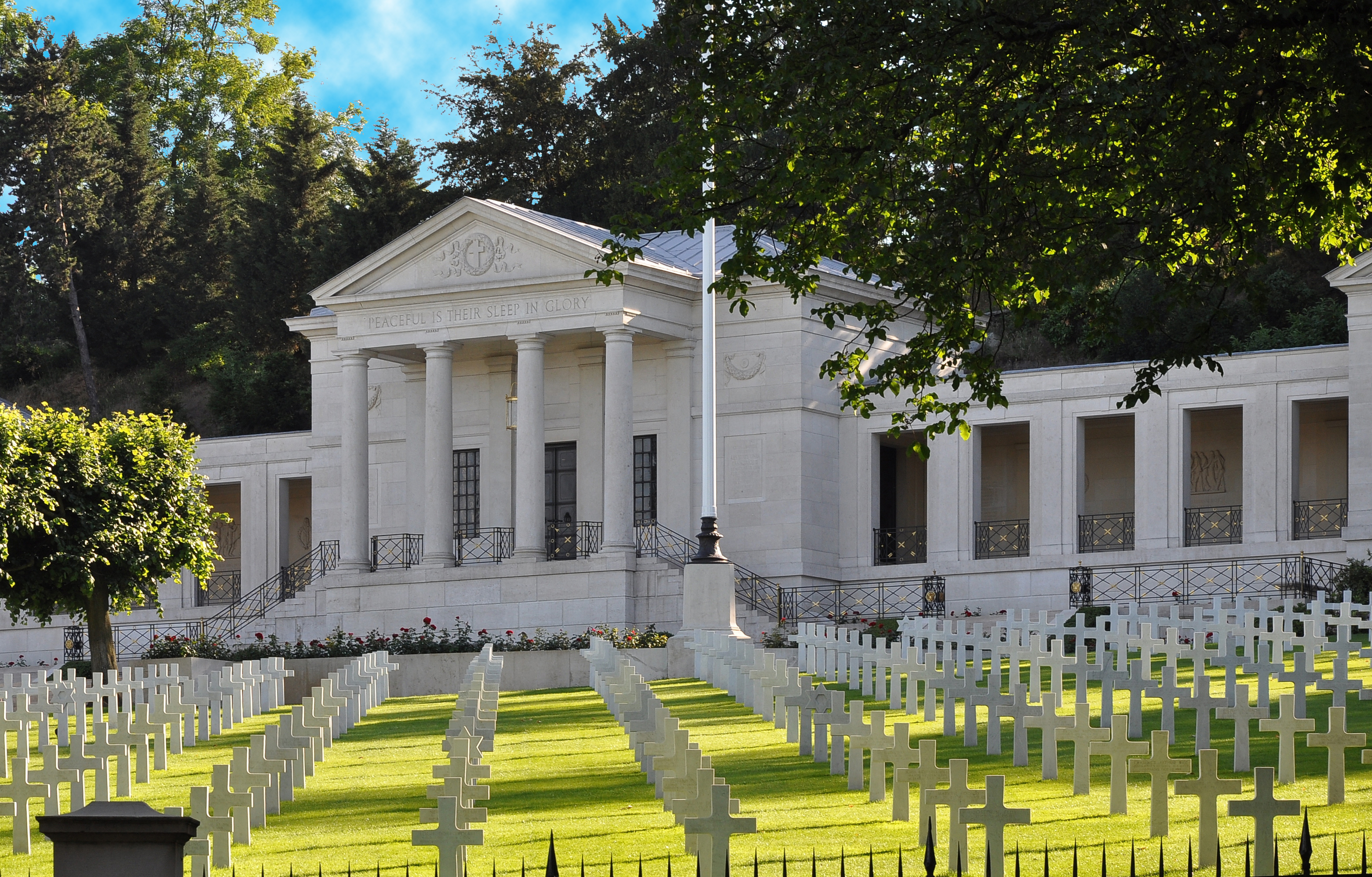
View of the cemetery, with the chapel erected in the early 1930s.

Faced with the development of aviation, and therefore the risk of bombing, a commission comprising a town councilor, three property owners, two contractors, a fire brigade non-commissioned officer, and a brigadier from the police station was set up on February 9, 1918, to search for "buildings, cellars, basements, and other places suitable for use as shelters". Eighty buildings were selected to accommodate 4,420 people, but this was still not enough, prompting the mayor to seek authorization from the railway company to use the tunnel on the Moulineaux line (also mobilized as a shelter in 1940). While the basements of the Jean-Macé school were large and solid enough to shelter all its pupils, those from other schools had to find other shelters. On April 28, 1918, it was decided to install a siren in the bell tower of the town hall to warn Suresnois of any danger. The siren was useless, however, as no bombs hit the town.

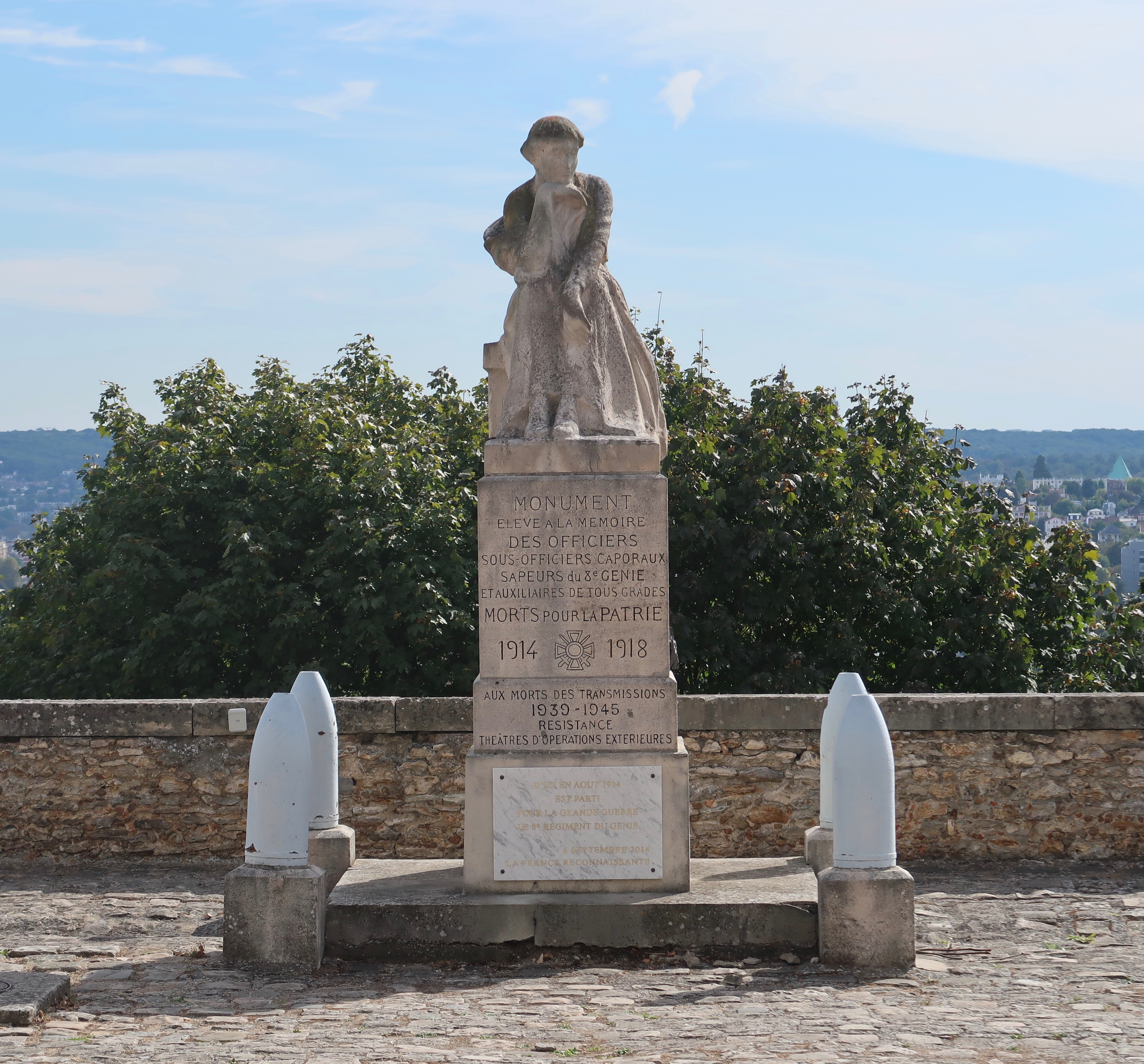
Monument to the dead of the First World War in the fort. There is also a military square of soldiers in the Voltaire cemetery.

The armistice of November 11, 1918, is celebrated with joy. Suresnes historian Octave Seron recounts: "What joy, what celebration, what excitement! At eleven o'clock, after 1,561 days of war, the news spread that the armistice had been signed, that it was all over... instantly, workers poured out of factories, women out of workshops, employees out of offices, pupils out of schools, and crowds of people took to the streets in a frenzy of joy, embracing, singing and dancing — an unforgettable spectacle. Anyone who has not lived through those hours, who has not seen, as we did, the boulevards on the evening of November 11th, is unaware of the explosion of joy of an entire people freed from a bloody nightmare of four years, and intoxicated by the legitimate pride of victory". 523 Suresnois died in the war, their names inscribed on a monument in the Voltaire cemetery. A memorial has also been erected in the fortress. After the end of the war, the town welcomed many troops awaiting demobilization, including the 2nd Battalion of the 101st Infantry Regiment, whose men were housed in uninhabited houses on Rue du Mont-Valérien, and the infirmary of the 14th Infantry Battalion, in the basement of the salle des fêtes. On July 13, 1919, soldiers still in Suresnes for the following day's parade presented their flags to the municipality. On August 4, 1919, a 77 mm cannon was awarded to Suresnes as a “war prize and trophy,” although René Sordes did not know what had become of it, or even if it had been received. On July 29, 1919, Suresnes decided to allocate 100,000 francs to Brancourt-le-Grand (Aisne), which had been devastated by the war, and appointed six delegates to study the commune's needs.

In June 1919, Mayor Victor Diederich was accused of having, during the war, obtained permission from the Schwob brothers to store coal in the former Meunier factory in exchange for 3,000 kg of fuel for the owner, even though the municipal council had not been consulted. This did not cause a scandal, but the mayor was blamed nonetheless. The municipal employees then went on strike, and on September 12, the mayor had a 14-article statute adopted. On November 21, he presided over his last council meeting, boasting of the town's prosperous finances and asserting that he had “always wanted to do his duty and to have always looked after the interests of the commune.”

== The Seine at Suresnes ==
=== The Seine ===
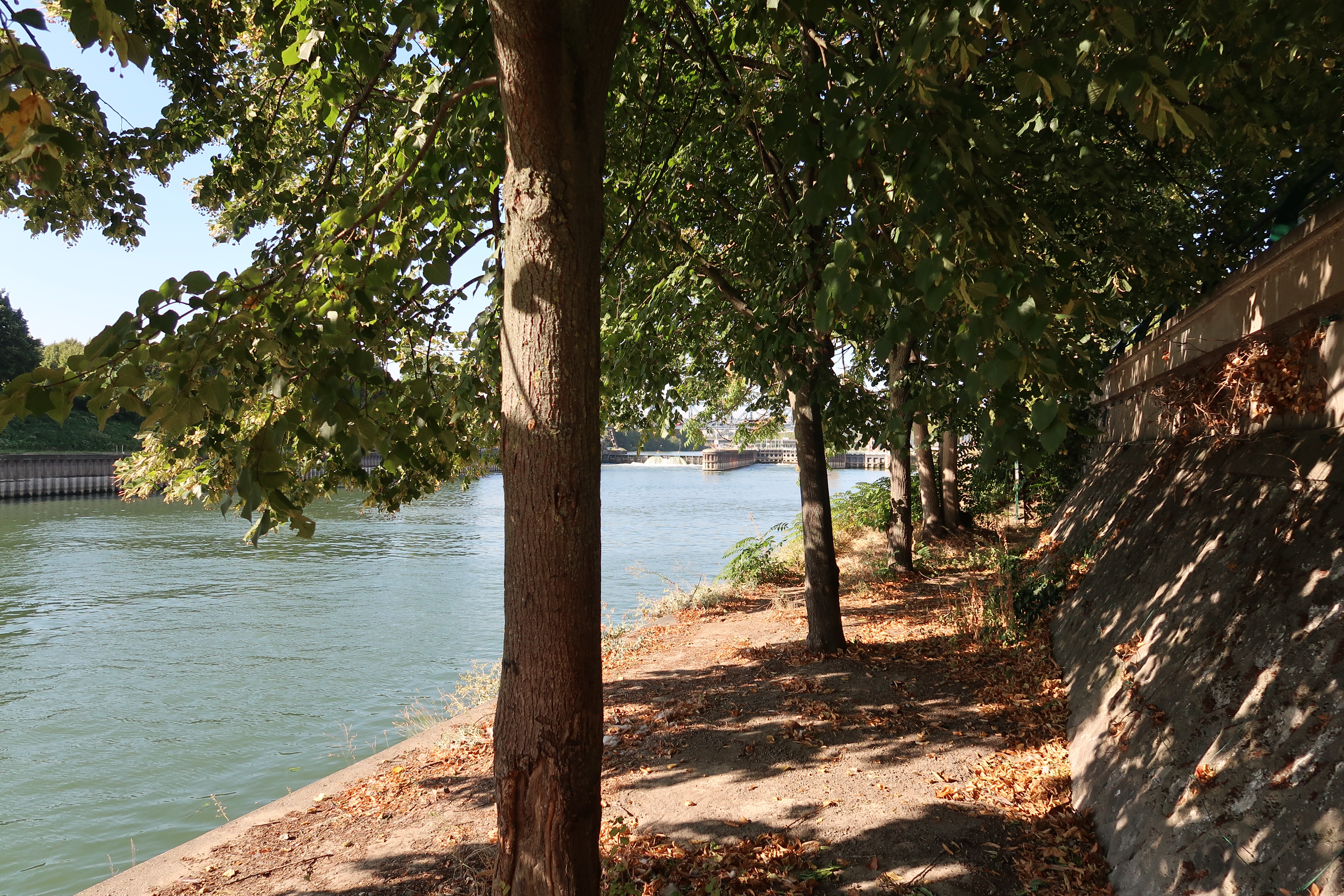
Suresnes quay, with the dam in the background.

Until the French Revolution, while Suresnes was part of the territory of the Abbey of Saint-Germain-des-Prés, the stretch of the Seine in front of the village belonged to the Abbey of Saint-Denis, known as the “prévôté de la Cuisine” (because its revenues were used to cover the monks' kitchen expenses). Properties, wharves, and boats on the islands paid fees to the provost. After the Revolution, the Seine became part of Paris to the east (Bois de Boulogne) and Suresnes to the west. In 1669, Saint-Denis surveyor Claude Lescuyer surveyed the islets in the Seine opposite Suresnes. He mentioned the existence of three islands that had now disappeared: l'île au Mair (or Mer), l'île de Suresnes (or du Bac), and Le Motteau (or Javeau de Suresnes), which lined the right bank of the river and had been given by the abbot of Saint-Denis to the bishop of Paris, who then ceded them to the abbey of Saint-Germain. As time went by, however, they were eventually welded to the neighboring riverbank. Île au Mair, 50 hectares in size, was located at the level of the Longchamp Racecourse, began to the south by a road leading to Boulogne, and ended at the Seine with a watering hole; an arm of the river separated it from the bank, and a ditch from the neighboring island to the north, Île de Suresnes. The latter also had a moat to the east. The ferryman's house and pier were located there, as was the Brisemiche fountain. (Note: Who was still in the Bois de Boulogne campsite in the 1960s.) The island covered 10 hectares, of which a farmer cultivated 12 arpents. Finally, Le Motteau was a small island located between the first two, measuring 2 arpents and 16 perches. René Sordes hypothesizes that the lakes and rivers to the west of the Bois de Boulogne are the heirs to these ancient ditches between the islands.

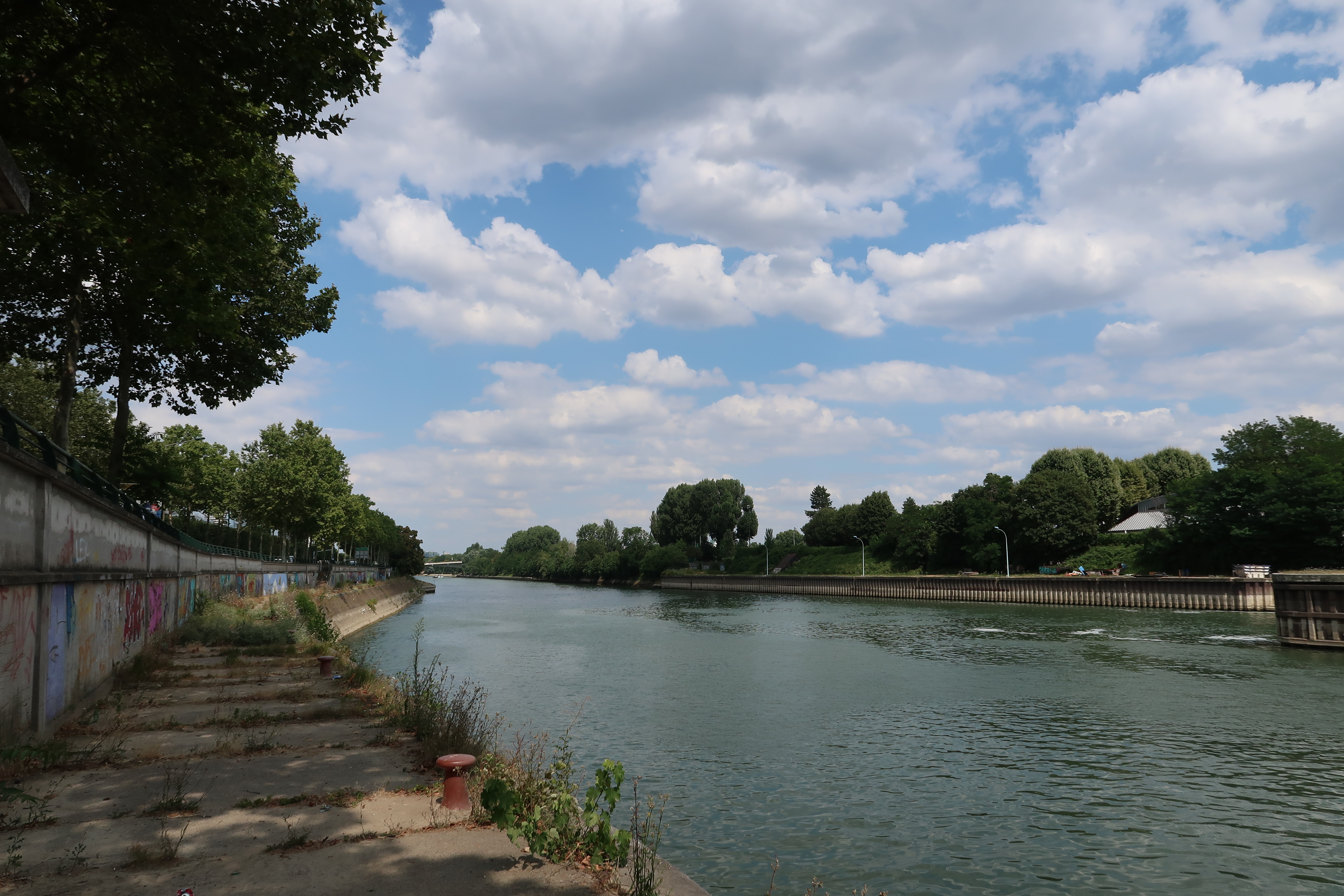
Quai de Suresnes, with the Île de Puteaux on the right, where the municipality owned land for a long period of the Ancien Régime.

A map of the Seine made by Father Jean Delagrive, the king's geographer, in 1731 mentions the existence of two bassiers, “river bottoms raised by sand and stones”: the Marinet (from the Saint-Cloud bridge to the Avre aqueduct) and the Muret (at the southernmost tip of the Ile de Puteaux). When the water level was low, the herds of Suresnes could cross over the bassiers, making the Seine fordable, to reach the island's pastures.

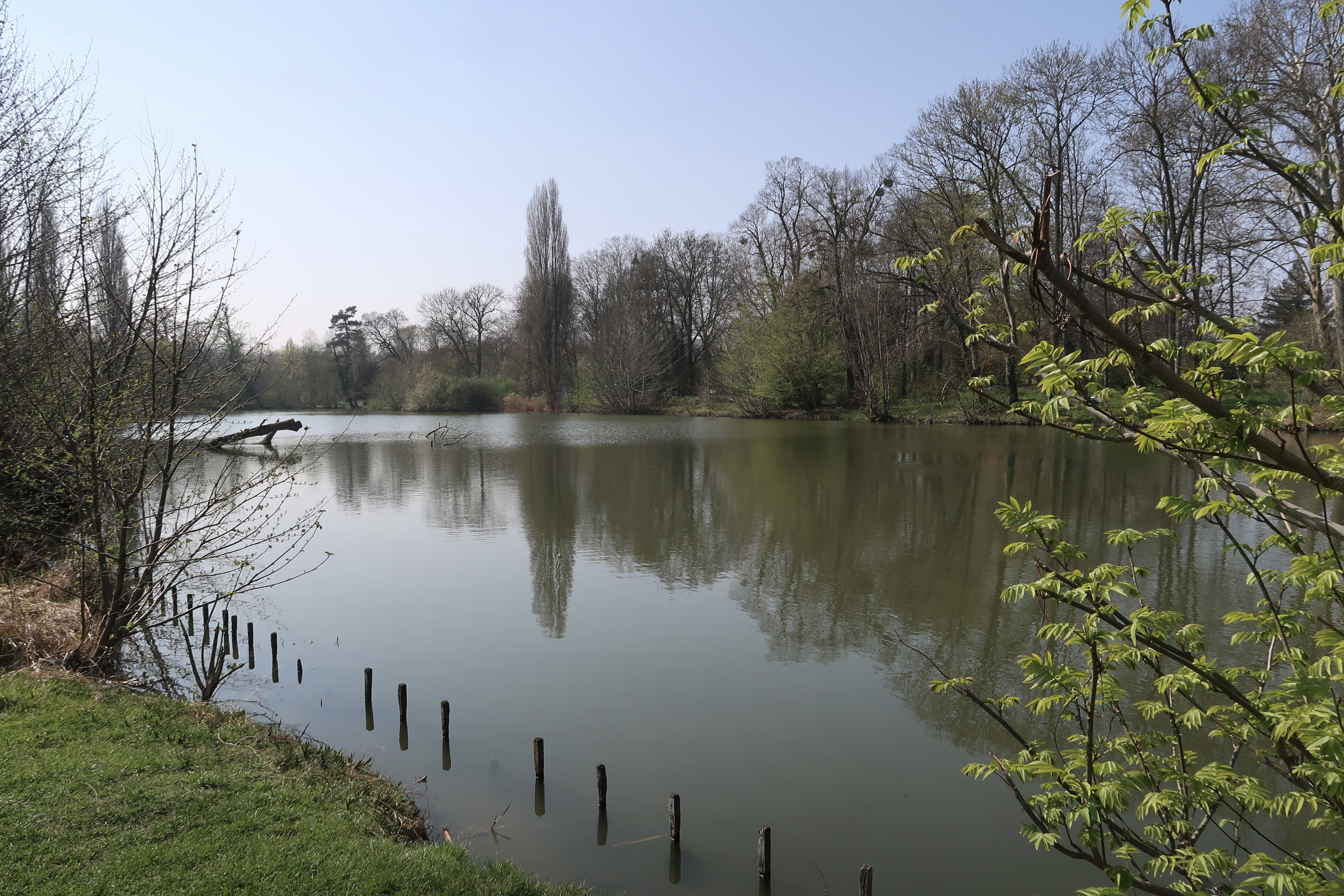
The Suresnes pond, in the Bois de Boulogne, possible survival of the location of an island between Suresnes and the woods.

A trade route since Antiquity, the Seine brought in several types of income. Fishing was done with fixed installations (gords) or on the water (lines, nets, nasses), with many Suresnois using this second method. In 1646, there were six gords on the Val d'Or descent. There were professional fishermen in Suresnes until 1870, supplying the “guinguettes” for their fried fish and the markets of Suresnes, Puteaux, and Saint-Cloud. In September 1805, the gords were destroyed. At a time when shipwrecks were frequent due to the river's overflowing waters, the people of Suresnes were also able to benefit from the wrecks.

In the past, boats on the Seine were generally small and flat-bottomed, pulled by horses along towpaths. In Suresnes, they stopped at the "Port aux Vins" at the end of the eponymous street, carrying barrels of wine to the capital. Boats also stopped on the banks of the Val d'Or to drop off sheep from Paris or Champagne, which were then taken to the pastures on the hillsides around La Fouilleuse. The inhabitants of Suresnes could also see boats coming down the Seine carrying trees cut down in the forests of the Yonne and Côte-d'Or regions.

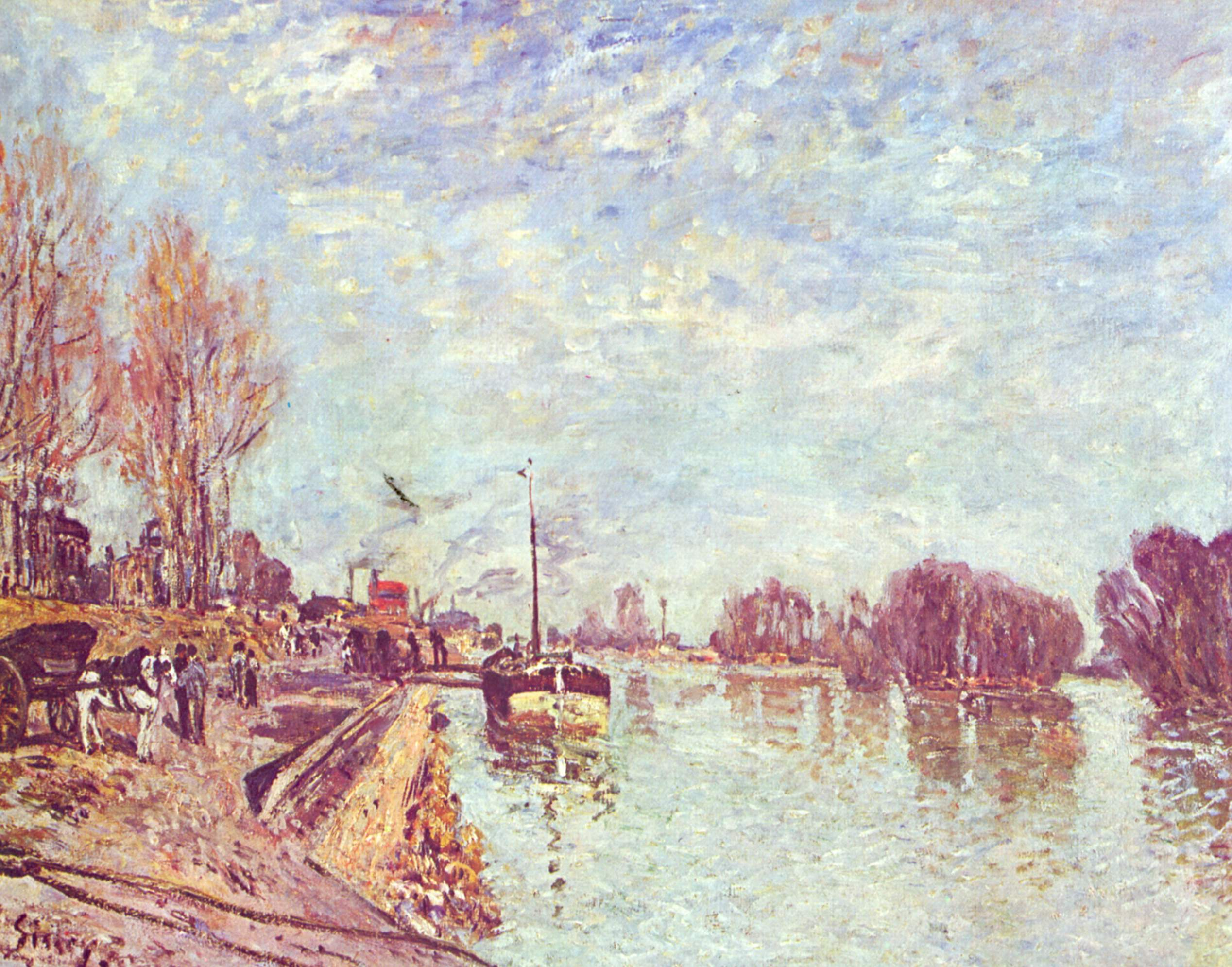
The Seine at Suresnes by Alfred Sisley (1879).

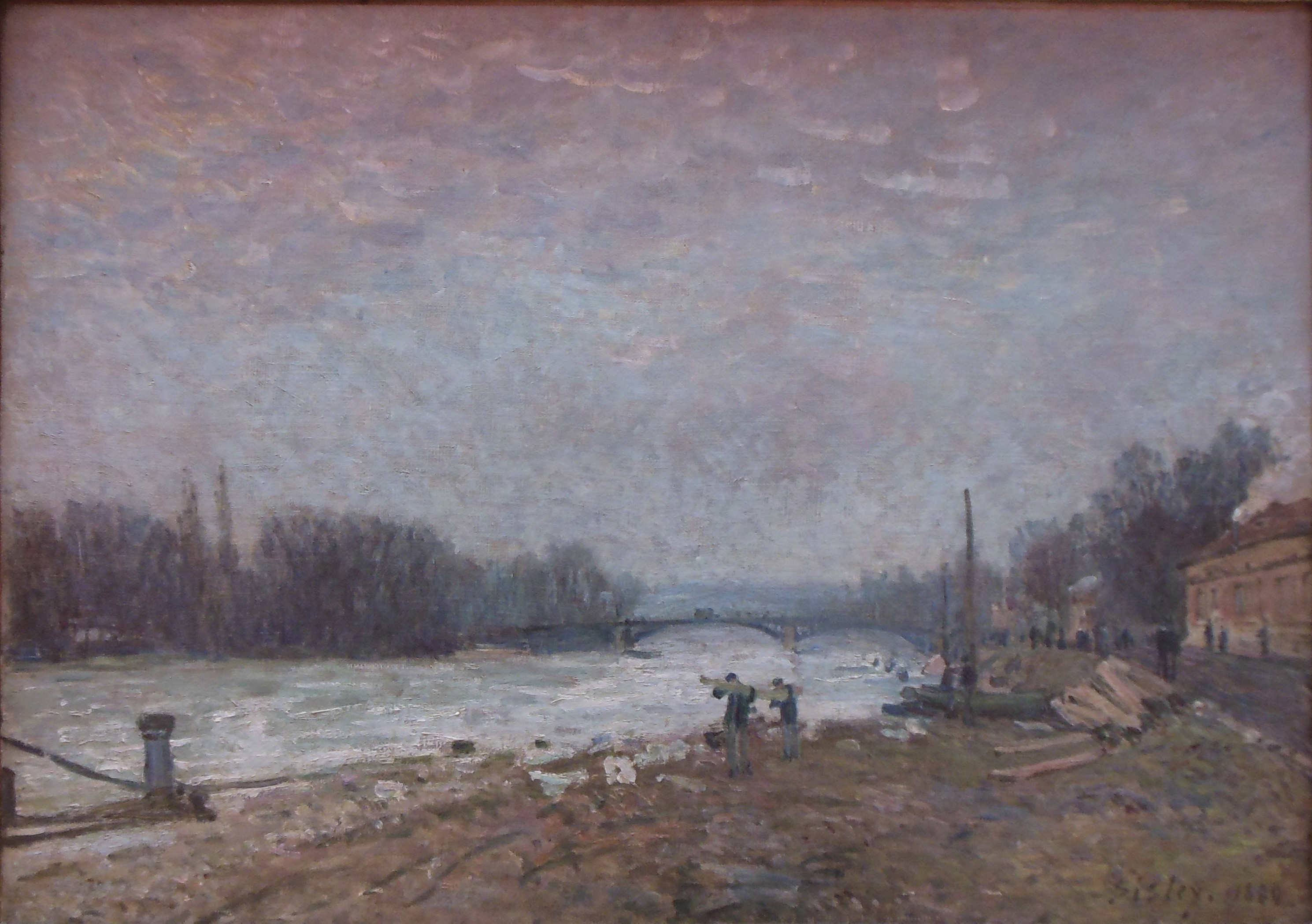
After the Debacle, the Seine at the Suresnes Bridge by Alfred Sisley (1880).

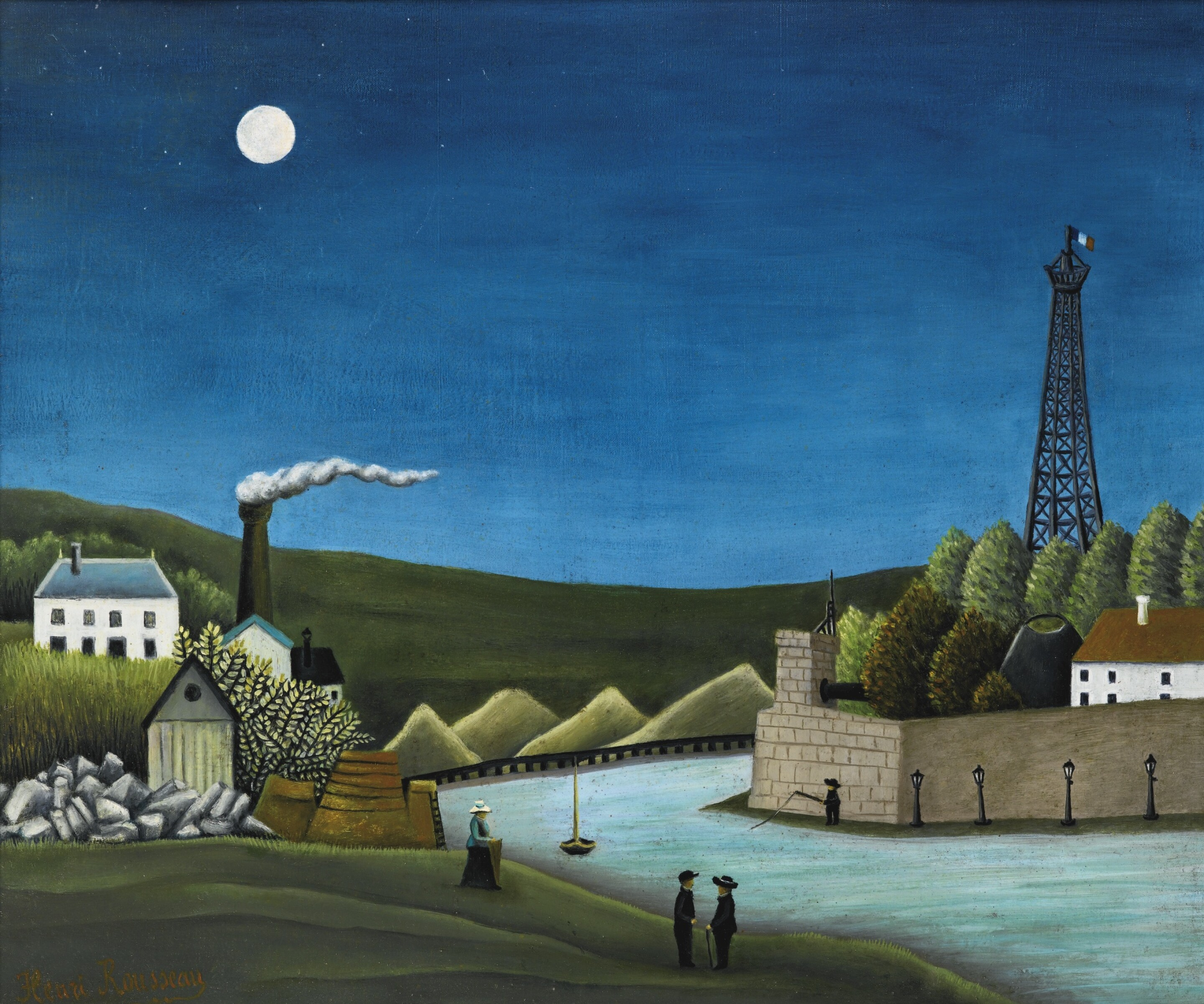
The Seine at Suresnes by Henri Rousseau.

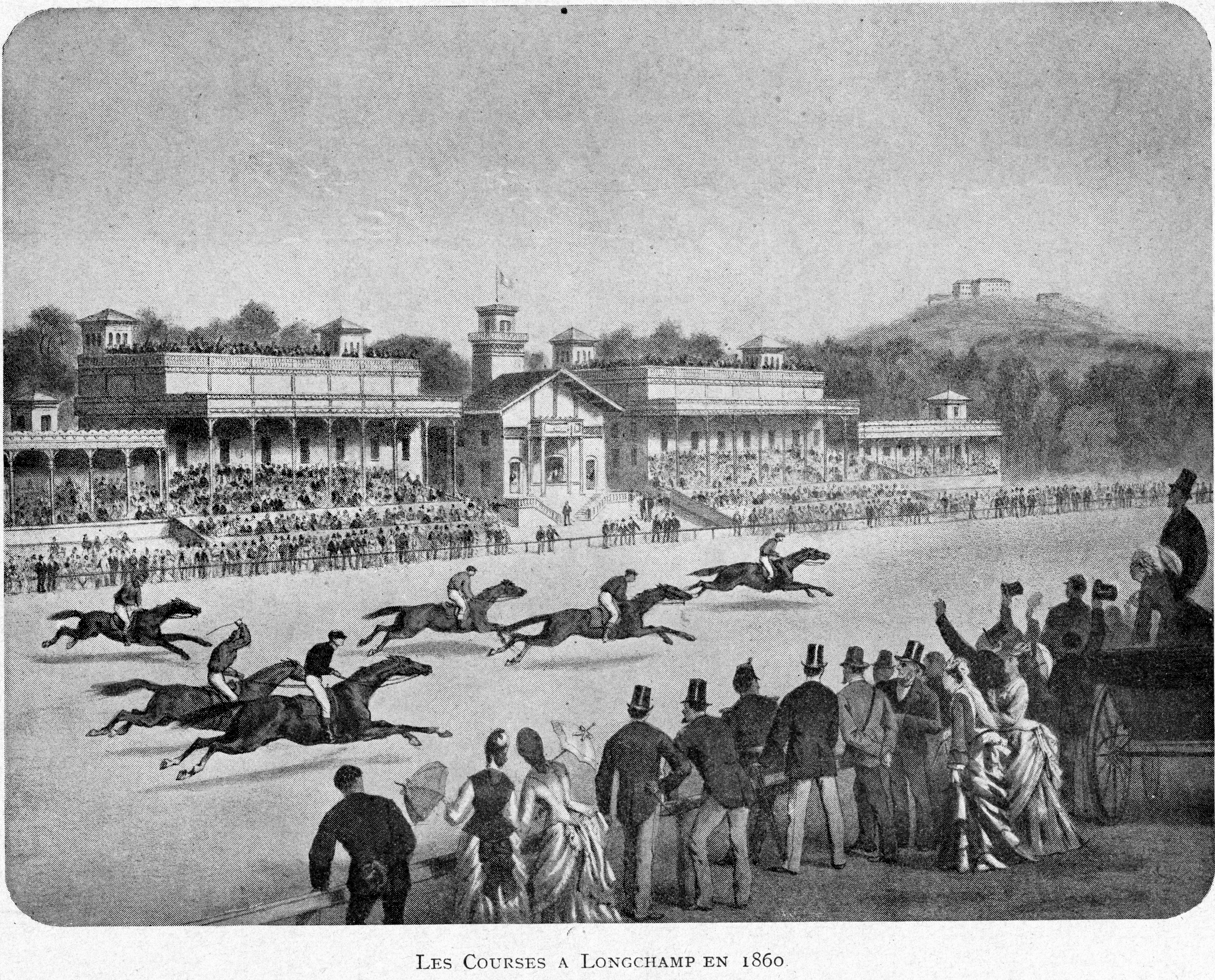
The races at Longchamp (engraving from 1860, with Mont Valérien at the top right) attract many Parisians on Sundays, who then quench their thirst in the guinguettes of Suresnes.

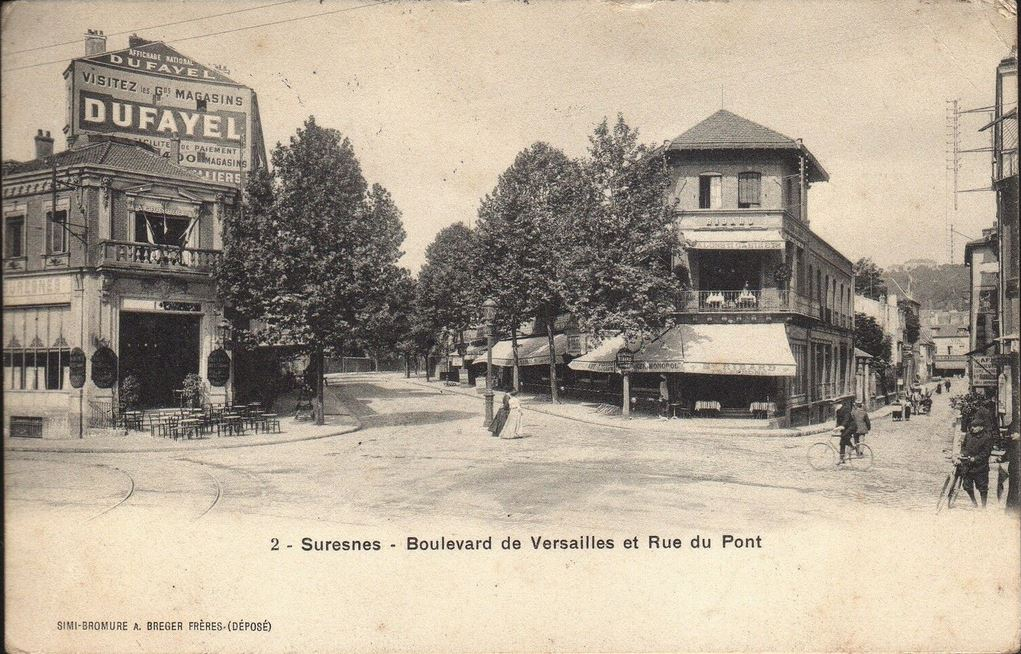
Postcard showing Rue du Pont, which has disappeared today, replaced by a shopping center.

From the 19th to the early 20th century, strollers, turfers, and lovers of guinguettes flocked to Suresnes. The most important were located along the quays: “Le Moulin Rose” (with a mill on the front and a ballroom that welcomed turfers and newlyweds), (Note: Maurice Chevalier and Édith Piaf made their debuts there.) “Le Pavillon de Suresnes,” “Le Chalet du Cycle” (with an attraction, a small cable car running above the gardens, between two turrets) and finally “À la Belle Gabrielle,” created in 1861 and described as follows by the historical and commercial directory of Suresnes at the time: “Great restaurateur, magnificent gardens, groves, pavilions, chalets overlooking the banks of the Seine, luxury cuisine, exceptional value for money, fine wines, billiards, private pavilions for banquets and weddings.” Rue du Pont also boasts one of the largest concentrations of restaurants in the whole of western Paris. Since the construction of the first dam, boat omnibuses have been making the journey to Paris easier.

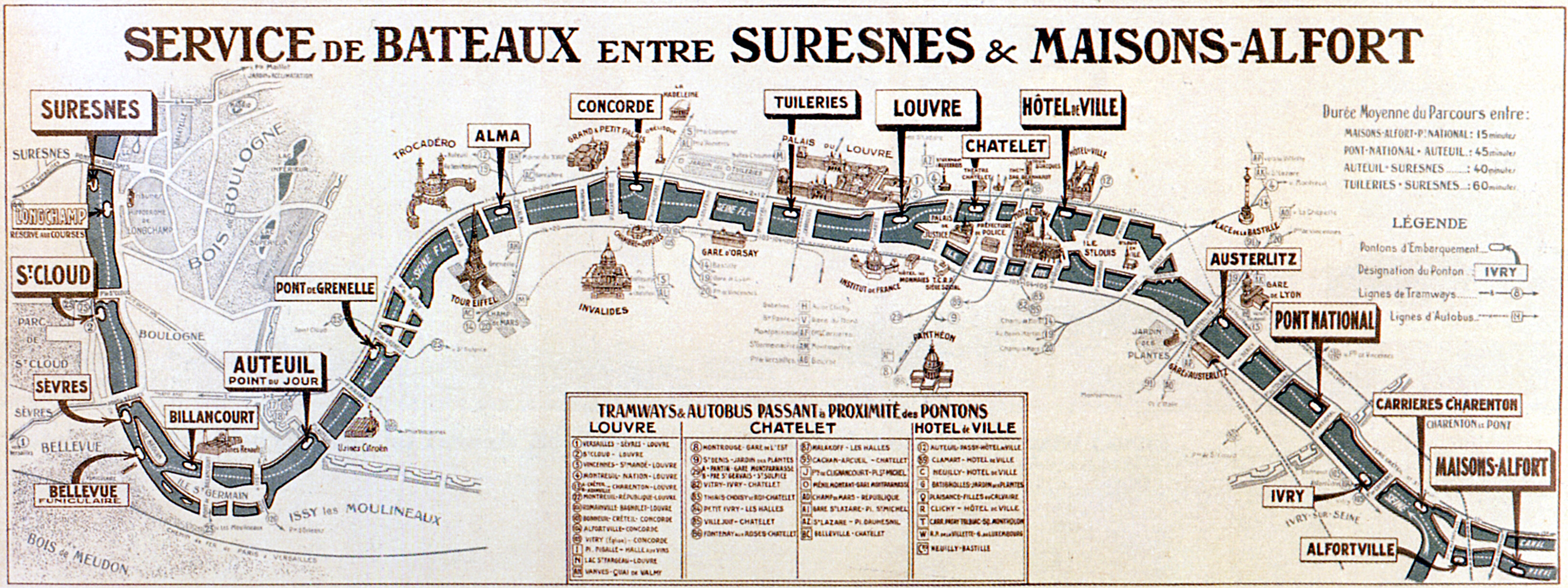
Plan of the boat service between Suresnes and Maisons-Alfort (around 1900).

While the first company, founded in 1866, only crossed Paris, from the Pont National to the Auteuil viaduct, a second, the Compagnie des Hirondelles-Parisiennes, entrusted to Courtin, established a service from Charenton to Suresnes. A third was created in 1885 to cross the Marne. The three companies subsequently merged to form the Compagnie Générale des Bateaux Parisiens. Measuring 30 to 33 meters, these boats could carry 225 to 300 people. Benches were spread across the deck, and a cabin accessible via a staircase in the middle provided shelter from the rain, while a beach at the stern lined with a semicircular tub was accessible via a double staircase. Boats disembarked at Suresnes downstream from the bridge, on a flat-bottomed steel pontoon with a wooden floor, 15 meters long and 5 meters wide. A bell signaled departures and arrivals every hour, from around 7 a.m. to 7 p.m. Traffic diminished as electric traction developed, while the weather sometimes interrupted navigation (fog, floods, frost, etc.).

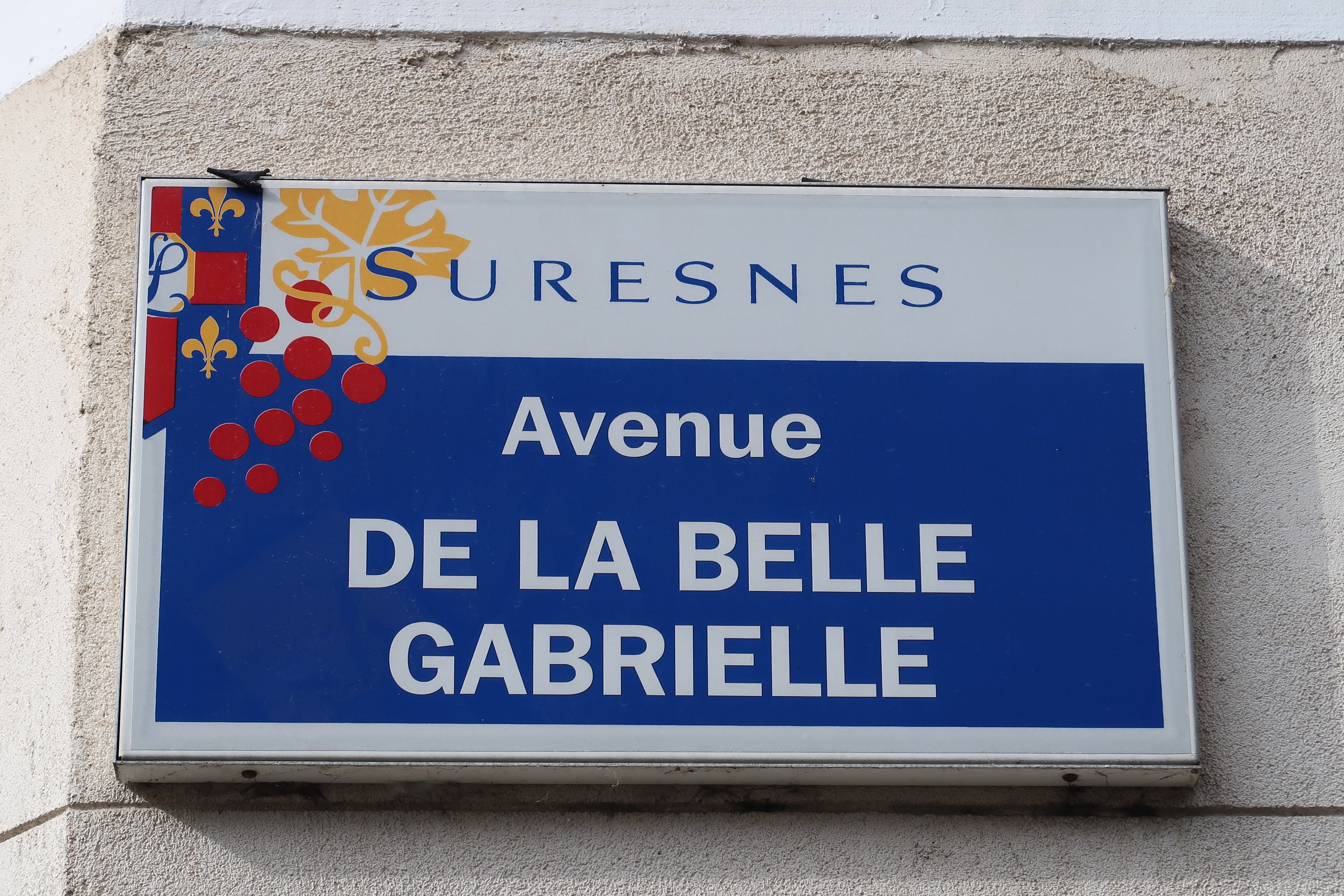
Plaque on Avenue de la Belle-Gabrielle, in the district where the former eponymous guinguette was located.

From 27 million in 1899, traffic fell to 16 million in 1913, as the company put itself on standby for the outbreak of war. With the war over, the company sold its equipment to the STCRP, but customers were few and far between, except in fine weather. The bateaux-mouches disappeared in 1933 (due to the tramway's traffic growth) and the equipment was sold in 1935, to the great displeasure of the cafés, guinguettes, and restaurants around the bridge, which lost some of their clientele. Until the Great War, there was also a small port downstream from the pier, with 59,100 tons of movement in 1899 (58,900 inbound, 202 outbound), to supply coal to the Suresnes dye works, as well as coal, sand, millstone, firewood, cast iron, and wine. It disappeared, like the port-aux-vins and port-aux-moutons before it. The port of Suresnes was also home to boats belonging to the Touring Club de France yacht club.

=== Crossing the Seine ===
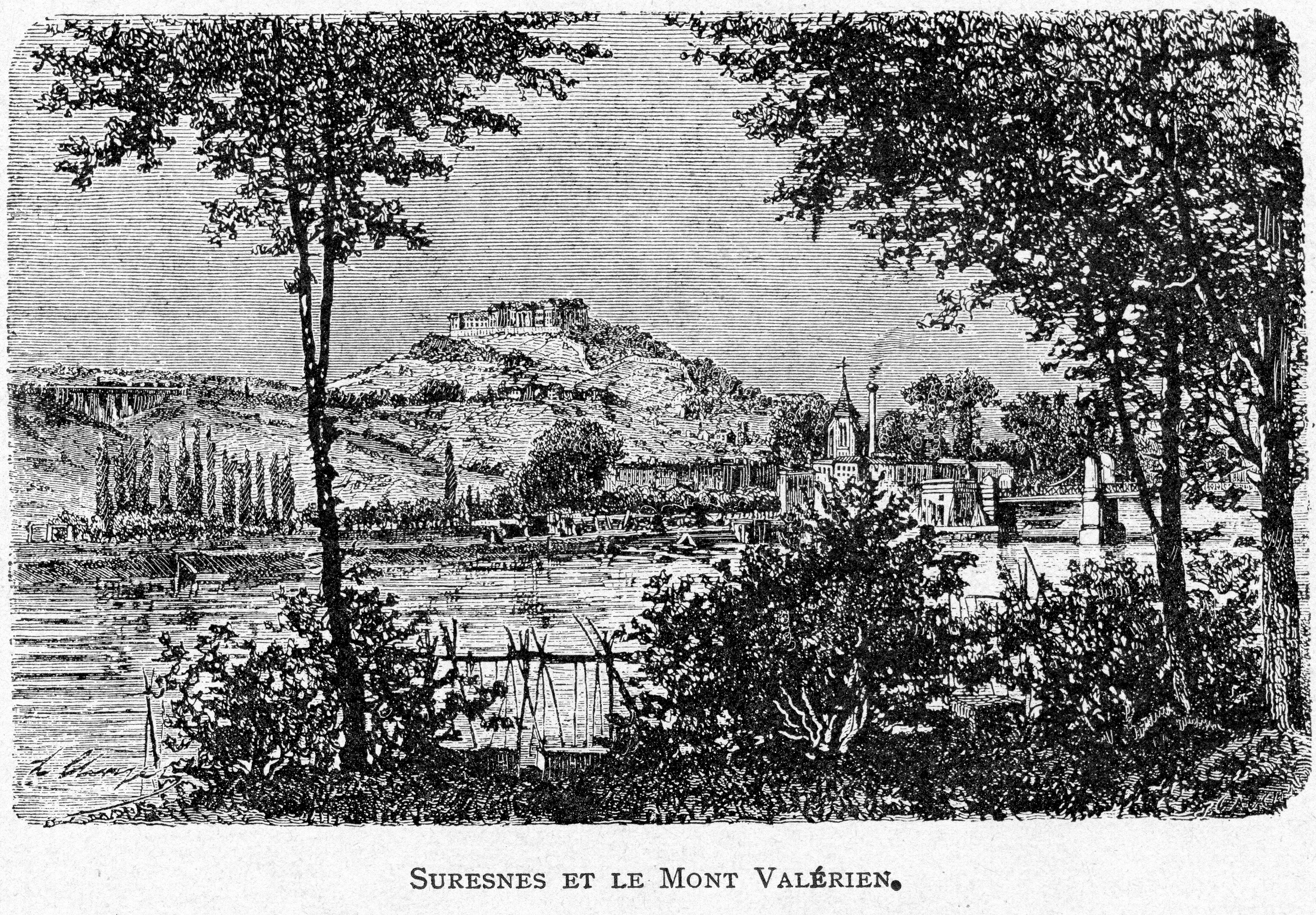
Engraving depicting Suresnes and Mont Valérien seen from the other bank of the Seine, with the suspension bridge on the right. The village still had a rural character at that time.

Until the bridge was built, the only way to cross the Seine at Suresnes was by ferry, as the bridges at Saint-Cloud and Neuilly were quite far away. The origins of the ferry are unknown, but the earliest document mentioning it dates to 1590. Until the Revolution, the ferrymen belonged to a community of "corps de maître", controlled by the Provost of Merchants and Aldermen of Paris. They earned their income from the fields they cultivated in parallel, and above all from rights of passage, particularly for pilgrims on their way to Mont Valérien. Men, horses, animals, and carriages could cross the Seine in this way. It disappeared in 1837, replaced shortly afterward by the suspension bridge, as its operation had become unprofitable due to the disappearance of the Calvaire pilgrimage.

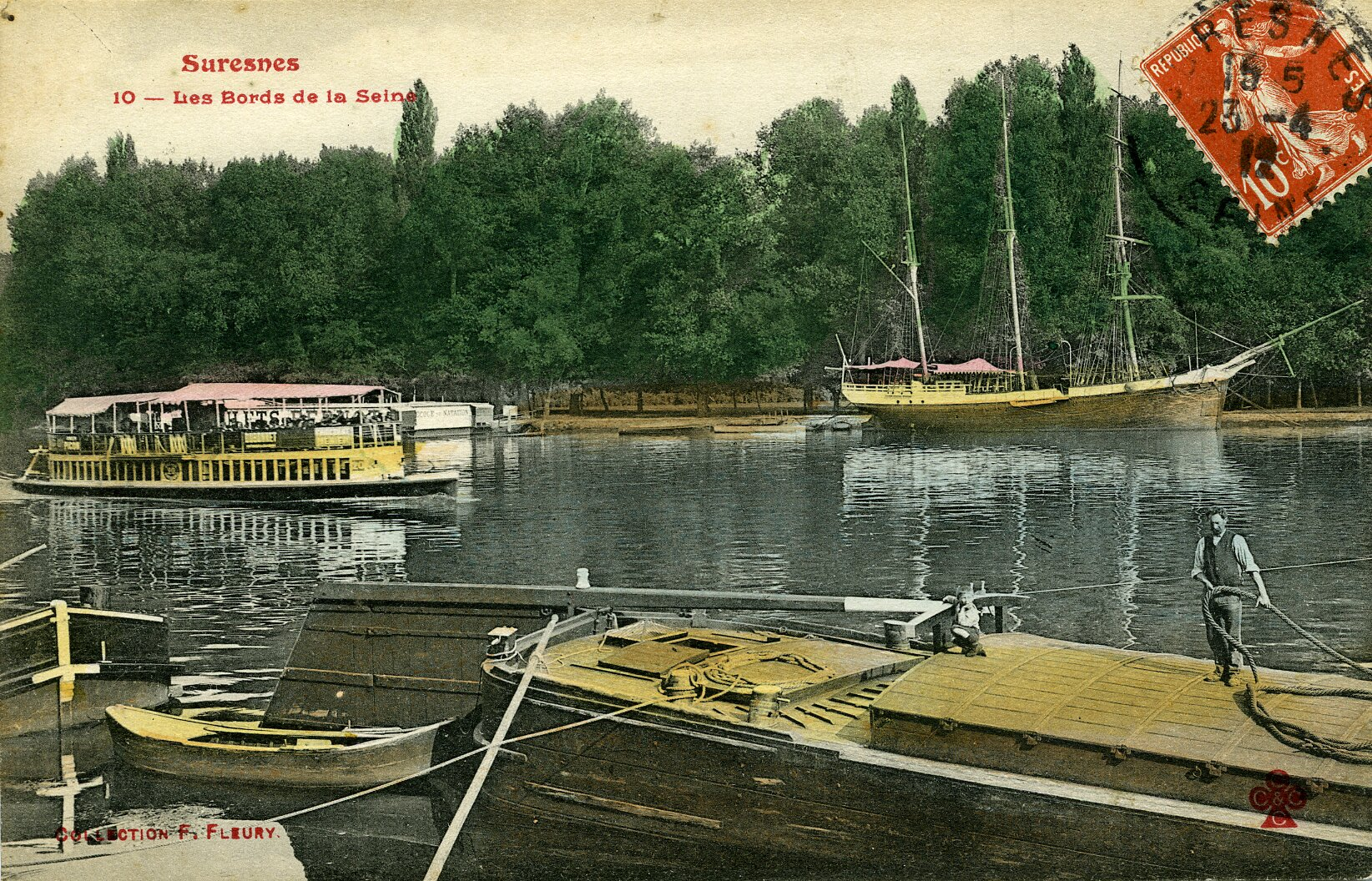
Boats on the Seine at Suresnes, in 1912.

After the first aborted project in 1829, a new study to build a suspension bridge was presented in 1837 by the Séguin brothers and approved by the Suresnes town council, which offered a subsidy of 20,000 francs. The bridge would be located at Rue de la Barre (later Rue du Pont), offset from the old ferry crossing (which ended at Rue du Bac). Work, costing 355,000 francs, was completed in August 1841, and the bridge was inaugurated in April 1842 in the presence of a musical band from the 39th Infantry Regiment, the municipality, and the clergy, the bridge being decorated with tricolor flags for the occasion. The bridge is 7 meters wide, with two one-meter sidewalks and three spans. Supported by two pillars, it is suspended by "a bundle of soft iron ribbons". Featuring rivets, it was considered very modern at the time. There is a toll, except for official agents. However, tolls sometimes gave rise to conflicts, as did the lack of clearance at Rue de la Barre. In September 1870, as the Prussians entered Paris, a fire broke out on the bridge: an alert later proved false, which had warned of the arrival of Uhlans. The people of Suresne piled furniture from nearby restaurants in front of the bridge and set it alight. In reality, it was a French general and his staff. Official documents, however, mention another version of the story, according to which the destruction of the bridge was decided by the general staff, as with all those providing access to Paris. The abutment on the right bank of the bridge was destroyed by an explosive charge laid by the engineers.

Once the armistice was signed, German pontoon boat operators built a boat bridge in its place, through which Kaiser Wilhelm passed in 1871 on his way from Versailles. The bridge was removed after the Germans left, leaving Suresnes isolated. As the Versailles government prepared to suppress the Commune, a new boat bridge was built by artillery and engineers. Later, the Pont de Bateaux was again removed and reinstalled with a guardrail, supervised by an engineering post paid for by the Paris municipality.

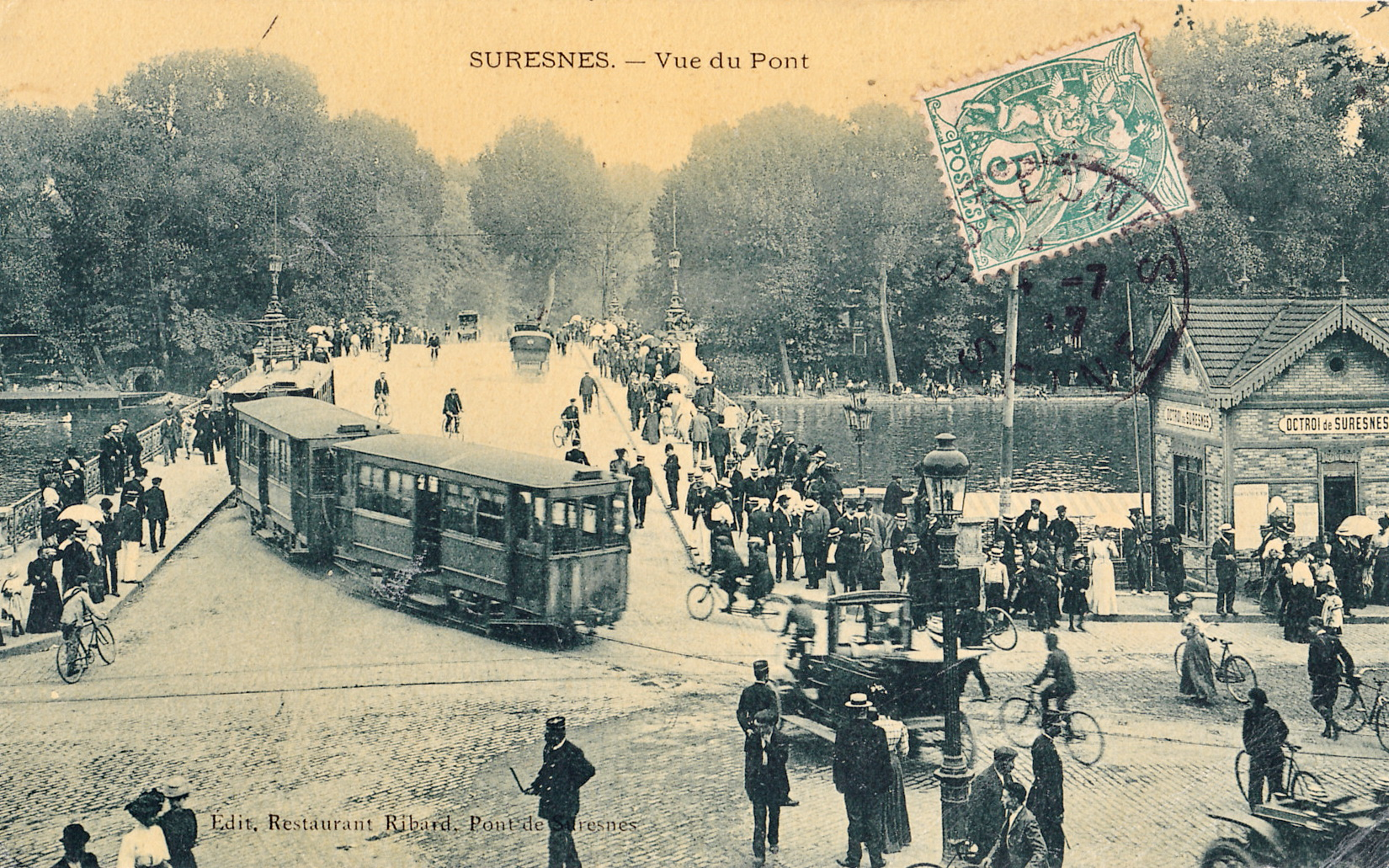
The 1871 bridge, with one of the toll offices on the right and the Bois de Boulogne railway in the center.

On July 31, 1871, a bailiff found that the suspension bridge could not be repaired. The authorities decided to build an iron bridge on its site, like the one at Courbevoie. The Suresnes municipal council approved the project on February 20, 1872, voting to borrow 100,000 francs. Engineer Legrand was in charge of the design, and work began between April 1873 and August 1874. It comprises three arches, two 44-metre-long at either end and one 33-metre-long in the middle. The bridge is supported by two fir-tree pillars held together by a concrete mass cast in a caisson. Clad in exposed stone from the Château-Landon quarries, the bridge has a 7.5-metre-wide carriageway bordered by two 1.75-metre sidewalks. It was opened to traffic in November 1874, marking the end of the boat bridge. However, the metal bridge soon proved to be too small, especially “on race and review days, the crowds are so great that people crash into it,” as General Councillor Feron observed. The construction of the Bois de Boulogne railroad, which runs through the area, added to the difficulties. For 360,000 francs, with Paris and Suresnes each contributing 50,000 francs, the road was widened between June 1897 and 1901, increasing the carriageway to 11 meters and the sidewalks to 3.275 meters. Crozel was entrusted with the works; the Mazières factories in Bourges with the steel structure; Jean-Camille Formigé with the studies for the bridge ornaments; and the sculptor Emmanuel Frémiet with the griffins decorating the candelabras. The entrance to the bridge from the Bois de Boulogne was also redesigned. However, the octroi station at the entrance gate caused numerous traffic jams, as motorists had to declare the fuel in their tanks and present green paper for inspection on entering and leaving Paris.

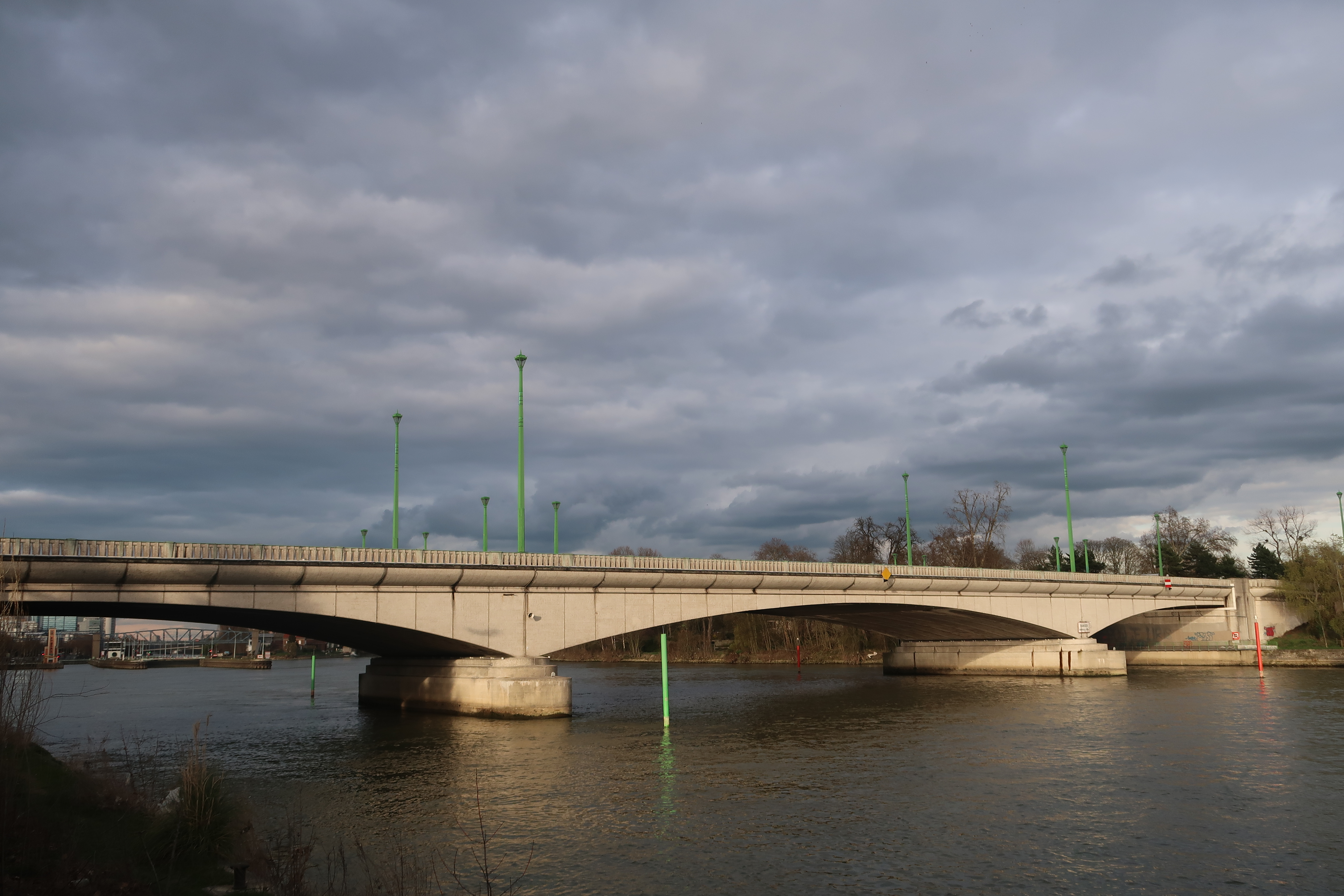
The 1951 bridge, whose construction was interrupted during the Second World War, allows the two bridges to coexist side by side.

Even when enlarged, the bridge was quickly criticized as dangerous for both traffic and navigation, with barges hitting its left pier at high water. In addition, traffic along the quay, perpendicular to the bridge, made it difficult for cars to reach the Boulevard de Versailles. In 1936, at the suggestion of Mayor Henri Sellier, the Seine General Council decided to divert the boulevard de Versailles and build a new bridge. The new bridge had to be located upstream of the one to be demolished, and the boulevard had to be aligned accordingly. The axis of the new bridge was also to connect with the road leading to Porte Maillot, at an angle of 8 degrees to the river. The bridge would now also overhang the Quai Gallieni, which would therefore be located underneath it, to ease traffic flow; access ramps would be provided to reach the Quai Gallieni. Construction began in 1938, was interrupted by the war, and was completed between 1947 and 1950. It was first carried out by Grands Travaux de Marseille and the Dayde company, then, after the Second World War, by Ponts et Chaussées engineers from the Seine department and the Billiard company. For the occasion, the entrance to the new bridge at Boulevard de Versailles, now Boulevard Henri-Sellier, was modified, with a triangle of buildings demolished to allow alignment. The inauguration took place on February 22, 1951, in the presence of the President of the Paris City Council, Pierre de Gaulle. The old bridge was demolished. The classic cantilever bridge is 160 meters long, divided into three spans (40, 80, and 40 meters), with a 20-meter carriageway and two 5-meter sidewalks. It is supported by two concrete piers and abutments of the same material. The departments of Paris and Suresnes bore expenses. This construction, says René Sordes, "wiped out the liveliest part of Suresnes, between Rue du Pont and the Coty factory", referring to the many guinguettes that populated the area. The project cost around 1,100 million francs.

=== Barrages and floodgates ===
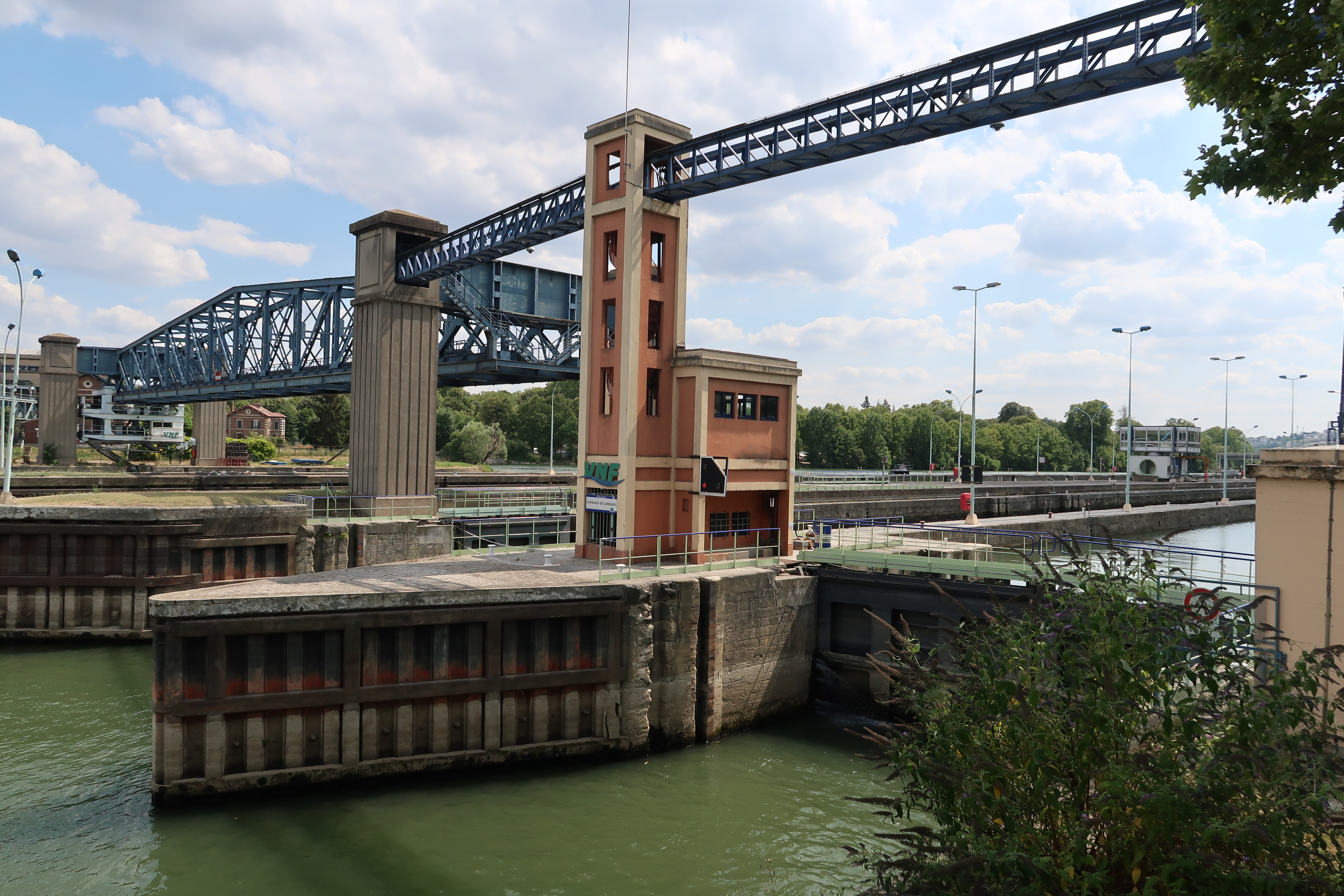
The interwar lock dam replaced that of the 1880s, which was considered insufficiently effective.

For a long time, the Seine was unnavigable for part of the year, in winter due to ice or flooding, and in summer due to drought. The construction of dams and locks ended this situation. In 1861, Prefect Haussmann issued an inquiry to construct a dam at Suresnes; the decree of December 11, 1864, ordered the construction of a lock and a fixed spillway, which was completed around 1869. The new structure raised the water level between Paris and Suresnes by 2 meters, thereby increasing barge traffic.

On April 6, 1878, a law was passed to carry out major works to improve navigation between Paris and Rouen. The lock was then doubled, with work taking place between 1880 and 1885.

Contemporary map.

After the flood of 1910, there was a growing awareness of the need to improve the flow of the Seine. A decree of May 30, 1926, confirmed by a law of July 27, 1927, provided for the construction of a new dam, more maneuverable and requiring less personnel. The work involved eliminating an arm of the Seine that ran alongside the Bois de Boulogne, which had then been a popular destination for anglers. All that remained were two arms of the river: between Île de la Folie and Île de Puteaux (the weir), and between the tip of Île de Puteaux and the lock (the navigable channel).

Replacing the late 19th-century dam, the new lock was built between 1930 and 1933. It includes a spillway topped by a footbridge, which allows a large amount of water to be discharged in the event of high water. It now has a four meters draught.

A new section was built in 1972. Today, the three dams and locks are fully automated, handling some 60 boats a day and 7 million tons of goods a year.

== Between the wars: Henri Sellier municipality ==
=== Elections ===
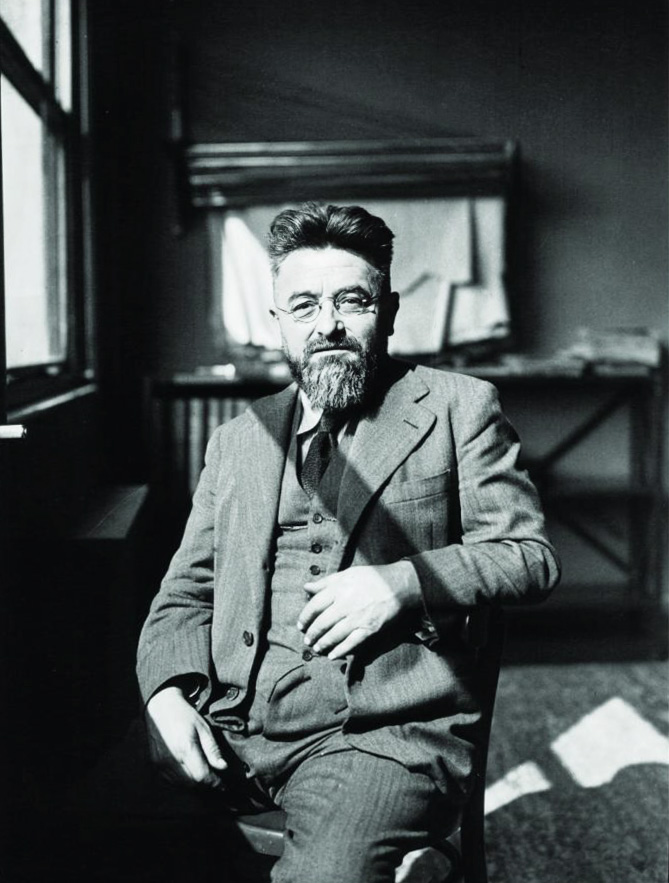
Henri Sellier, mayor from 1919 to 1941.

After the war, the “National Bloc” was formed in France, led by war veterans. In the municipal elections of November 1919, Henri Sellier and nine Bloc members were elected in the first round. He took office on December 10 and was consistently re-elected thereafter, in 1925 in the first round on the "Bloc des ouvriers et des employés pour la défense des intérêts communaux" (Workers' and employees' bloc for the defense of communal interests) list, by 2,100 votes to Victor Diederich's 1,250, the Communist list's 1,000 and the Radical list's 200. This bloc included non-ideological republicans, “concerned with good municipal management” writes René Sordes, which contributed to Henri Sellier's electoral success outside the socialist base, even though he was a member of the SFIO.

Elected General Councillor for the Seine in 1912, Henri Sellier took advantage of the December 21 law passed the same year, which provided for the establishment of public low-cost housing offices (Offices publics d'habitation à bon marché - HBM). In 1914, he presented a proposal to create the Office départemental des habitations à bon marché, which was adopted by the General Council on July 1 and approved by ministerial decree on July 18, 1915, with an endowment of 15,000 francs. Henri Sellier was appointed Managing Director. Preparing for the future, during the war, he acquired 372 hectares of land for the Office, on which the housing estates of Stains, Champigny-sur-Marne, Le Plessis-Robinson, Châtenay-Malabry, and Suresnes were built. From 1916 to 1920, he was rapporteur for the departmental budget. By the time he was elected mayor in 1919, he already had a vast, coherent project combining town planning, social housing, education, and hygiene to develop the Paris suburbs, particularly in favor of the working class.

=== Garden City (south-western plateau) ===
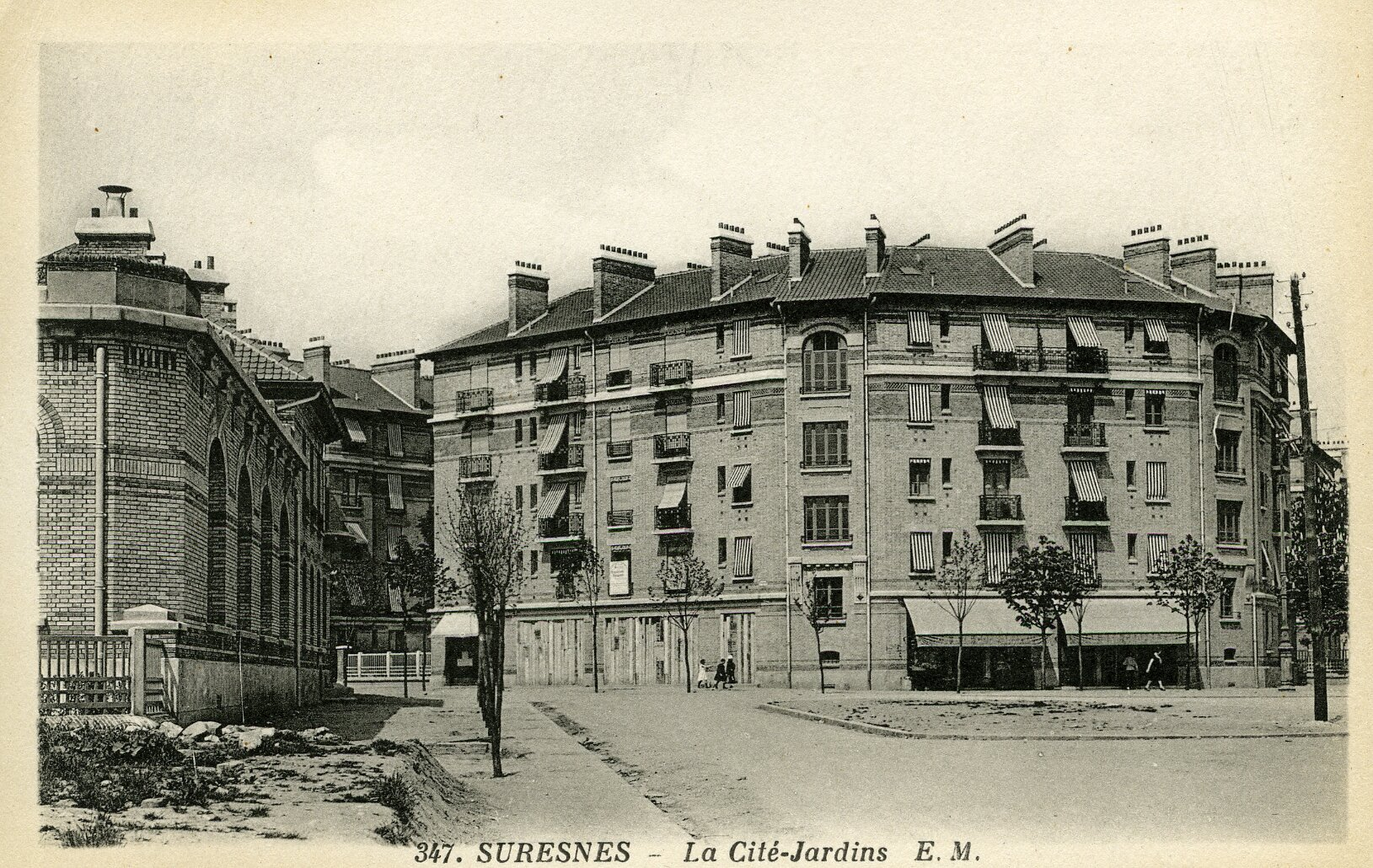
Buildings in the garden city of Suresnes in the 1930s.

At this time, Suresnes' industrialization, the development of factories along its quays and villas on its hillsides, and the increase in its population made it one of the most important towns in the inner suburbs. Like other neighboring towns (Boulogne-Billancourt, Clichy, Levallois-Perret, and Puteaux), Suresnes has an Italian working-class diaspora. Until then, workers had often lived in the dilapidated houses of the old village, and the need to build modern, hygienic dwellings was growing. The decree of March 21, 1919, had declared the expropriation of the land purchased by Henri Sellier in the Plaine de la Fouilleuse, a former imperial farm, to be in the public interest for the benefit of the HBM du département de la Seine, an airy plateau located at the foot of Mont Valérien, but sparsely built (it is home to cereal fields) and far from the town centers of Suresnes and Rueil-Malmaison. In January 1920, at the first meeting of the municipal council, he created the Office Municipal des HBM to study and finance the construction of new buildings. Designed by architect Alexandre Maistrasse, the garden city project was launched to accommodate 10,000 inhabitants based on the English garden city model. A central avenue running east-west is designed to facilitate automobile traffic, with noisy traffic being transferred to the ring road running from Rueil to Suresnes. The buildings, generally four stories high and grouped into islets interspersed with gardens, are brick-and-tile-roofed but include a limited number of apartments. Modern, they come in several categories, with bedrooms and kitchen-dining rooms for large families, others with a shower and central heating, and still others with a bathroom. Commercial premises are provided on the first floor. There are even some small pavilions (Rue de la Fouilleuse and Allée des Gros-Buissons) to ensure a certain social mix. A retirement home was also built on rue de Locarno, modeled on the Flemish beguinages, and a hotel for bachelors with a restaurant and reading room. In 1921, the municipality acquired a 9,250 m² plot of land from the Office des HBM to build a school, which became the Groupe Scolaire Édouard-Vaillant (boys' and girls' elementary schools and a nursery school), with the State and the department largely financing the work. The school was completed in 1923. It was also connected to the Suresnes sewer system.

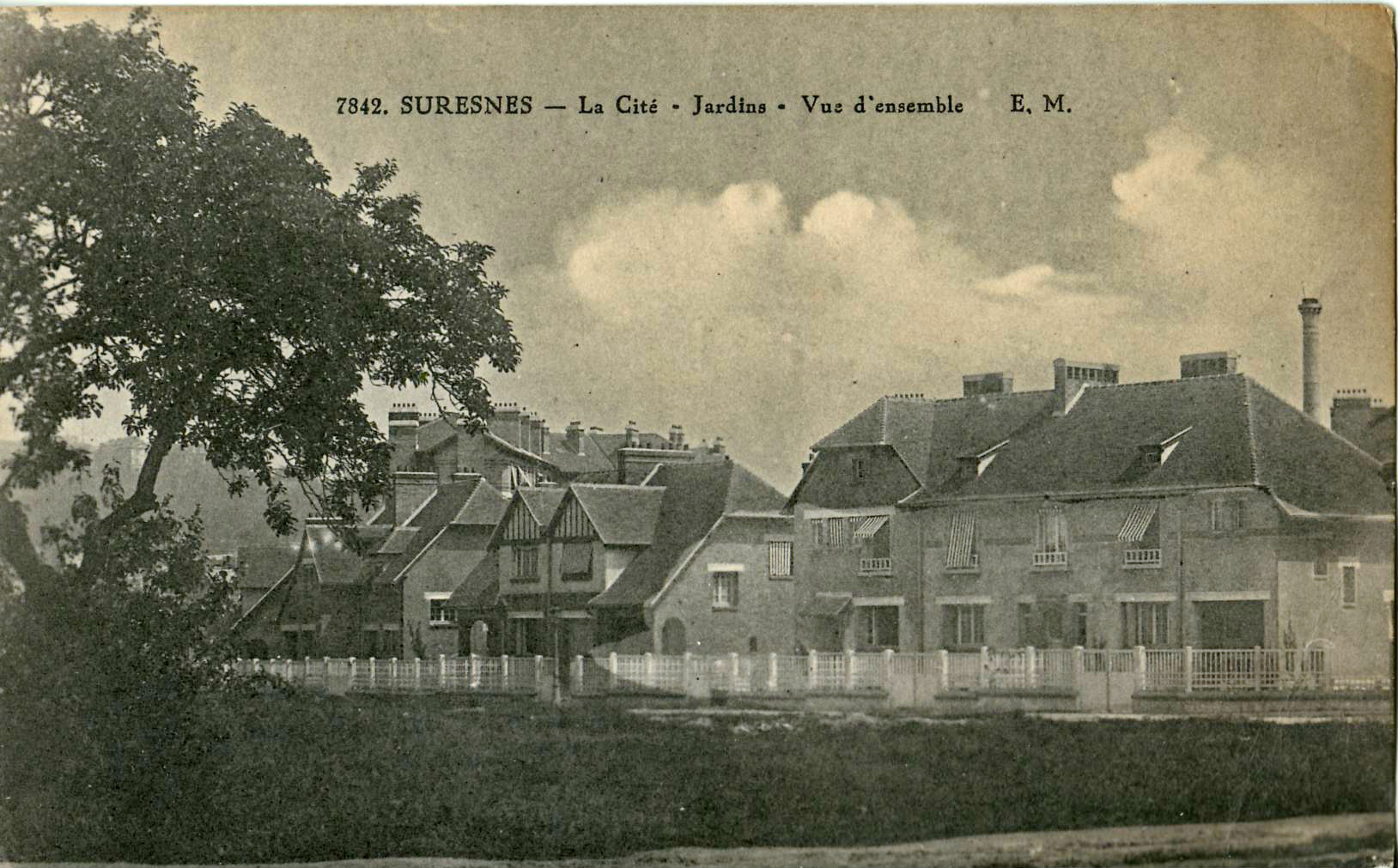
Houses within the garden city.

In 1929, the municipal council of Rueil-Malmaison and the residents concerned agreed that Suresnes should annex part of the area where the garden city would be built. The Chamber of Deputies approved the change on December 19, 1931, and the Senate on May 15, 1932. In April 1929, a statue of Jean Jaurès by sculptor Paul Ducuing and foundryman Gustave Leblanc-Barbedienne was installed in the center of the square on Avenue Édouard-Vaillant (since moved along the school complex). By the end of the 1920s, however, the Édouard-Vaillant school had become too small to accommodate the growing school population. The Aristide-Briand school was therefore built on an 11,367 m² site, a decision approved by decree on June 5, 1930, and designed by architects Alexandre Maistrasse and Julien Quoniam. It includes a boys' and girls' school, drawing rooms, a cinema, a doctor's surgery, kitchens, and even an Art Deco-style swimming pool. On Avenue Wilson, a new nursery school was built on a 4,555 m² site. The State financed 81% of these buildings. In the end, the Aristide-Briand school was entirely devoted to boys and the Édouard-Vaillant school to girls. Schools were rationalized, with classes that were homogeneous in terms of academic and physical performance, and nursery schools were equipped with modern teaching aids (solarium, refectories with small tables, nap room, etc.). By 1935, 1,600 homes had been built, and 900 were still under construction. Laundries and shower baths were also built, as well as a post office at the Croix-du-Roy crossroads, which in 1937 became an annex of the town hall. Finally, a village hall was built.

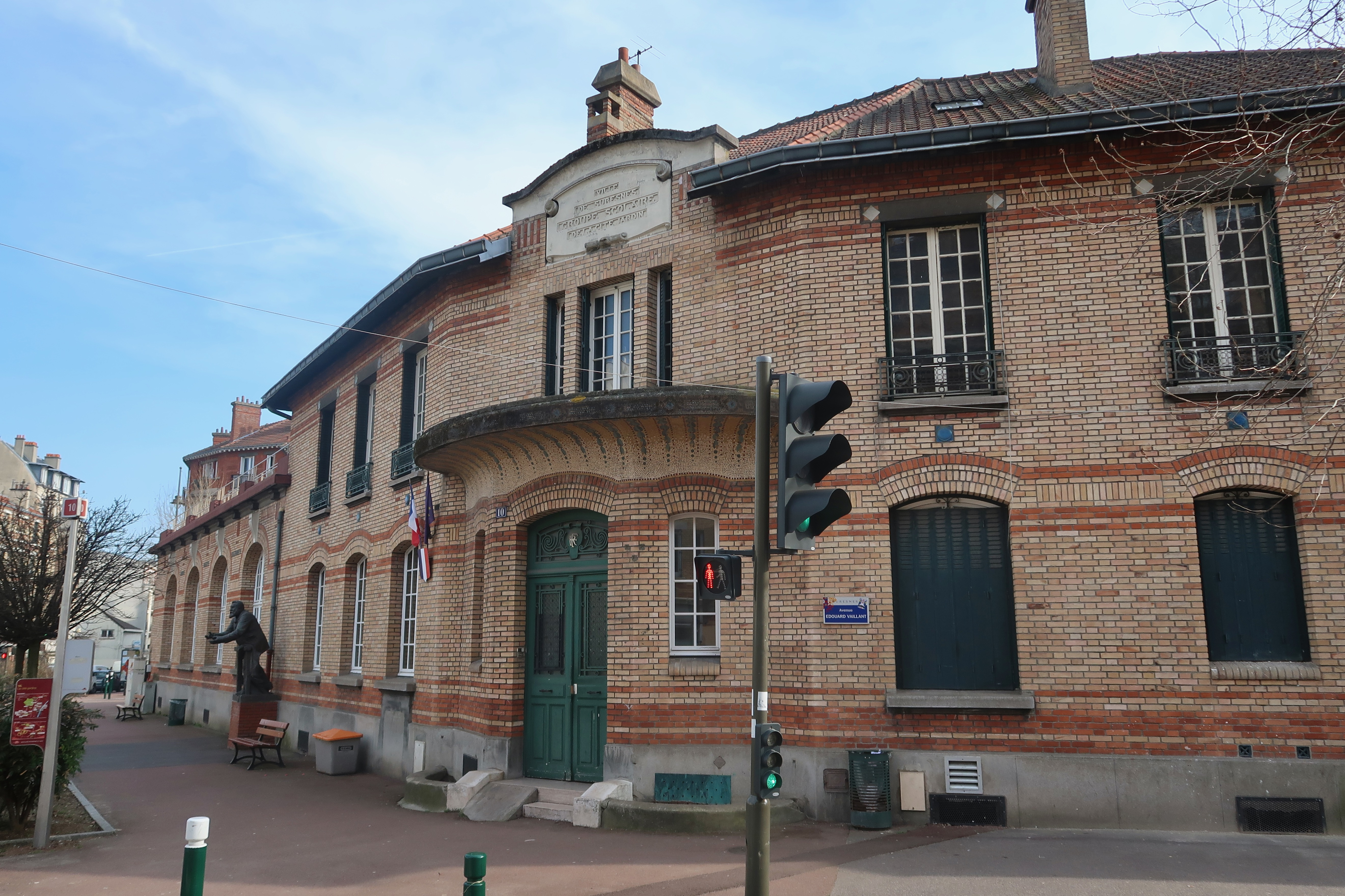
School on Avenue Édouard-Vaillant, with a statue of Jean Jaurès.

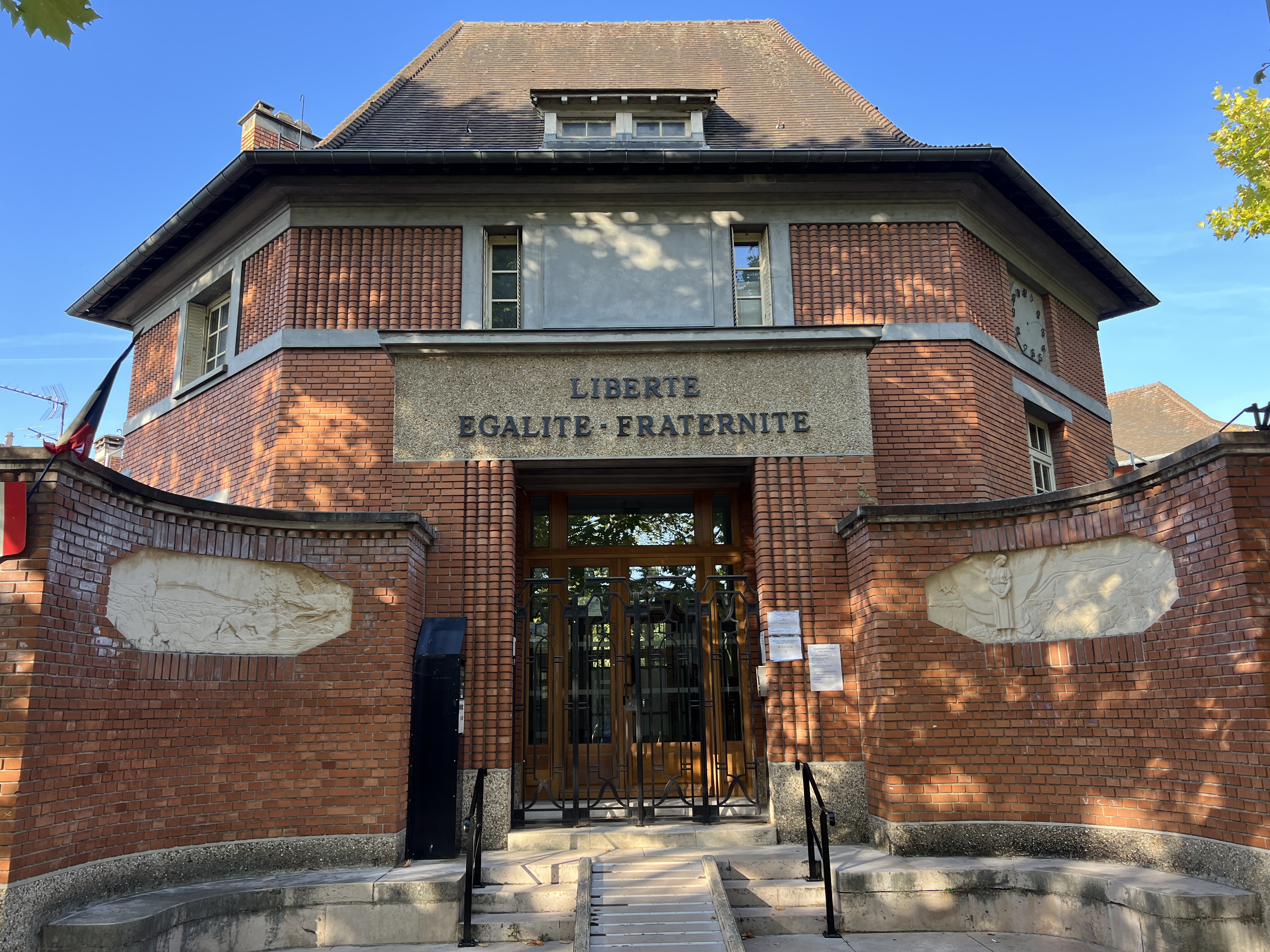
Wilson Kindergarten.

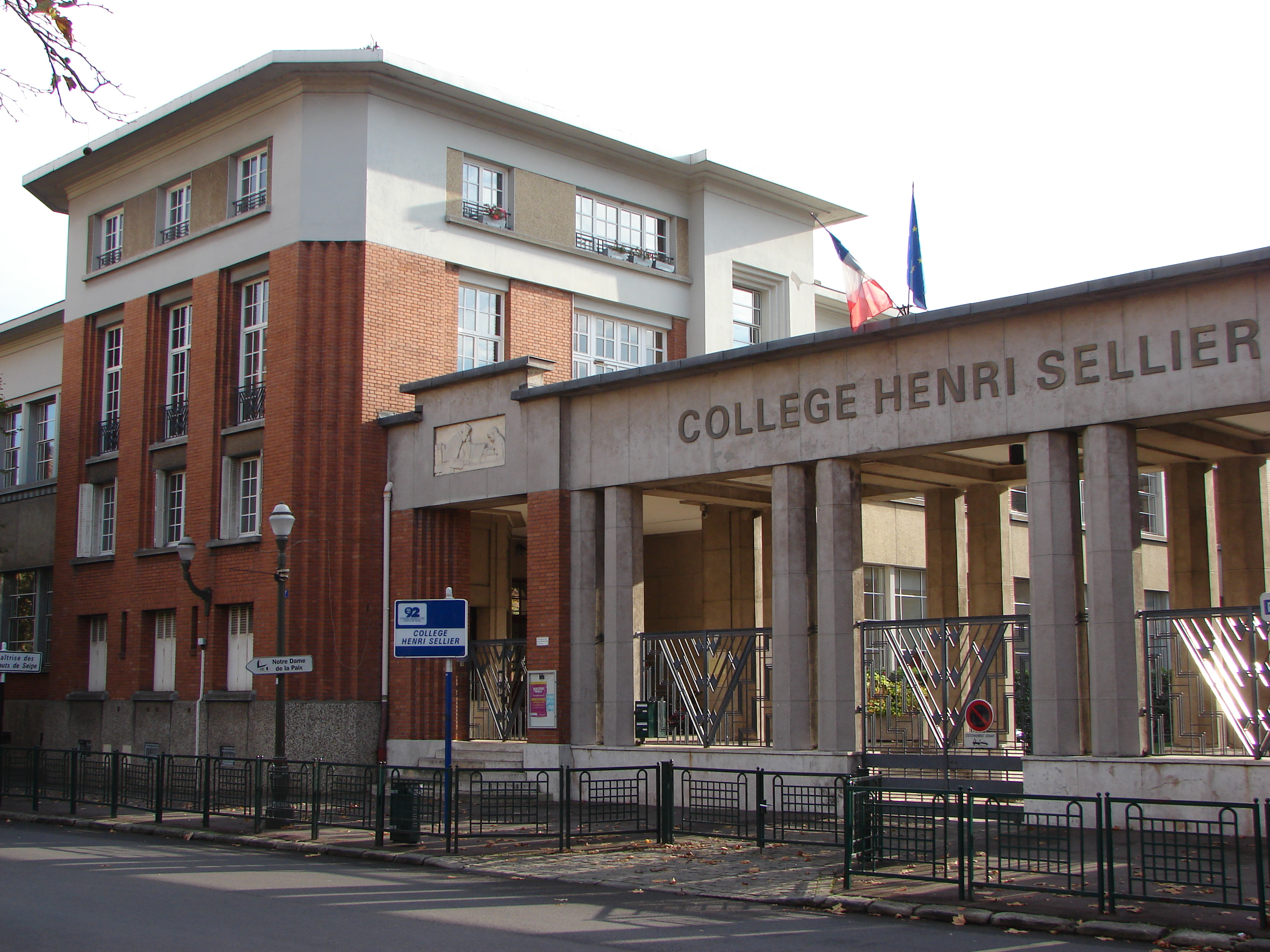
Henri-Sellier College, former Aristide-Briand school group.

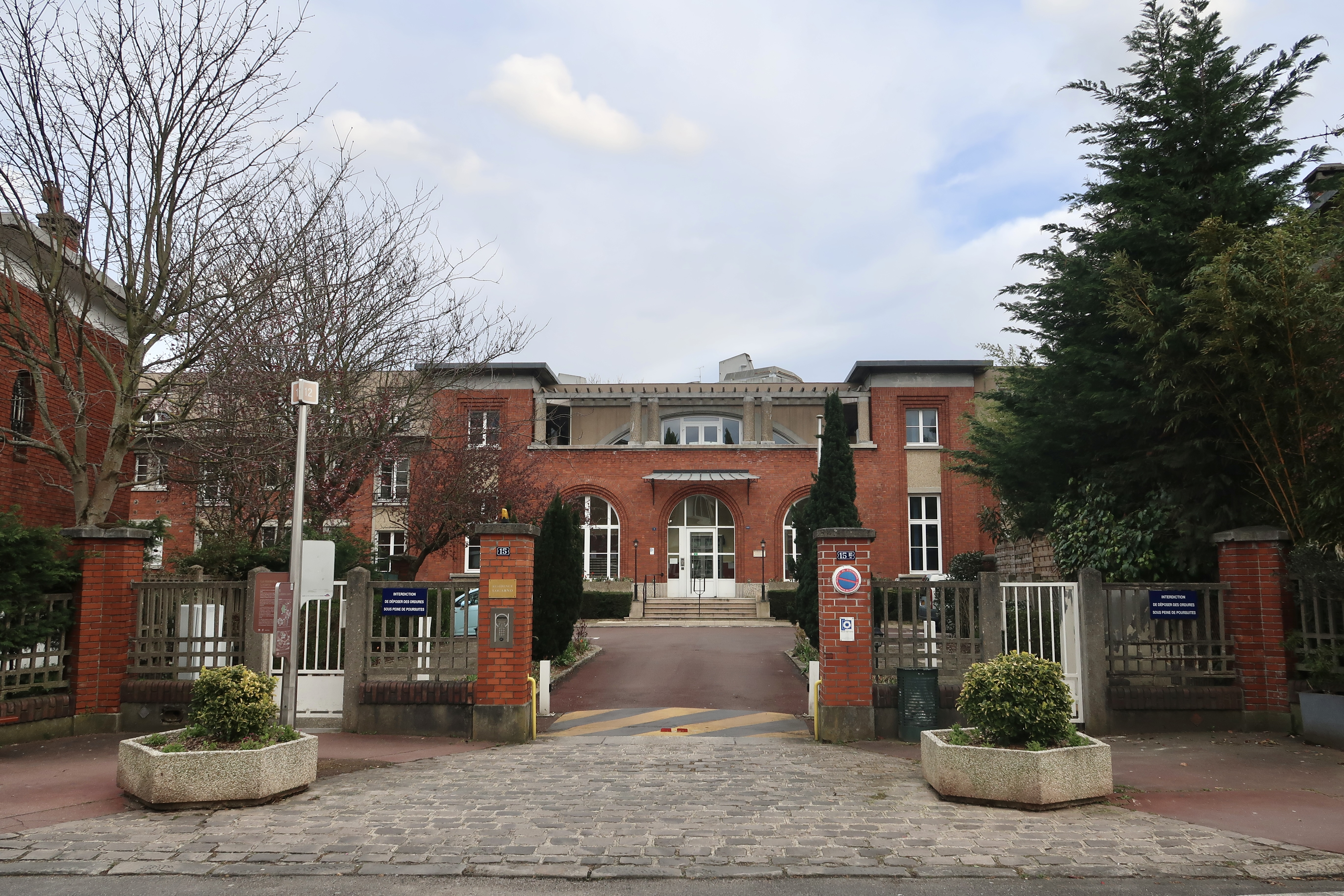
Locarno Residence.

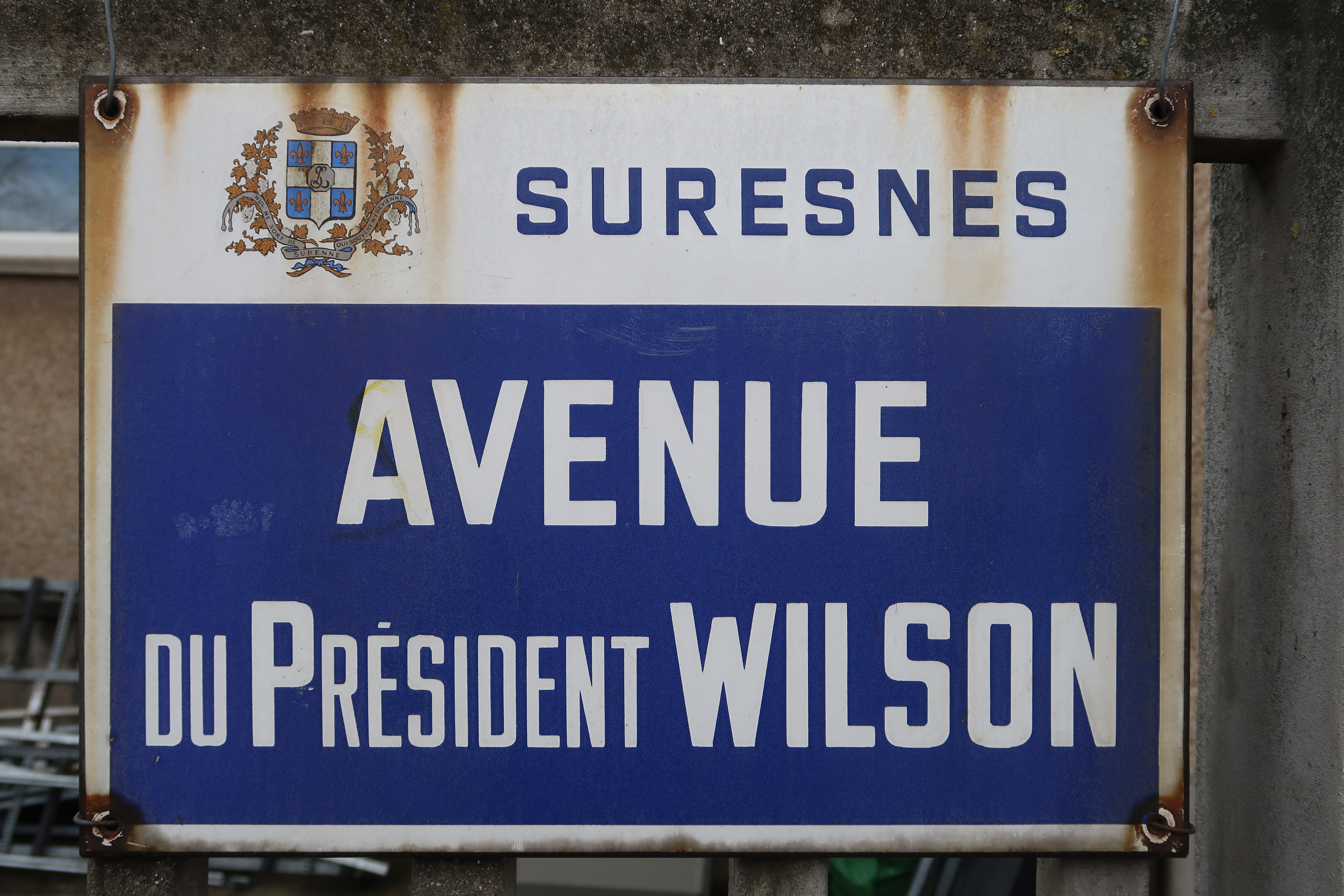
Plaque on Avenue du Président-Wilson, in homage to the American president, who came to Suresnes in 1919.

The choice of street names for the garden city was based on the following perspective, as expressed by the mayor at the city council meeting of March 22, 1932: “The municipality wished to pay tribute to the thinkers and statesmen of all religions and nationalities who, over the centuries up to the present tragic era, have held out to humanity the torch that should guide it towards definitive peace and the fraternity of peoples.” Sully, Grotius, William Penn, Father de Saint-Pierre, Romain Rolland, Jean Jaurès, Léon Bourgeois, d'Estournelle de Constant, Woodrow Wilson, Frank Billings Kellogg, Louis Loucheur (many Suresnois benefited from his law to build pavilions) and Gustav Stresemann. Henri Sellier adds in his speech that these are modest tributes, "devoid of official pomp and circumstance. No minister will come to deliver a harangue laboriously crafted from traditional platitudes." Indeed, for most of these projects, Henri Sellier never organized a solemn inauguration attended by a host of VIPs. He also decided to name certain streets after plants and flowers and to retain the historic name of La Fouilleuse, as well as that of the Croix-du-Roy crossroads, a term by which “it has been known for centuries,” thus respecting the heritage of Suresnes. This is an ancient locality where a cross once stood, and which has been shown on maps since 1669. According to tradition, it was erected in the presence of François I, but its earliest traces date to 1490.

In 1919, Suresnes parish priest Patrice Flynn (who became bishop of Nevers in 1932) planned to create a place of pilgrimage to the Virgin Mary in the town. He therefore acquired a plot of land on the slopes of the southwestern plateau, at the corner of Chemin des Hoquettes and Rue des Raguidelles (the latter was lined with orchards until the First World War). (Note: It perhaps owes its name to the medieval first name Raguidel or Ragidel, given to a character in Breton novels or a poem by Hodenc.) The project was named Notre-Dame de la Salette church: designed by architect Pierre Sardou, it featured a large nave topped by a bell tower, with an unobstructed view of the Sacré-Coeur Basilica in Paris. Cardinal-Archbishop Louis-Ernest Dubois blessed the foundation stone on September 24, 1922. In the end, however, only the crypt was built. At the same time, Henri Sellier offered the archbishop a plot of land in the center of the garden city to build a church. The La Salette project, which was too far off-center and risked being duplicated, was abandoned and became a simple auxiliary chapel, then a parish church. Thanks to a donation from a family from the north of France who wanted to build a place of worship in a working-class housing estate on the outskirts of Paris, the church of Notre-Dame-de-la-Paix was built in the garden city, under the orders of the vicar-general Monseigneur Rouzé, in charge of the “Cardinal's building sites.” The architect was Dom Bellot, a Benedictine monk from Solesmes. On April 17, 1932, Cardinal Verdier laid the foundation stone, where he sealed the year's coins. In a speech, the administrator of La Salette, Father Delattre, thanked “the workmen who, at the cost of a lot of hard work, have made the broken ground passable.” On April 5, 1934, the Cardinal returned to bless the new church, now open for worship. On October 7, it became a parish, with Father Marot as its first parish priest. Initially, the church was to feature an octagonal bell tower, but the war and financial problems prevented its completion.

There had been a small Protestant community in Suresnes, meeting in an apartment on Rue Sainte-Appoline (now Rue Berthelot) since 1893. While several neighboring communes already had Protestant places of worship, these faithful maintained their desire to remain in Suresnes, continuing to worship in modest conditions. When the garden city was being built, Henri Sellier envisaged the creation of a Protestant church. Still, it wasn't until after the Second World War that the Paris Lutheran Church became the tenant of a garden on Avenue d'Estournelles-de-Constant, near Avenue de Sully, whose name (in homage to the famous Protestant minister) had been chosen by the former mayor. A wooden church was first built, nicknamed "la baraque" (the hut) and later renamed "Église de la Réconciliation" (Church of Reconciliation) in 1947. In 1954, it was replaced by the Protestant temple of Suresnes, built in stone in the Romanesque and Scandinavian styles.

After its two main construction phases (1919-1929 and 1949-1958), the garden city comprises 3,300 housing units.

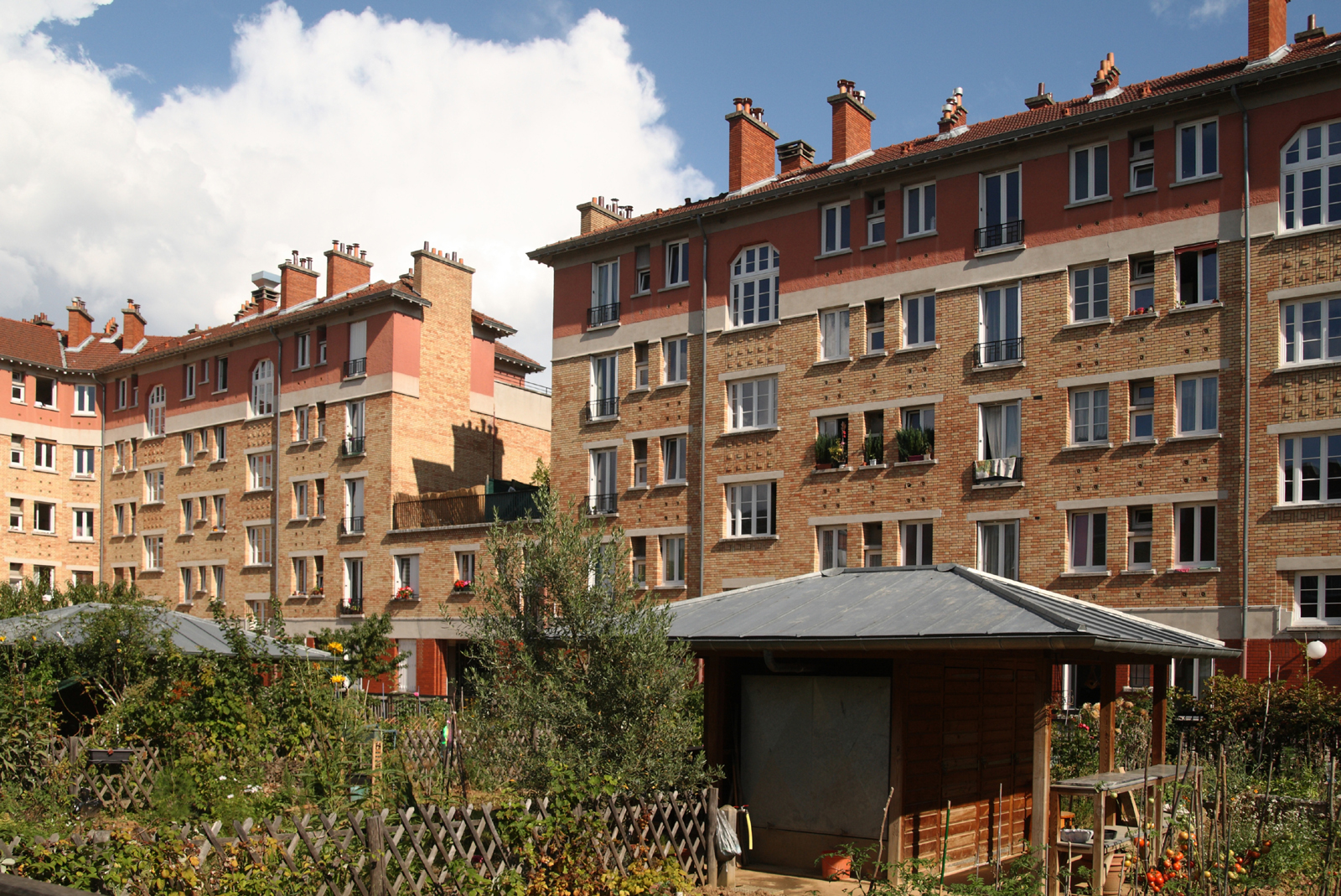
Buildings and family gardens.

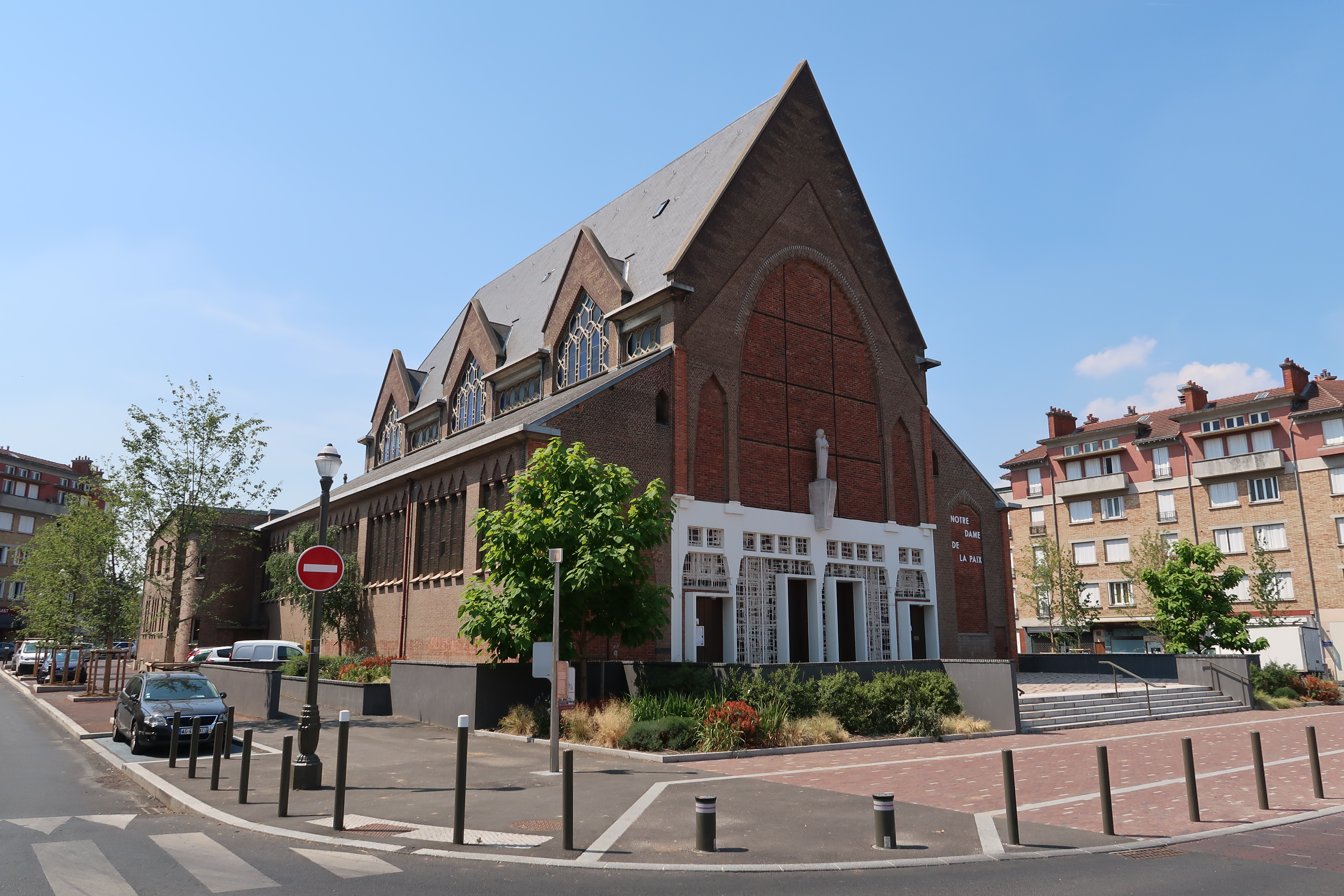
Our Lady of Peace Catholic Church.

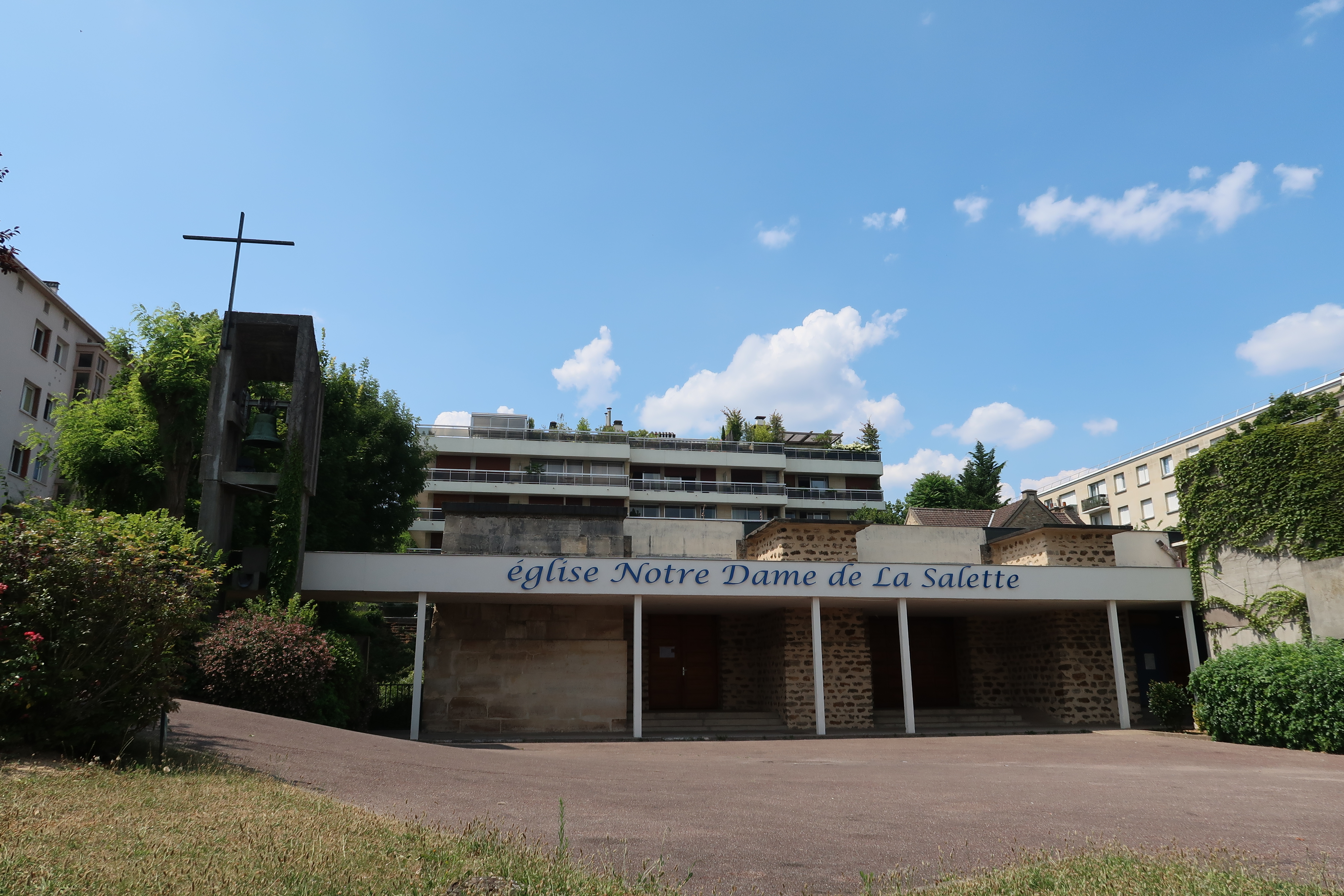
Chapel of Our Lady of La Salette.

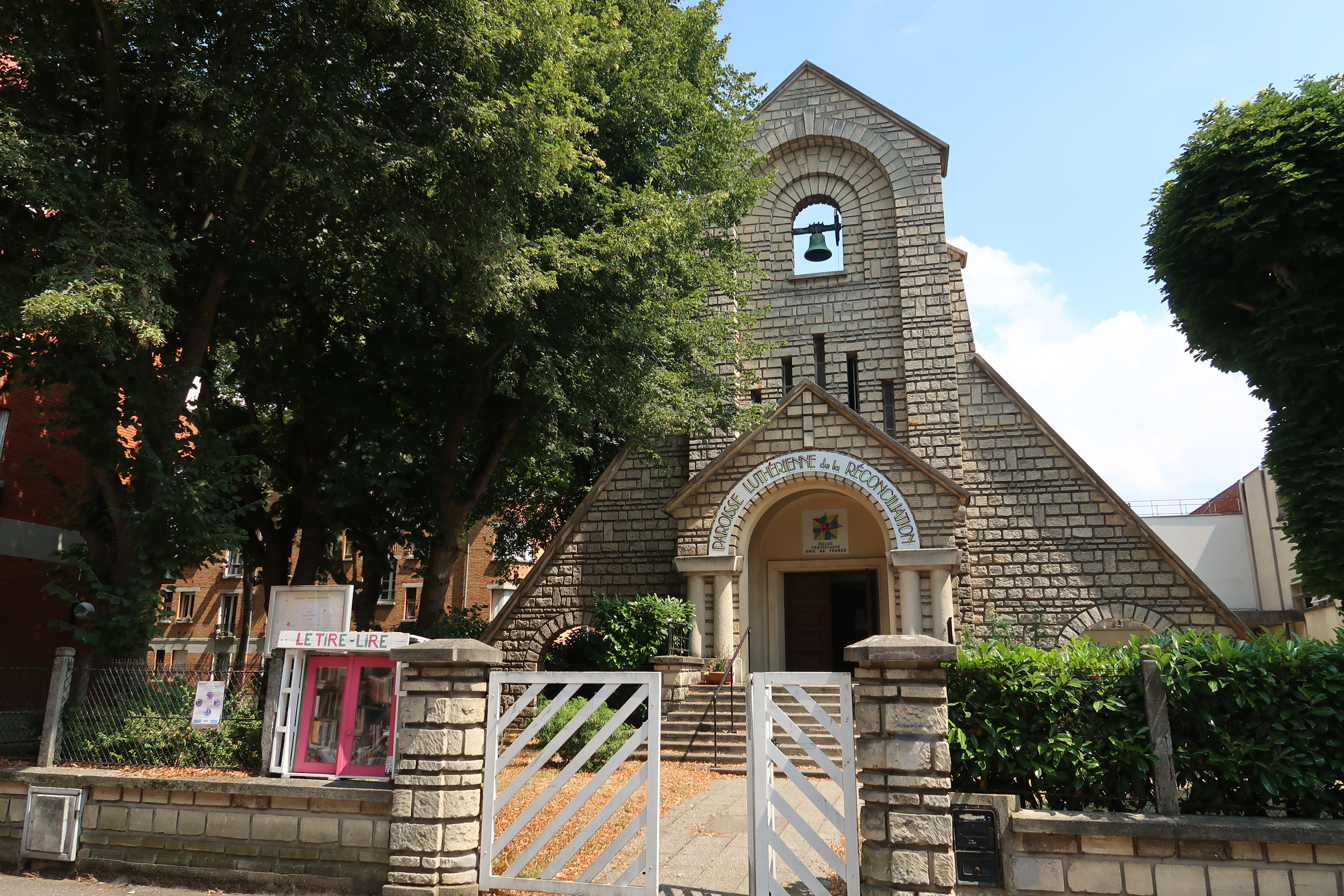
Protestant Church of Reconciliation.

=== North and South plateaus ===
==== Urbanization of the plateaus and new housing estates ====
On the south plateau was a vast, hilly area between the garden city and the Mont Valérien fort, where pavilions were tentatively being built. Henri Sellier redeveloped the old cultivation paths that once ran through the vineyards and fields, aligning them and installing sewers, water, gas, and electricity to enable the rational construction of buildings in the future and to prevent the development of a shantytown. The new streets link the plateau more easily to the lower part of Suresnes, whose names reflect the history of wine-growing and nature: Rue des Bons-Raisons, Rue des Vignes, and Chemin des Roses. This is one of the last agricultural areas in Suresnes.

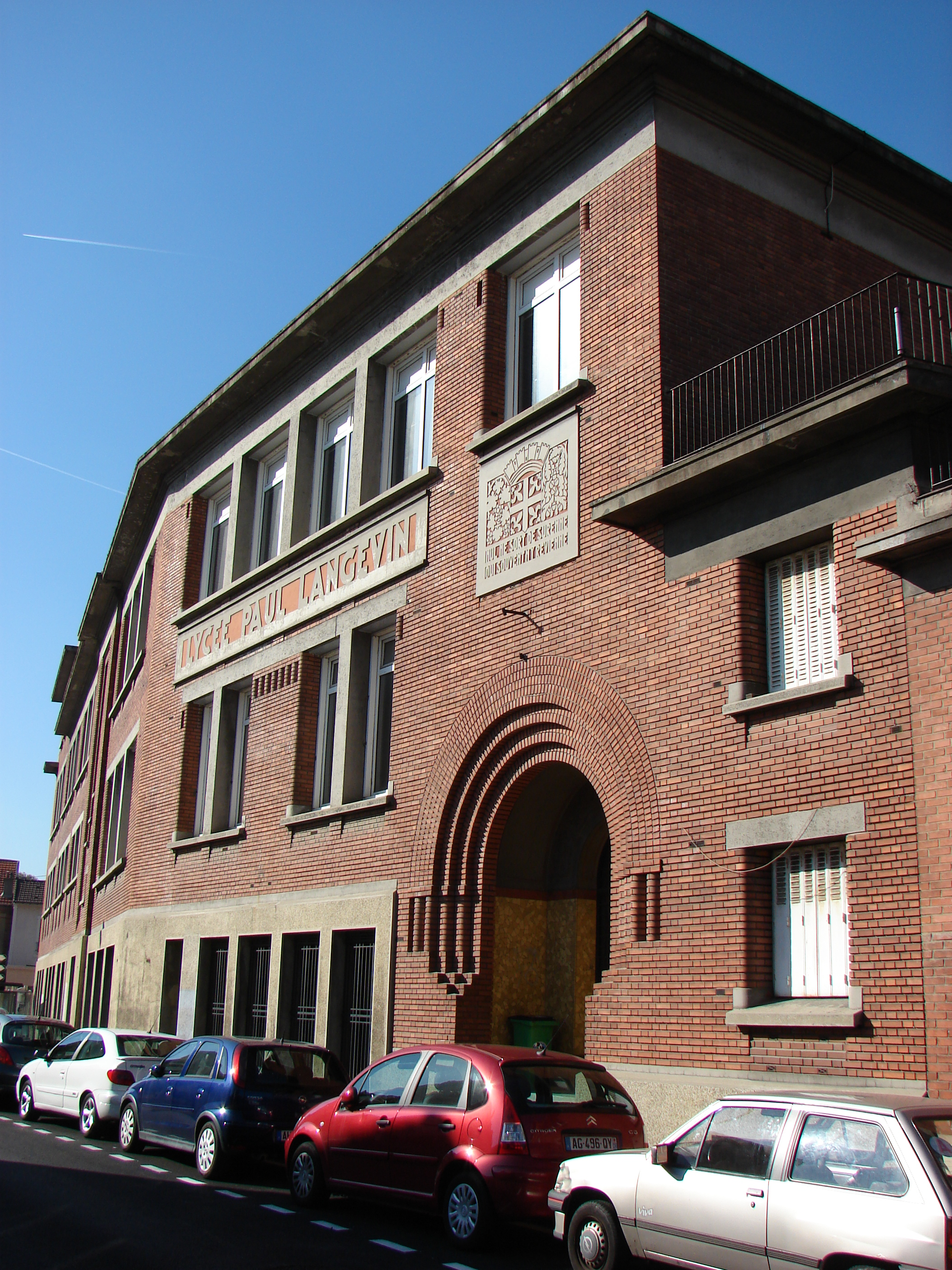
Paul-Langevin high school, formerly Payret-Dortail school, the largest secondary school in the town.

On the less exposed northern plateau, villas have been springing up above the railroad for some time, but at a good distance from Nanterre, where ragpickers had settled. Until the beginning of the 20th century, there were a few middle-class residences and boarding houses, as well as vineyards (until 1953) and orchards. The inhabitants of this plateau generally worked in Paris. Still, they were fairly isolated from the center of Suresnes, as the 1,500-meter embankment offered no pathway across the line, except at the ends or via a footbridge impassable to cars. While Victor Diederich had planned to build a modest school given the sparse population, Henri Sellier foresaw the rapid development of the plateau. Puteaux had created a housing development on the heights of its cemetery, and the Putéolian schools were a long way from it. The two municipalities therefore agreed that the school to be built on the northern plateau of Suresnes would accept 80% of Puteaux pupils, in exchange for a subsidy.

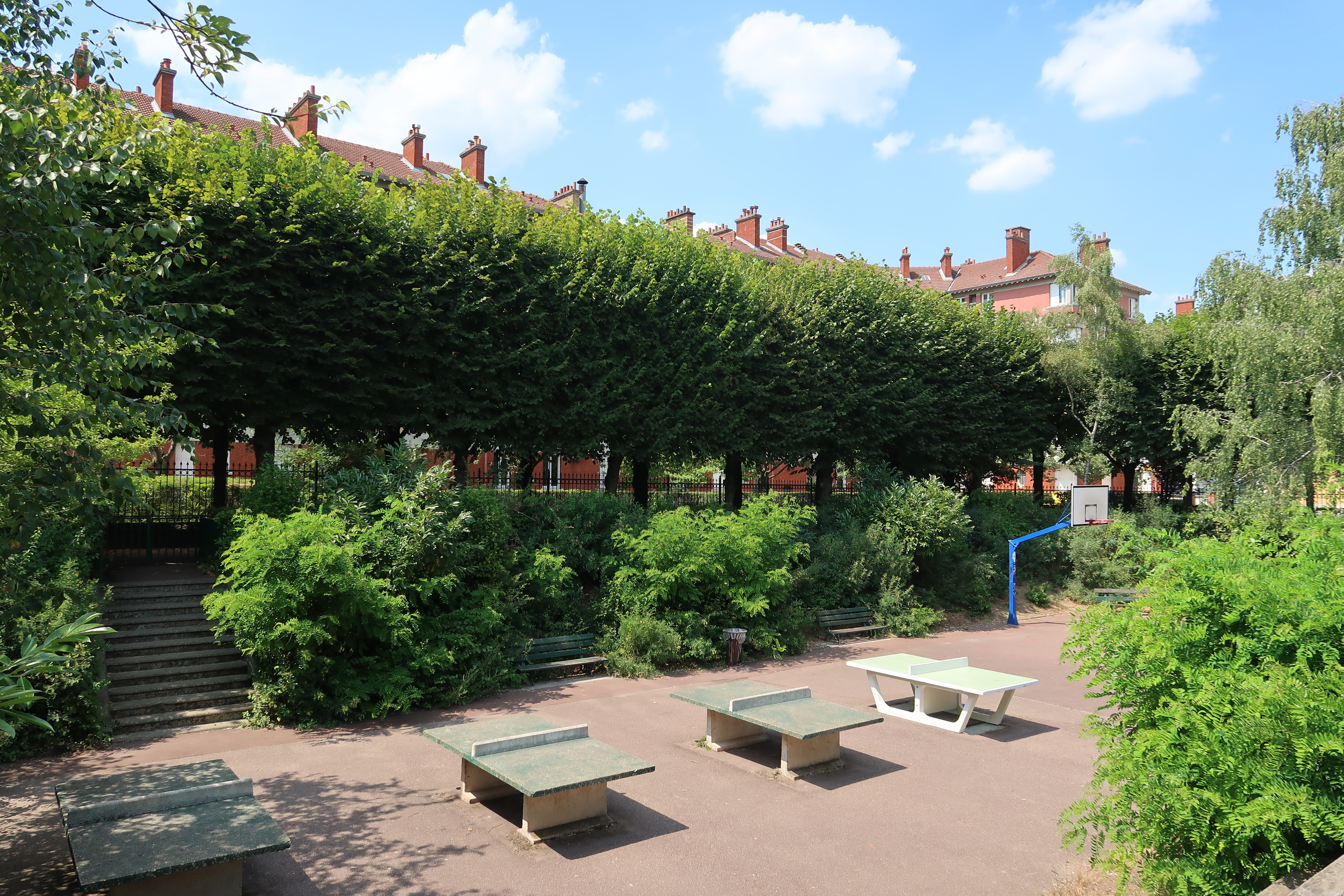
Léon-Bourgeois Square, in the garden city, reflects the mayor's desire to develop healthy and airy spaces.

In July 1920, architect Maurice Payret-Dortail was commissioned to build a school on a 12,000 m² plot of land between Rue Voltaire, Chemin des Cherchevets, and Rue de la Liberté, at a cost of around 15 million francs, financed largely by the State and the département. The school complex includes a nursery school, girls' and boys' elementary school, an upper elementary school for boys to prepare for the secretarial, industrial, and administrative professions, and a practical school of commerce and industry to train employees and skilled workers. The school was inaugurated on October 1, 1927, and was named after its architect, Maurice Payret-Dortail; Czechoslovak President Edvard Beneš in 1939; and physicist Paul Langevin in 1948. Until 1933, the school also offered a pre-apprenticeship course for girls to prepare them for the fashion and sewing trades. The establishment also includes a swimming pool with shower baths (the walls of which are covered in gilded ceramics, with a statue of a woman dominating the pool). This gymnasium doubles as a party hall and cinema, a doctor's surgery, a physics amphitheater, a chemistry laboratory, a wood and ironworking workshop, a large refectory with kitchens, and an outdoor sports track.

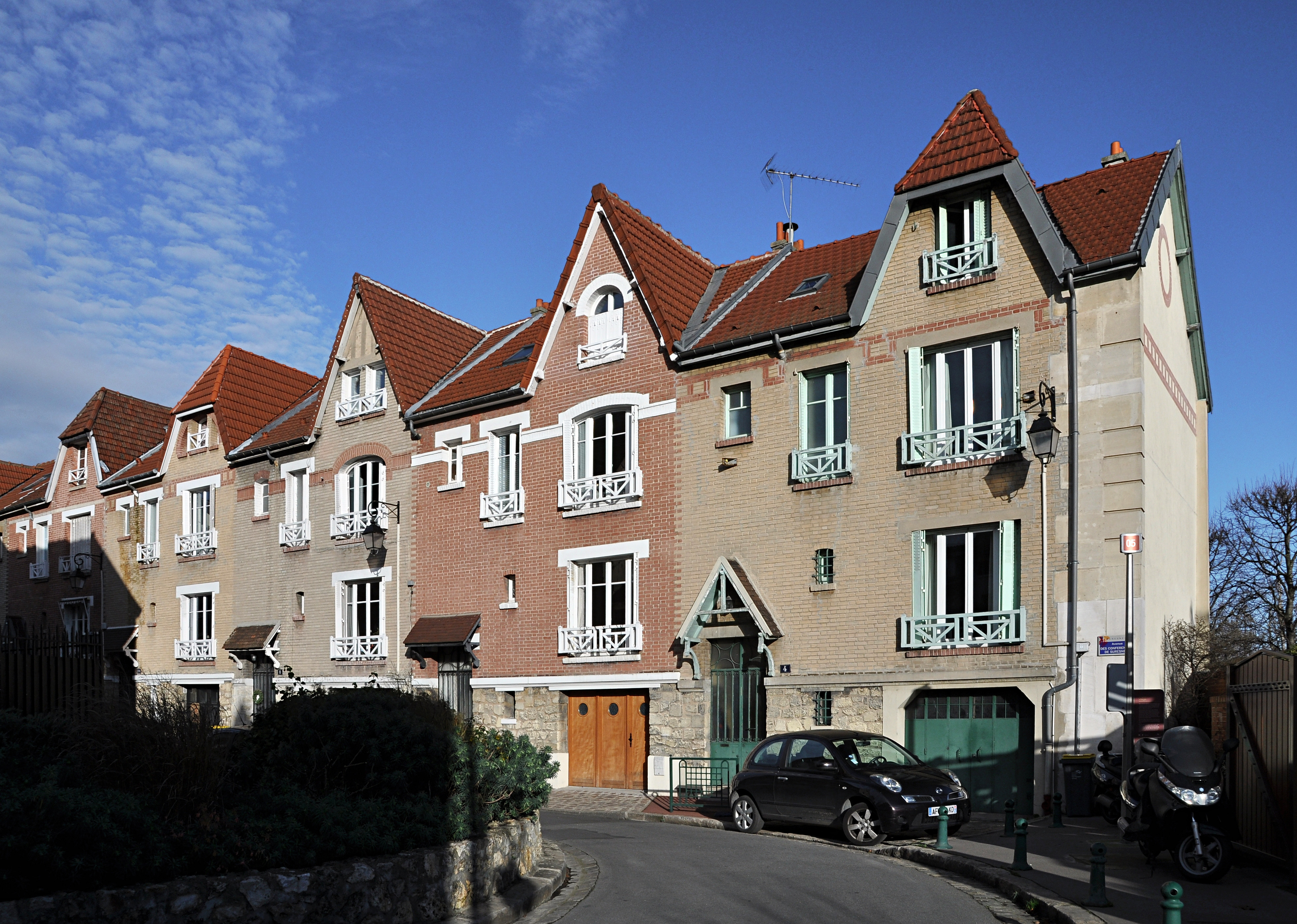
Some houses in the "English Village".

The school is very modern, with an emphasis on air and light, based on the Anglo-Saxon campus model, and respecting the site's slopes. Recent techniques are used (seamless parquet flooring, ceramics, automatic ventilation, diffused light, etc.). Brick and enamel are the dominant materials. Several plaques are engraved on the façade, including the motto of Suresnes and the ideology of this educational project: “This school group, where the love of France, Humanity, and the Homeland is taught, was built in 1927.” Pupils range in age from 2 to 18. However, the school quickly outgrew its capacity: in its first year, it took in 22 classes instead of the planned 17. 125 Suresnois were expected to study there, but in the end, 600 did. Over time, the number of Putéoliens declined. In addition, the school had no upper elementary school for girls. So, 350 meters from the school, the commune built a school on two properties purchased from private owners in 1920 and 1931. The upper elementary school was later enlarged by the architect Demay, who added commercial teaching. Like the Payret-Dortail school, this one took hygiene into account and made the most of the gardens of the former houses. It later became a high school for girls and is now the Collège Émile-Zola. The municipality also took the opportunity to rehabilitate the surrounding roads to improve traffic flow.

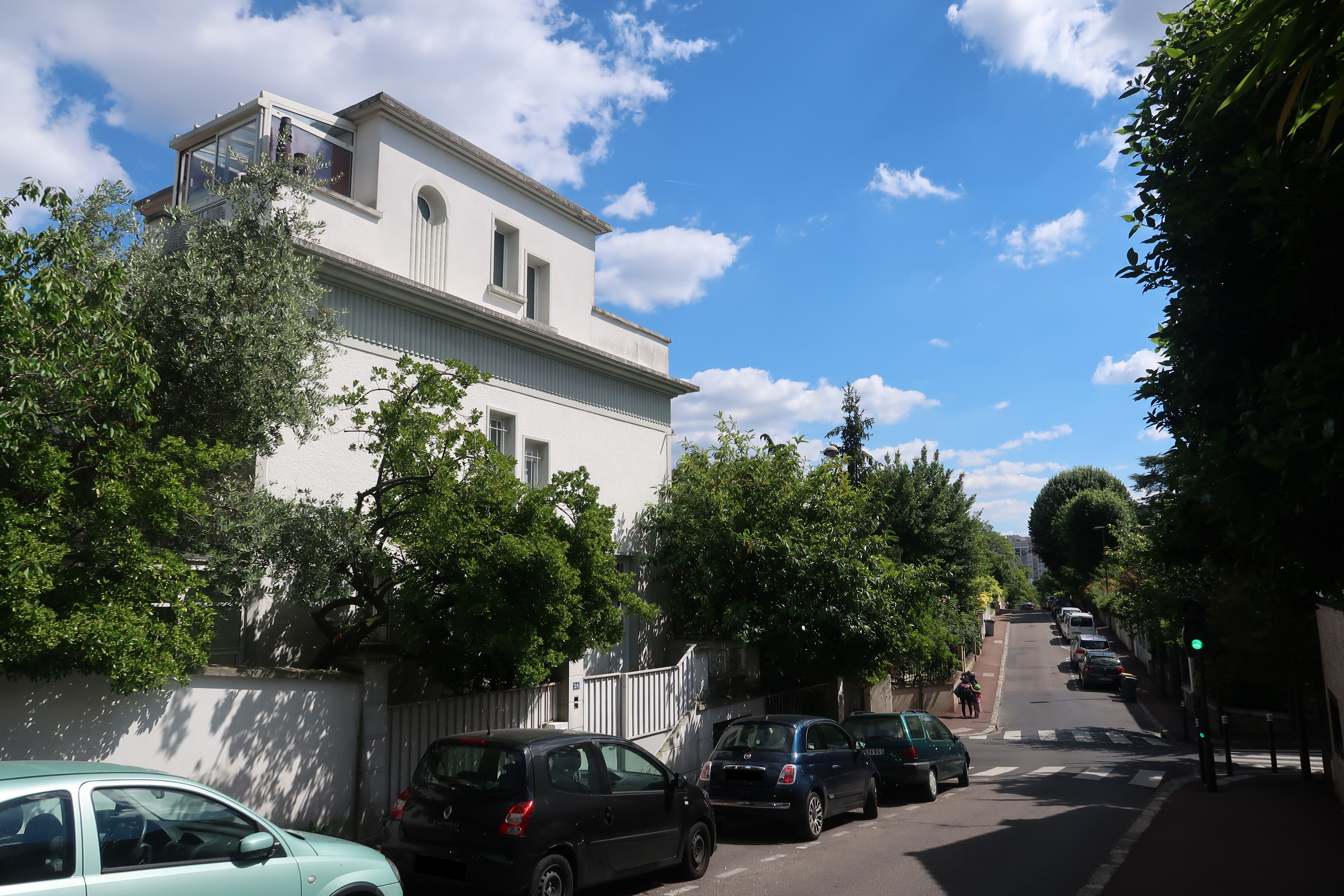
Modern house on Avenue de la Criolla, not far from which an explanatory panel tells the story.

At the time, Nanterre had two enclaves on the northern plateau, the first between Rue de la Liberté and Rue des Parigot, the second between Rue des Chênes and the crossroads with Rue des Bas-Roger and route Charles-X. (Note: Current route of the Resistance Fighters.) In January 1929, a resident, acting as spokesman for 155 signatories, asked for the area to be annexed to Suresnes, a decision approved by both municipal councils and authorized by prefectural decree on April 27, 1929. This was the fourth annexation of Suresnes since 1792, after Pas-Saint-Maurice, Mont Valérien, and Rueil-Malmaison.

In 1923, the private housing estate known as the "English Village" was built on Rue Diderot, Rue du Bac, Avenue des Conférences, and Avenue de la Belle-Gabrielle (in the historic town center), near the quayside, to exacting specifications. It was built on the site of the former Meunier dye works. In 1926, Avenue de la Criolla took on its present name, in homage to a property subdivided in 1924. “Criolla” is a name given by its owners, Mr. Luque and his wife, born Arias, originally from Peru, meaning “Creole”.

==== Outdoor school and urban development ====
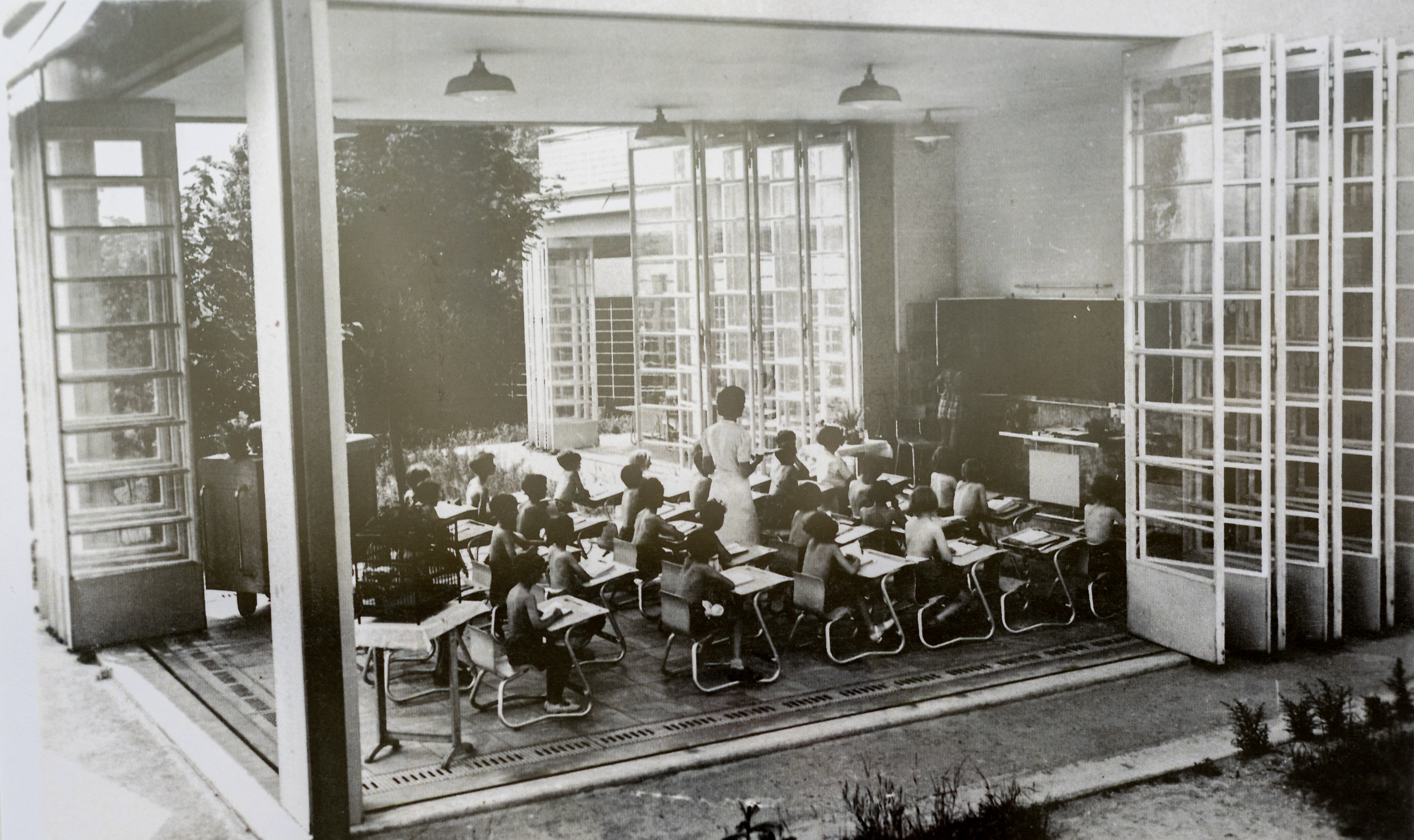
Class at the Suresnes open-air school, where the confinement of traditional school establishments is avoided.

Continuing the policy of summer camps, Henri Sellier was nevertheless aware that this was not enough for some sick children who needed constant supervision, far from the confined premises of ordinary schools, and who required constant physical effort. From 1920 to 1930, a summer school was established at the former Fouilleuse stud farm, but the mayor ultimately decided to build a permanent facility. He, therefore, purchased the property known as "de la Motte", built on the slopes of Mont Valérien, on part of the former Landes estate, and commissioned the architects Eugène Beaudouin and Marcel Lods to draw up bold plans. The State and the department once again financed the work, carried out between 1932 and 1935 at a cost of around six million francs. The school comprises three classes for boys and three for girls, plus two nursery classes, accommodating 300 children. On the north side, a large wall houses the entrances, from which the classrooms lead off on the garden side. Cube-shaped with three glass walls, they are distributed throughout the park, allowing air to pass through thanks to movable walls, the floor maintaining a temperature of 30-35 degrees, just like a curtain of warm air. A swimming pool is also located in the park. Showers, canteens, and medical facilities are located on the premises to the north of the site. There are no stairs, but inclined surfaces. Schoolchildren follow a normal curriculum here, but can only enter after a medical examination. An outdoor world map that still exists is used for geography lessons. The school was admired beyond Suresnes. When Albert Laprade inaugurated a monument to Henri Sellier near the town hall in 1962, he declared in his speech that "people still come here on pilgrimage. [...] I remember the vivid impression made on the great American architect Frank Lloyd Wright when, in July 1939, I showed him this work, which was so advanced for its time."

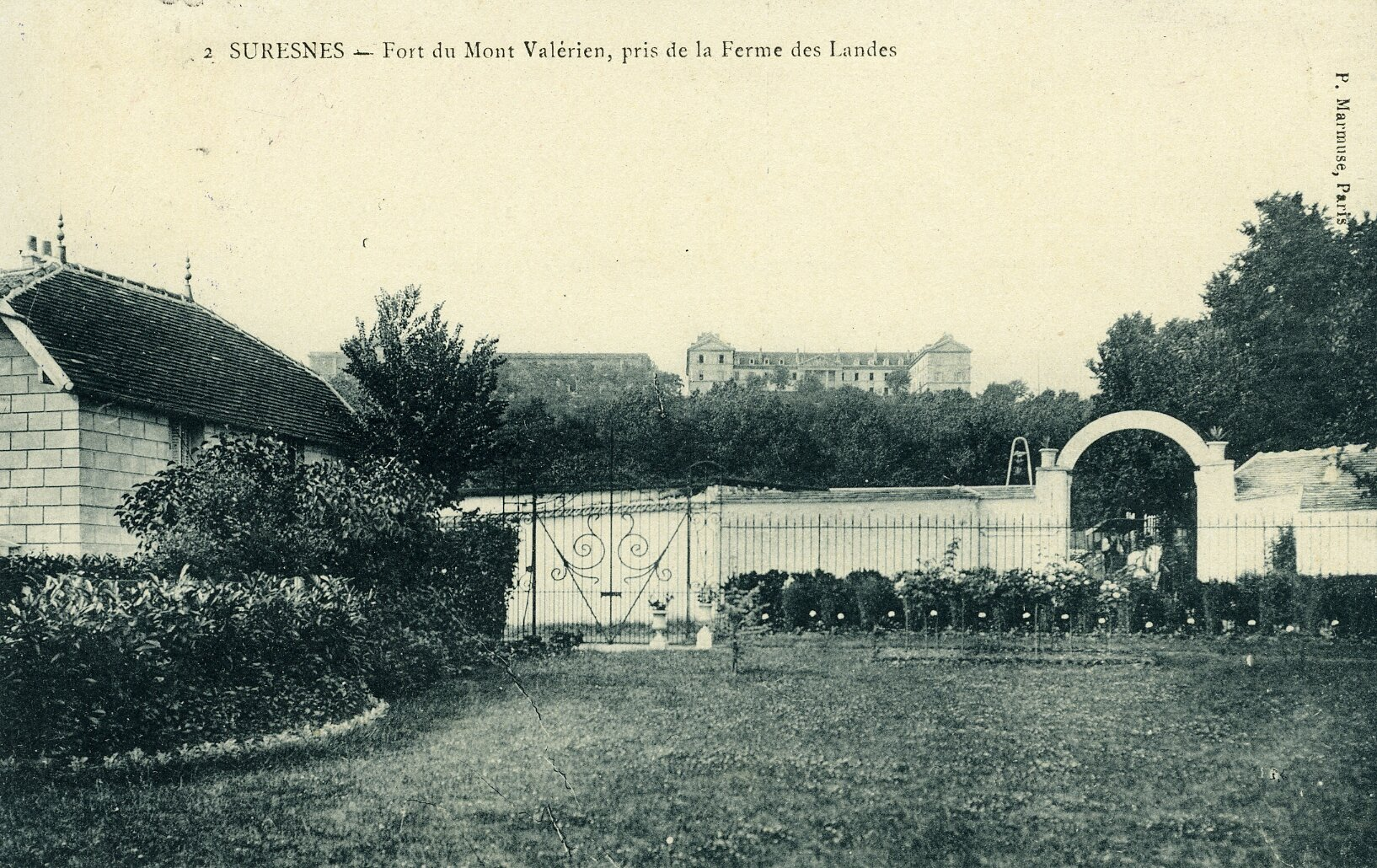
The Landes farm (now gone) and Mont Valérien.

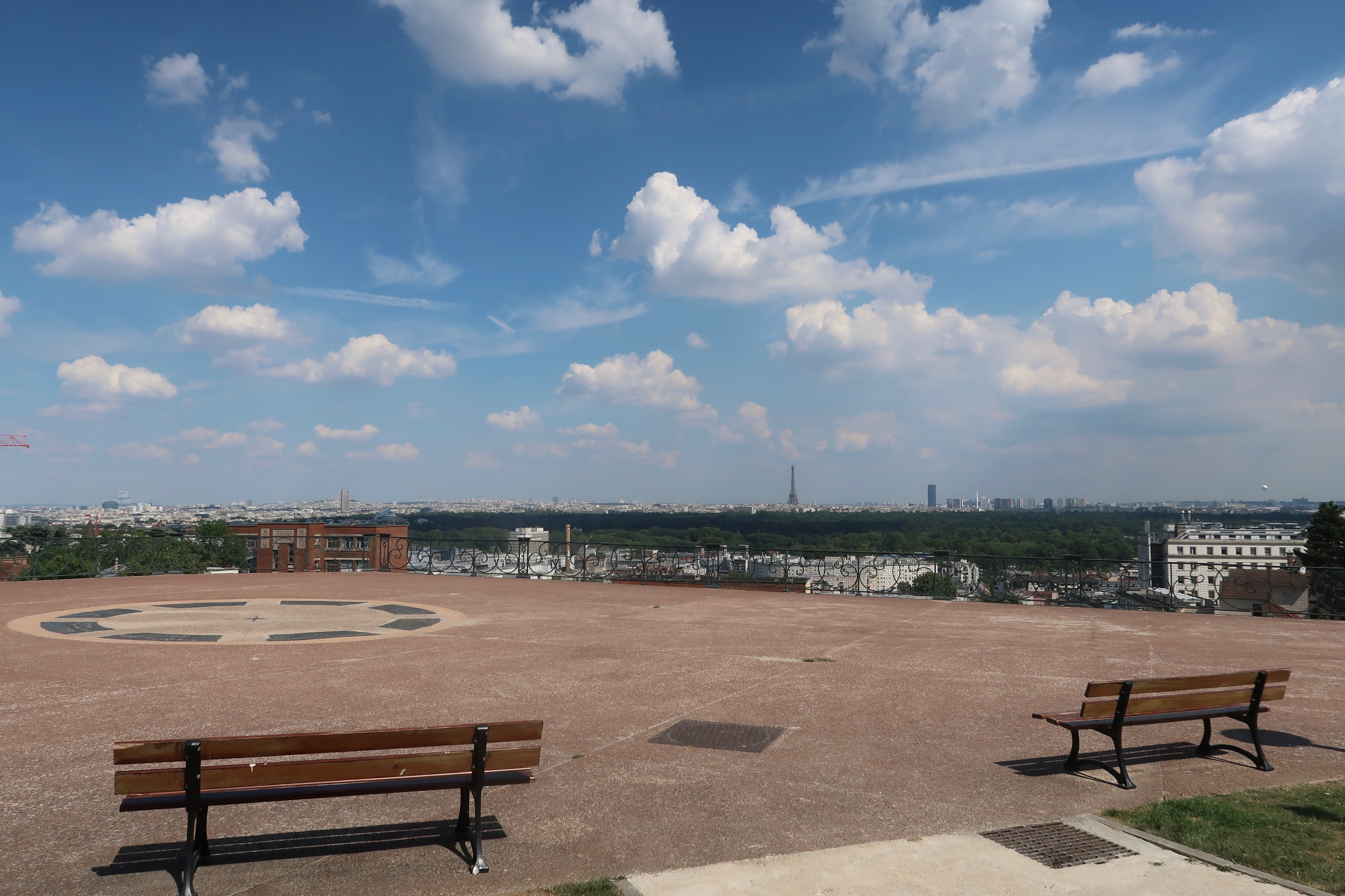
Fécheray Terrace, with a view of Paris, a venue for festive and cultural events.

In 1926, the Mont Valérien fort was stripped of some of its military prerogatives, and the surrounding area, hitherto non ædificandi, lost this character. Henri Sellier had foreseen this requalification and asked the Seine General Council to organize these 10 hectares of land for the public, “which had the most marvelous view of Paris.” A decree dated February 17, 1927, approved the plans. These included the Fécheray heights and the foot of the American cemetery. Here, all that remained of the Château des Landes was an old orangery, home to Alice Hoffmann, born Green, niece (or cousin, depending on the source) of American President Franklin D. Roosevelt. The park had preserved a fountain known as the Piron fountain (named after an 18th-century Suresnois, unrelated to the famous poet). On July 7, 1928, the estate was encumbered by a servitude, prompting the owner to protest, using her connections or recalling her humanitarian action during the First World War, but to no avail. On March 14, 1934, the department declared the acquisition to be in the public interest. However, the Landes farm, located on the property, continued to supply Suresnois with milk until 1939. Today, this land forms the Parc des Landes. The department created several paths around the fort and, further down, the Fécheray terrace was built in 1935: a tree-lined promenade with benches and an unobstructed view of the capital. Henri Sellier even considered using the fort's platform as an airfield, but the project never came to fruition. To protect the mountain site, regulations were enacted to limit the height of buildings on the southern plateau. In 1938, the department donated the land it had developed to Suresnes. In April 1939, Henri Sellier decided to rename part of the Rue du Mont-Valérien after President Roosevelt. He had a plaque installed in his honor on the corner of Rue Carnot on May 28, 1940: "Apostle of humanity / Champion of democracy / Savior of peace". The plaque no longer exists.

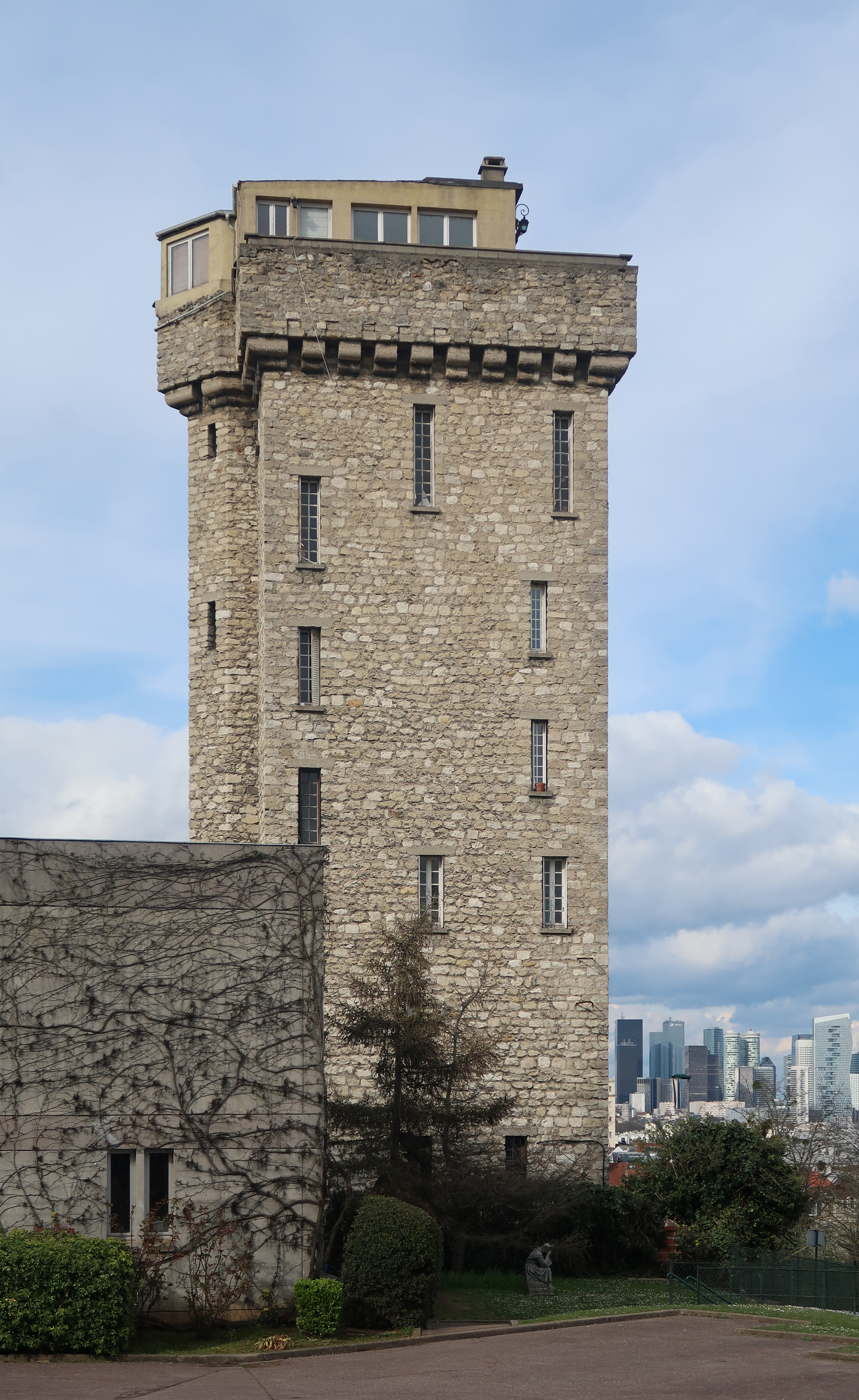
Medieval-style residential tower, built in 1924 on Rue des Raguidelles.

The Second World War interrupted some of Henri Sellier's plans. He planned to build a kindergarten on the southern plateau in the Couvaloux area, Rue de la République, but the conflict put an end to this project. Begun in 1925, a development plan for the Paris region calls for the quay between Suresnes and Puteaux to be widened to 16 meters, the quay between Suresnes and Saint-Cloud to be widened to 20 meters, the Boulevard de Versailles to be widened to 30 meters, the Boulevard Washington to be widened to 20 meters, including 10 meters in the non-ædificandi zone, and lastly, Rue du Mont-Valérien at 10 meters, with a new road starting at the crossroads between Rue Carnot and Rue Merlin-de-Thionville and ending at the entrance to the bridge, thus creating a major new thoroughfare from the bridge to Mont-Valérien, and facilitating traffic flow from Nanterre. To achieve this, the old Saint-Leufroy district, with its narrow streets and cellars, had to be demolished, as did the Jules-Ferry school. A property in Rue Desbassayns-de-Richemont, formerly owned by the farmer-general Parseval de Frileuse, was purchased for the project. Still, the war also indefinitely postponed its demolition, and the building became a retirement home. Sensing that the factories might one day leave Suresnes, either by choice or as a result of the “decentralization of war industry,” Henri Sellier also planned to create a welcoming square with lawns lined with stores and restaurants at the exit of the bridge, in a bid to revive the tradition of Suresnes guinguettes, which were gradually disappearing.

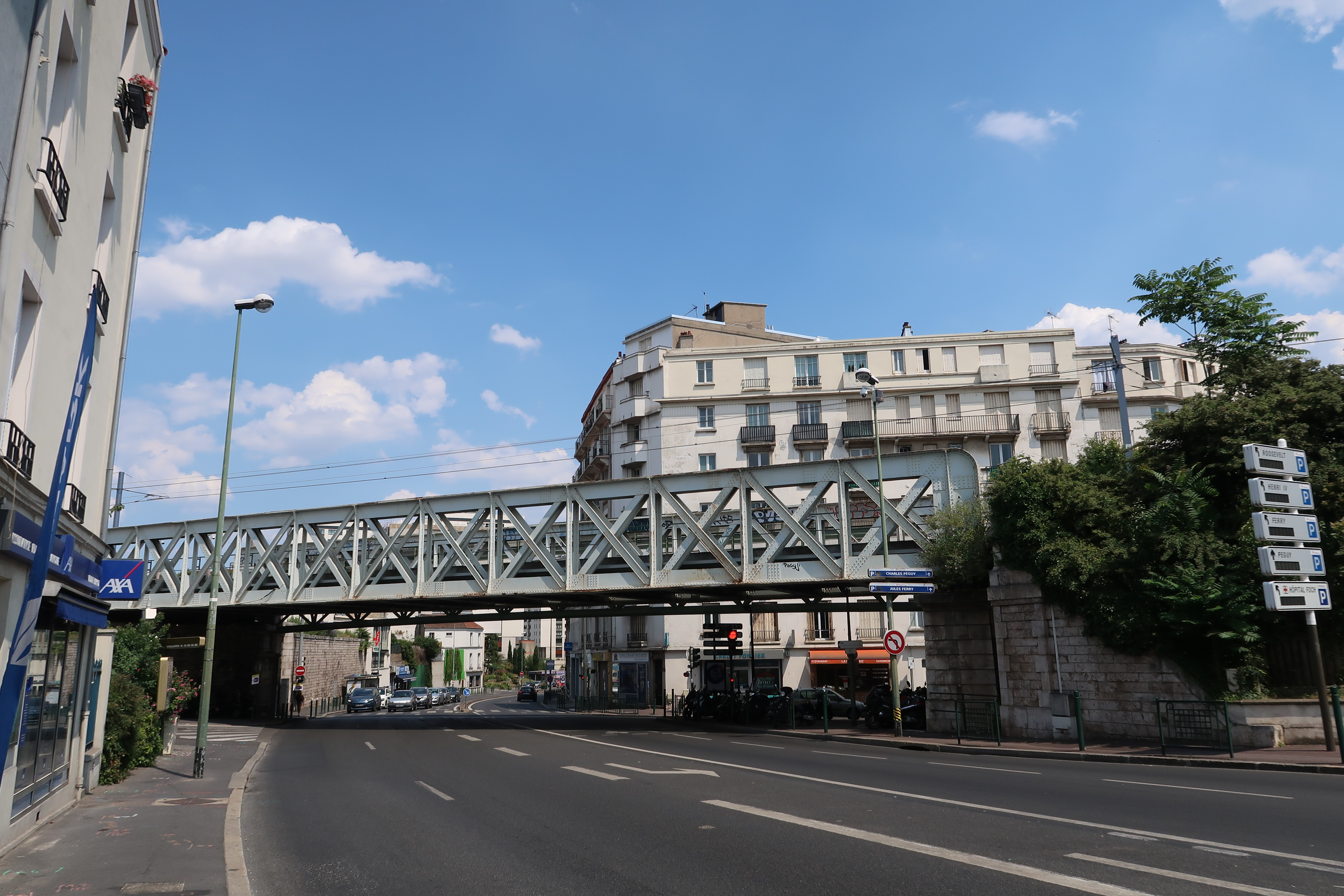
The Boulevard de Versailles, future Boulevard Henri-Sellier, spanned by the Moulineaux line railway bridge.

Following a law passed in 1919, the law of July 19, 1924, required communes to draw up a development and expansion plan. As far back as 1920, the General Council had already prepared projects in line with Henri Sellier's thinking: “It is obvious that a development plan for a suburban commune can only have rational formulas in conjunction with those of neighboring communes.” For Suresnes, this concerns its relations with Saint-Cloud, Rueil, Nanterre and Puteaux. However, this is not intended to call into question the identity of each Suresnes district, marked by geography (industrial near the Seine, residential on the hillsides). In the words of Henri Sellier, the aim is “less to violate than to guide an evolution that has already begun.” The result, however, was the disappearance of old winegrowers' houses and collective dwellings on either side of the bridge, from the Seine to the town hall, along Rue du Mont-Valérien and Rue de la République. A development plan was adopted by the city council on October 30, 1927, confirming old ideas: no longer tolerate unhealthy or inconvenient businesses in the collective housing zone, and regulate building heights to ensure that each side of the street receives plenty of sunlight. In the industrial zone, by contrast, the project calls for the demolition of the remaining dwellings, except where necessary (e.g., for security guards). Finally, in the residential zone, only single-family homes and retail outlets would be tolerated, with dwellings covering a maximum of 50% of each property and not exceeding a certain height to allow for calm, light, and air circulation, and the development of gardens.

==== Hygiene and inter-communal integration ====
When it comes to hygiene, the municipality is heavily involved. As early as 1907, it had drawn up sanitary regulations, but no one was in charge of monitoring them. Worse still, its archives on the subject were discarded in 1918. In June 1921, Henri Sellier set up a hygiene office, applying the law of February 15, 1902, for municipalities with more than 20,000 inhabitants. Its remit included monitoring and surveillance of contagious diseases and vaccinations, surveillance of garrisons in conjunction with the Police Headquarters, creating a file for each building to monitor sanitation and sewage, and permanent medical inspection of schools. The Seine department and the State provide a subsidy. The office also provided services for visiting nurses and future social workers. Nurses were also installed in the two schools of the time, Jules-Ferry and Jean-Macé, and later in the new Plateaux schools.

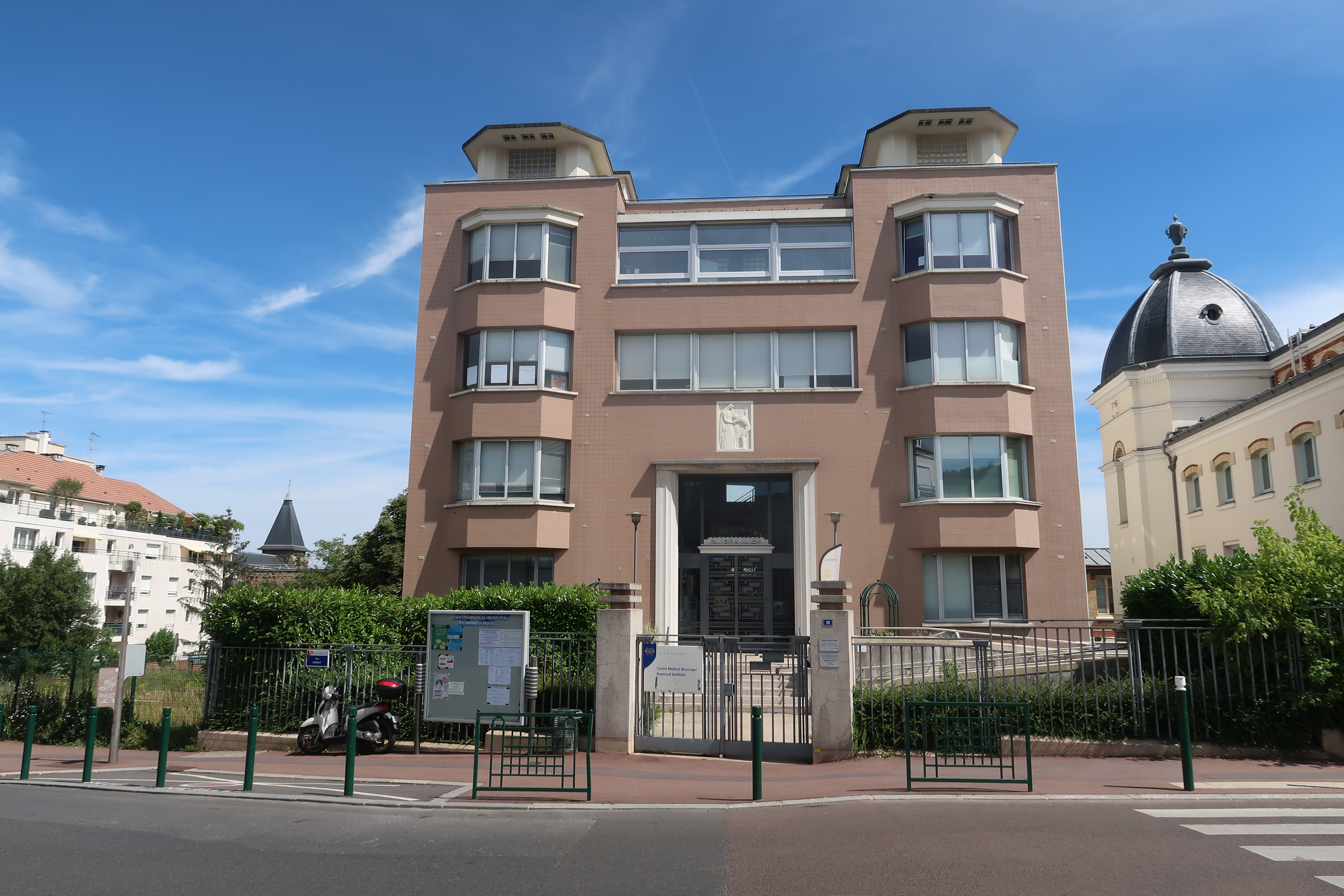
The Raymond-Burgos dispensary, one of the social innovations implemented by Henri Sellier.

Victor Diederich had set up a nursery, but Henri Sellier felt it was more akin to a “children's slaughterhouse.” So in 1924, he decided to build a new nursery and medical dispensary. Land was acquired near the town hall, where the dispensary (now the Raymond-Burgos Medical Center) was built in 1931. It houses surgery, otorhinolaryngology, ophthalmology, neuropsychiatry, and radiology departments. That same year, industrialist Alexandre Darracq bequeathed two million francs to the commune. The sum financed the construction of the nursery, located behind the dispensary, along a street named after him. René Sordes notes that the construction of these buildings placed Suresnes in the vanguard of the hygienic policies of the time: “Suresnes was by far one of the municipalities with the lowest infant and tuberculosis mortality rates.”

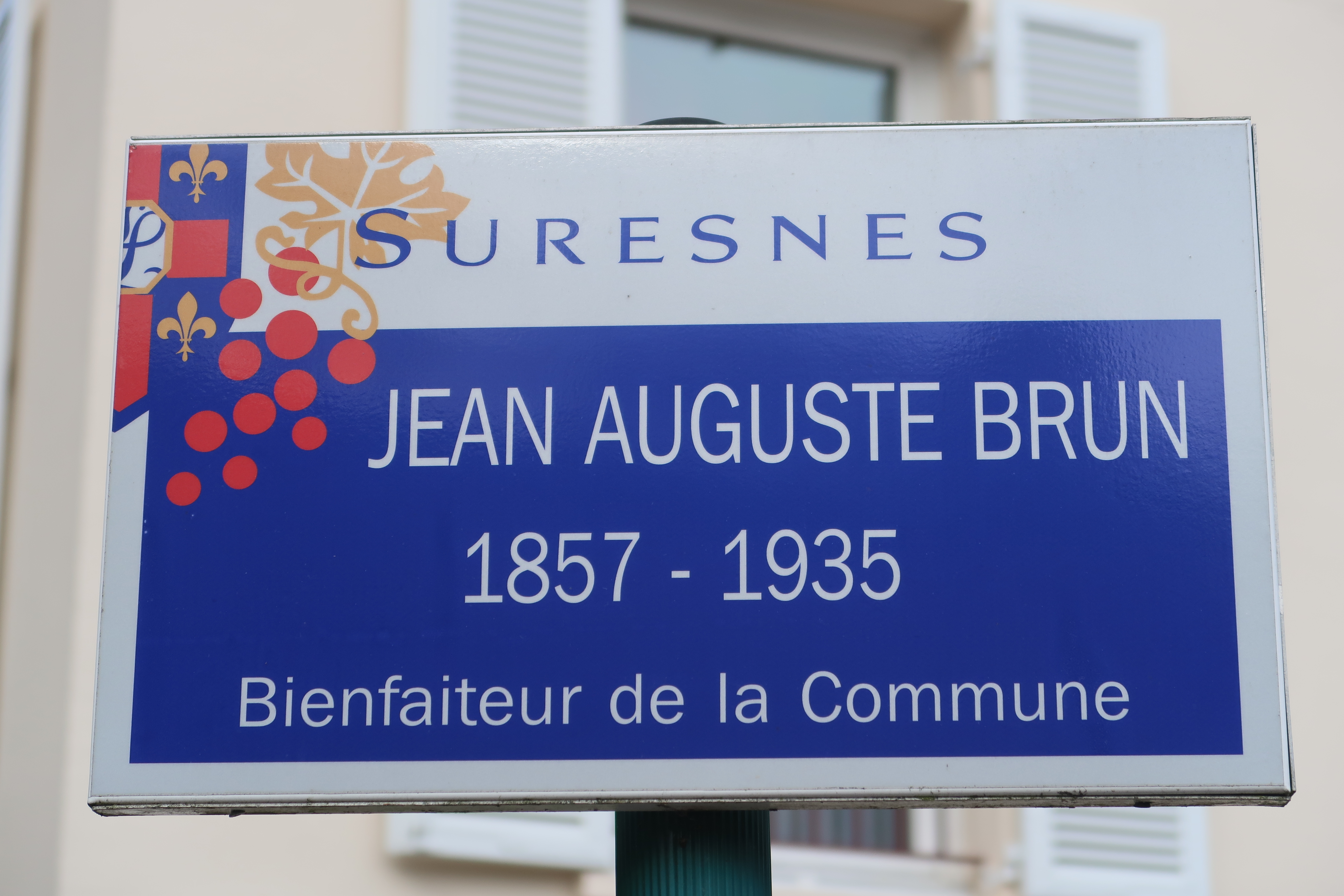
Plaque in tribute to Jean-Auguste Brun, from Suresnes who donated his property to the commune.

On his death in 1935, Jean-Auguste Brun bequeathed his house and garden at 9 Rue des Verjus to the commune, on condition that it be converted into a retirement home or cultural center for the inhabitants of the northern plateau. Henri Sellier planned to build a hospice there, and as Mayor of Suresnes and Minister of Public Health, he applied for a 50% subsidy, although the war delayed the project. The lane between Rue du Fécheray and Rue de Bellevue was renamed after M. Brun.

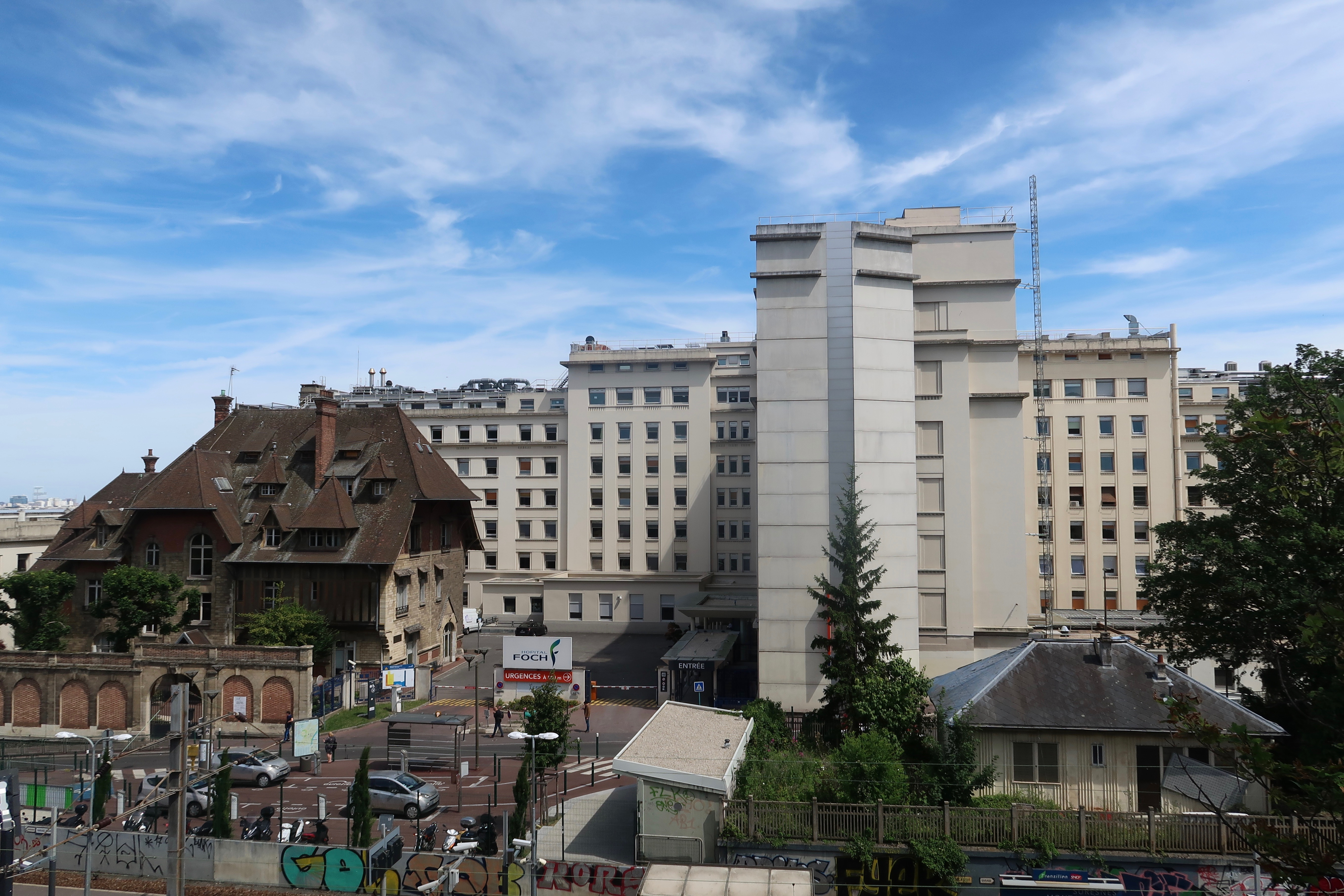
Foch Hospital, the first large hospital built in Île-de-France for the middle classes.

In 1926, the American Bernard Flursheim (in charge of reorganizing the American Red Cross and distributing medical supplies in Europe) asked Senator Justin Godart to set up a clinic for the middle classes in the Paris region, modeled on the one in Boston. Marshal Foch's widow agreed to lend her name to the project. The authorities acquired the former Worth property, and the foundation stone for the hospital was laid on March 20, 1931—the initial project called for 350 beds, with architect M. Fouque in charge. The Foch Foundation had to borrow eight million francs to finance the work, with the commune of Suresnes providing a guarantee for the annuity payments. At the start of the Second World War, the hospital was requisitioned by the French army, then occupied by the Nazis, only to be reopened in 1950.

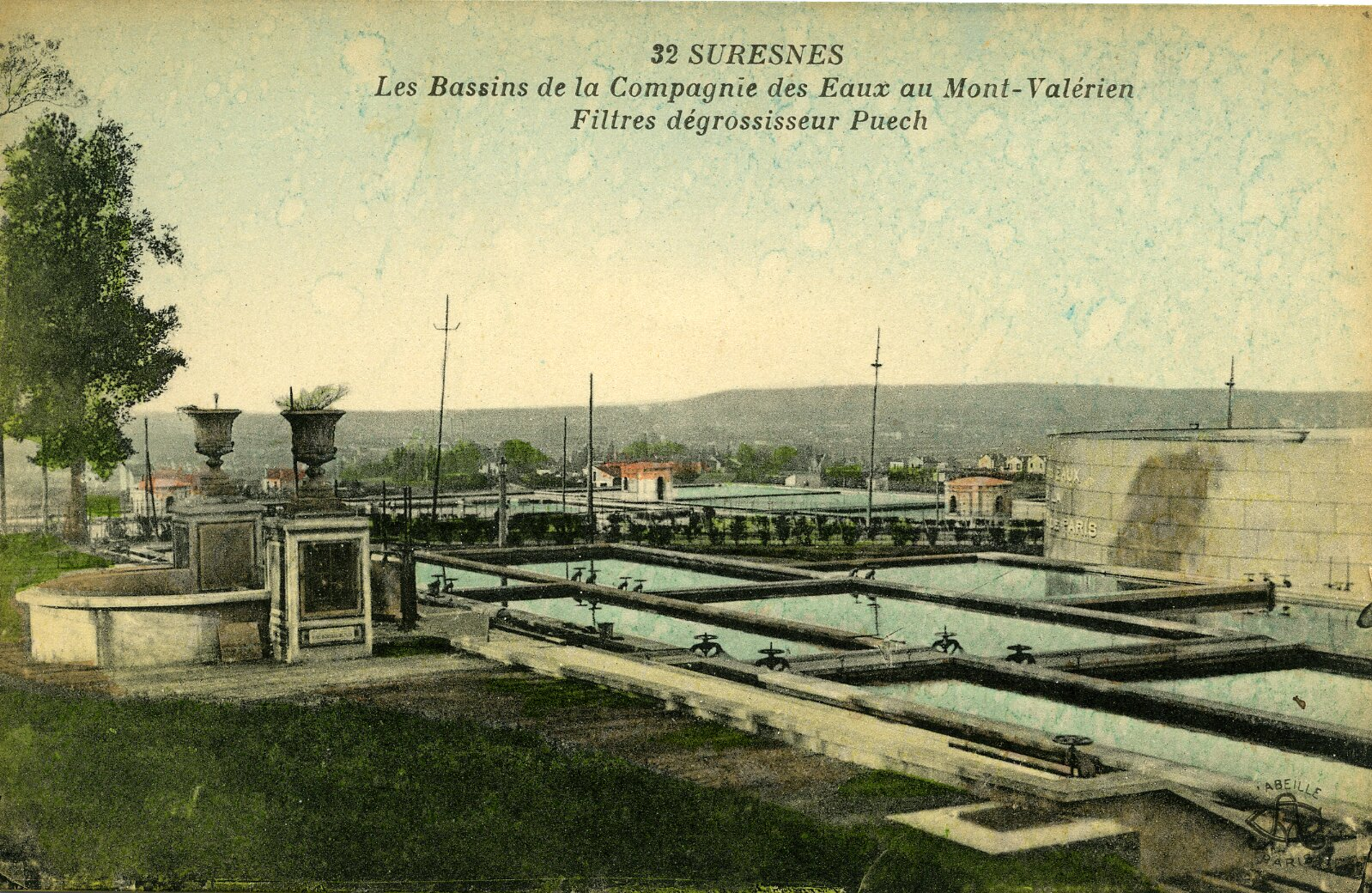
Old image of the Suresnes water treatment plant, one of the examples of cooperation between Suresnes and neighboring municipalities.

Henri Sellier foresaw the metamorphosis of the Paris suburbs, which saw the disappearance of the old villages and foreshadowed the notion of Grand Paris. But while Suresnes had been stubbornly applying for water, gas, and electricity contracts on its own since the end of the 19th century, other communes were already making joint calls on companies. After his election, Henri Sellier asked to join the inter-communal bodies, including the syndicates he had initiated to manage the concession of public services. On August 5, 1920, Suresnes was admitted by the General Council to a concession for the supply of suburban gas between the communes of Seine and Seine-et-Oise, founded in 1903 and until then comprising 55 towns. The town therefore signed a contract with ECFM (Lighting, heating, and power company), replacing the old 1908 contract. Following the prefectural decrees of February 13 and July 4, 1934, the Syndicat des communes de banlieue pour le gaz (suburban gas association) was set up as a public-private partnership. In July 1923, a Syndicat des communes de la Seine for electricity was formed, served by the companies Est-Lumière, Nord-Est Parisien, Ouest-Lumière, and Triphasé-Nord-Lumière, of which Suresnes was a member. In 1923, negotiations took place to ensure that the Compagnie des Eaux would supply water to every street in Suresnes. Against a backdrop of urban development linked to the construction of the garden city, the company built a 1,200 m³ reservoir in the heights of Suresnes, on the highest part of Route Charles-X, which went into service in 1936.

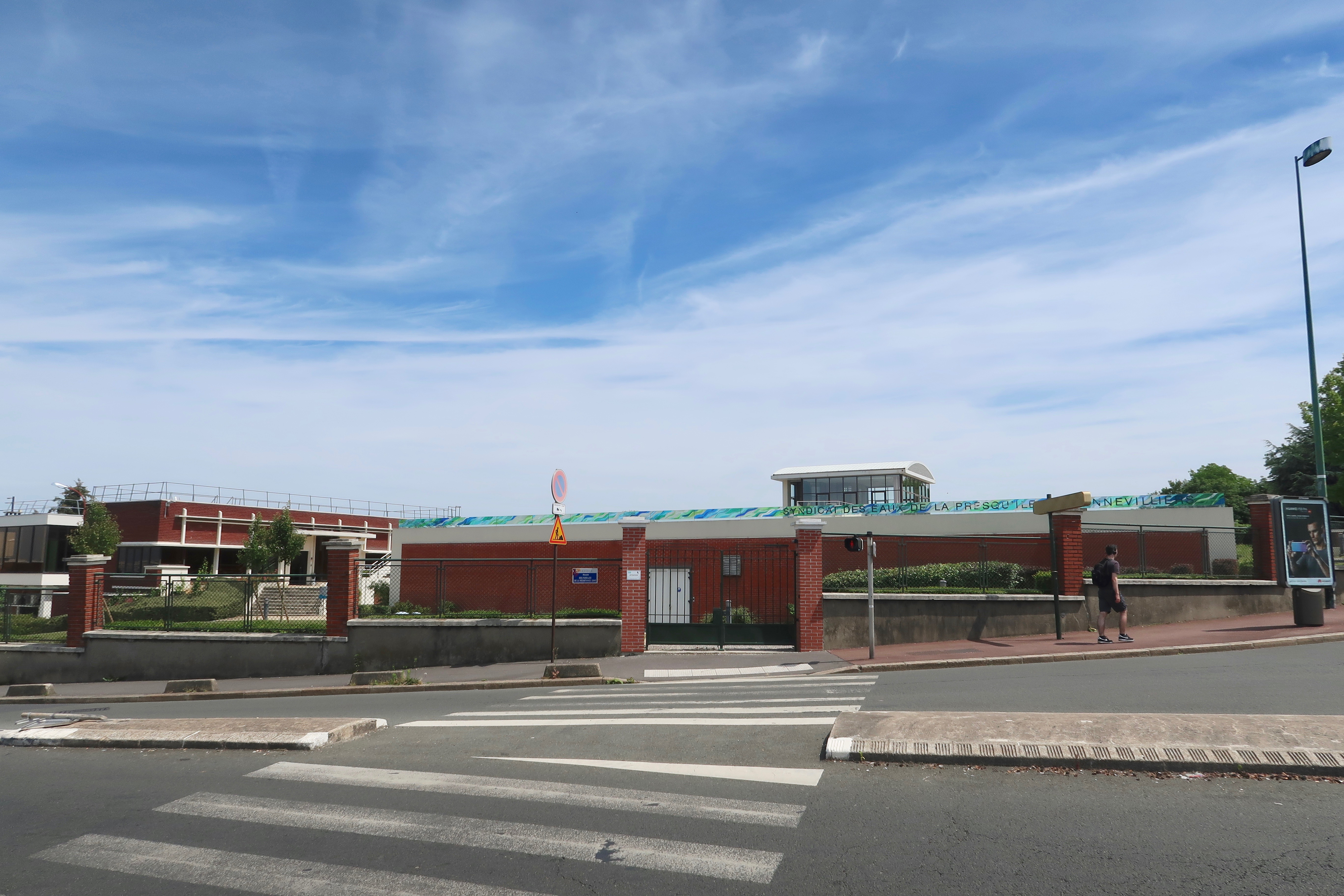
The factory today.

As for household waste, two Nash-Quad trucks from American stocks, followed by three Latil trucks, provided the service, evacuating the waste to agricultural centers, notably Conflans-Sainte-Honorine, which provoked the anger of a farmers' union. In 1926, the Pessard et Joseph company offered to evacuate the waste, with the municipality simply loading it at the Suresnes-Puteaux station. In 1931, the Urban residue treatment company (headquartered at 4 Rue Las-Cases, Paris) offered to incinerate the waste at its Issy-les-Moulineaux plant, to which Suresnes was to deliver it. In January 1933, Nanterre, Puteaux, and Suresnes formed a syndicate on the subject, and, under the law of April 23, 1933, the municipal council entrusted the department with clearing garbage from certain delivery points, with each commune paying a fee per tonne. Although criticism was leveled at the "statist" nature of the establishment of these numerous syndicates, Henri Sellier defended himself: “The aim of the partnership, as we propose it, is not, as has been suggested, to introduce into the operation the germ of whatever statist political conception we are charitably accused of”; Instead, he favors the competence and independence of the organizations involved. For René Sordes, "Sellier is to be thanked for having brought order and logic to the development of a region that unpredictability and incoherence could have compromised for a long time to come".

As he did with the SFIO, Henri Sellier criticized the maintenance of the Suresnes octroi, which he considered a bad legacy of the Middle Ages. However, as the population of Suresnes grew to 20,000 in the early 1920s, the octroi had to change zone, as a decree allowed for an increase in its rate. Henri Sellier had the municipal council vote to increase the octroi tax to boost the commune's finances. In September 1935, however, the mayor pointed out to the government that the octroi system led to tedious checks on cars, recalling a proposal made in January 1933 to standardize the octroi for the Gennevilliers peninsula, which would have resulted in only the south-western limits of Suresnes being monitored. The decree of October 30, 1935, authorized communes to join in a syndicate. In 1937, it united Suresnes and Puteaux, eliminating the octroi between the two towns, followed the following year by Asnières, Colombes, Rueil, and Villeneuve-la-Garenne. The decree of March 27, 1939, completed this action by creating the Syndicat des Communes de la Région Parisienne (Union of Municipalities of the Paris Region) for the granting. This policy of creating syndicates was coupled with financial equalization measures for certain compulsory expenses and for suburban municipal staff, who now had the same status.

=== Sports and leisure ===
==== The 1920s ====
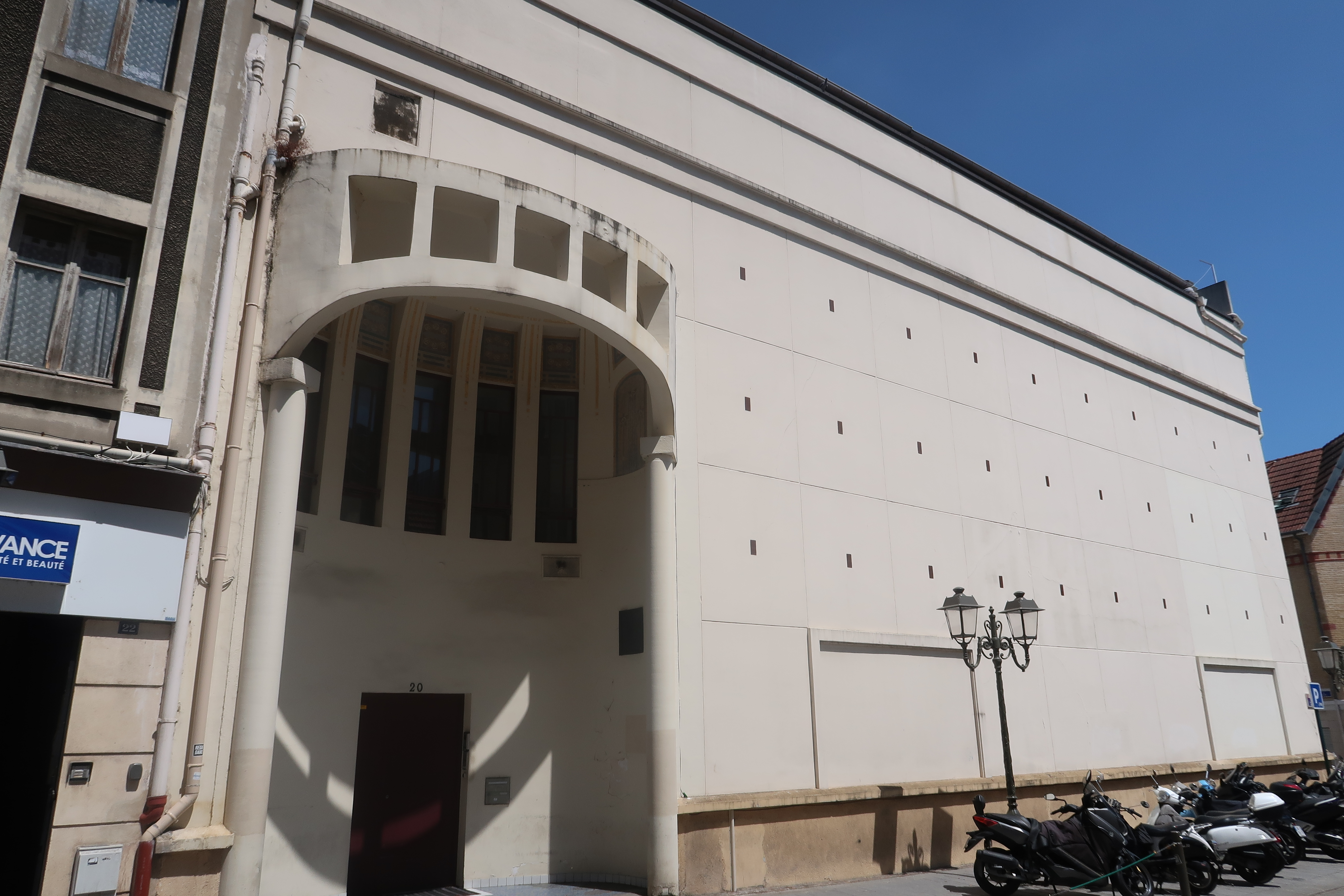
Facade of the former Le Capitole cinema, opened in 1925 and closed in 1985, now the Guillaume Tell studio.

In January 1920, a Comité des fêtes was set up to organize the Salle des Fêtes, with representatives from the participating associations. The same year, the Schwob brothers, who owned the land of the former Meunier factory, were authorized to build Suresnes' first cinema, Le Capitole, on Rue Diderot. At the end of 1920, the municipality created another cinema in the village hall. Between 1922 and 1924, a gymnasium was also built near the former presbytery. The former presbytery building at 43 Boulevard de Versailles became the municipal library, while the former building at Rue Mélin was taken over by the Groupe Banque Populaire. At the beginning of 1926, Henri Sellier had the statue of Émile Zola moved from the Place Trarieux (Note: Current Place du Général-Leclerc.) to the library square, leaning it against the back wall. René Sordes felt that he may have wanted to erase the memory of the partisan demonstration that had taken place. The statue now stands in the garden of the Collège Émile-Zola. In addition to the gymnasium, the Jean-Macé school also houses a fitness room for Suresnes sports enthusiasts.

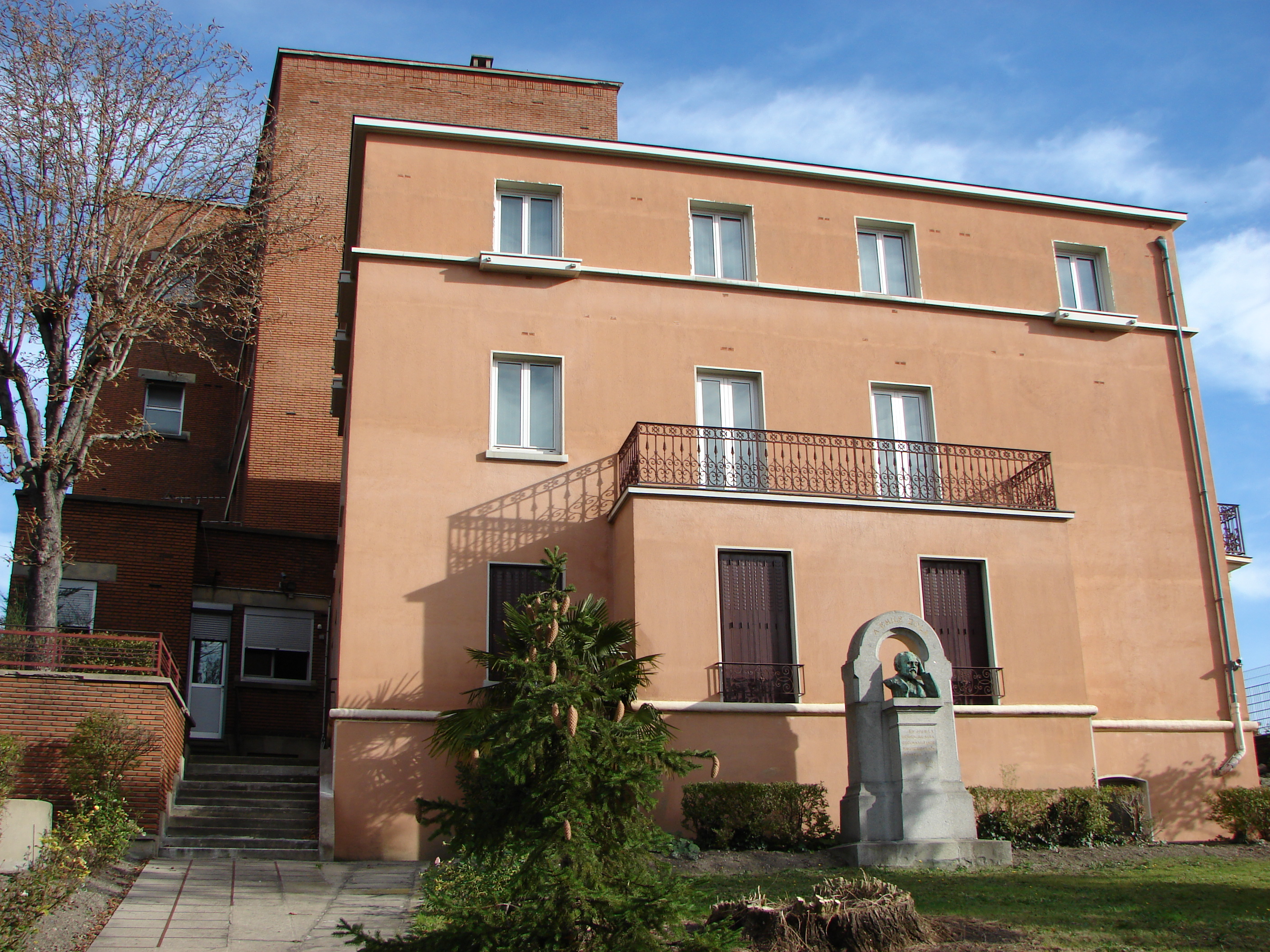
The bust of Émile Zola is located in the garden of the eponymous college, after having been installed on the Place Trarieux and in the square of the municipal library.

In 1924, the town council built raft cabins and diving boards at the end of Rue Frédéric-Clavel for swimming in the Seine, which remained in place until 1929. At the latter date, an agreement was signed between the Comité des Fêtes and Le Journal to build an "Olympic" stand on the left bank of the river, at the end of Rue Frédéric-Clavel, for water sports events. In 1932, another project was discussed but never saw the light of day due to economic problems. The plan was to create a sports facility along the Seine, as well as a beach, between the Avre footbridge and the Suresnes bridge.

In June 1922, the mayor's office considered acquiring land on Rue de la Liberté to develop sports activities in the commune. Still, it was forced to abandon the idea because of the asking price. In July 1930, the Administration of the Seine-et-Oise estates offered the town a 23,700 m² plot of land in Rueil-Malmaison, bordering Suresnes, for 605,000 francs. At the time, physical education was part of popular education. Still, the price of land meant that sportsmen and women could only operate with the support of local authorities or patrons. Suresnes therefore set up a municipal sports office, on which association representatives sat, to deal with questions on the subject, distribute subsidies, and make land available. The land acquired in 1930 was not fully available, however, as a military building still occupied it. The town of Suresnes then invested in other land in Rueil to support soccer, basketball, and tennis, between Rue des Houtraits and Rue Chateaubriand, where a stadium and tennis court were built. The municipality also commissioned architects Beaudoin and Lods to prepare a project for an open-air swimming pool to be used as a skating rink in winter, on the condition that a subsidy from the French government would be forthcoming.

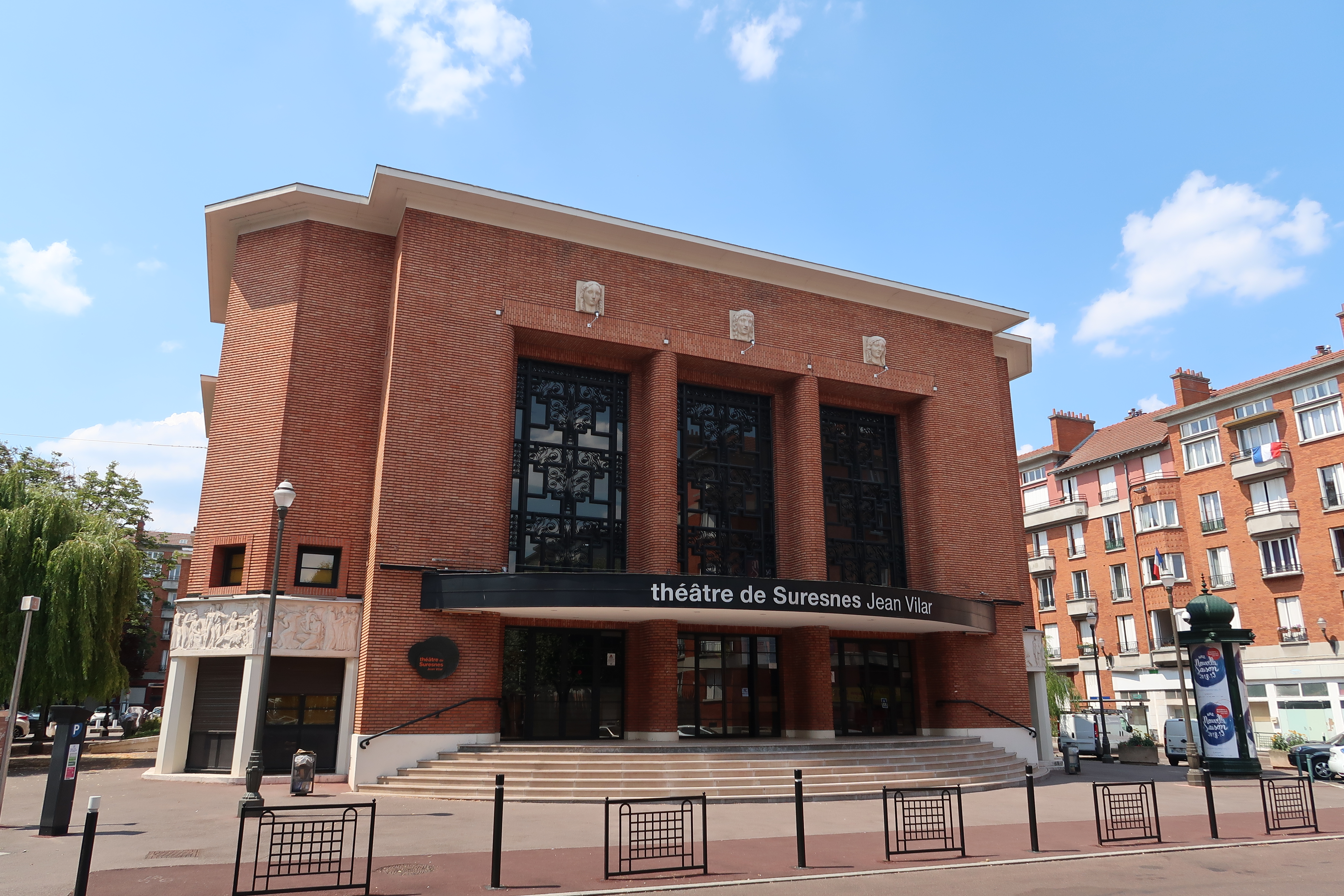
The Jean-Vilar theater (former Albert-Thomas center) in the garden city.

A municipal office also federates associations for popular education. Vocational courses were set up to train and hone workers' skills. Around 1930, communal evenings were even organized, with theatrical outings, educational visits, and lectures. Music and rhythmic dance schools were also set up. Le patrimoine laïque organized nature excursions for teenagers. At 2 Boulevard de Versailles, the municipality acquired the former building housing the Café Ribard (on the corner of rue du Pont) and, in 1931, set up a space on the second floor to accommodate all these associations for their receptions, exhibitions, and general meetings. On May 27, 1938, the Albert-Thomas Center was inaugurated in Garden City.

To carry out all these projects, Henri Sellier's municipality needed a great deal of funding, which led some Suresnois to criticize him, either out of opposition or out of concern for good management. Henri Sellier responded to these criticisms by pointing out that communes did not have the capital to make investments, and, for example, in 1927, an expenditure of 200 million francs at the time cost only one-twentieth of this, thanks to subsidies from the State or the General Council. In 1935, despite the devaluation of the franc and heavy charges, he added that Suresnes ranked only 39th out of 79 Paris suburbs in terms of taxation. The situation worsened after this date due to unemployment, falling growth, and declining octroi revenues, leading to the postponement of certain projects. The mayor covered the deficits with loans. René Sordes is an advocate of long-term investment management for the commune.

==== Festivities ====
The Festivities Committee, created in 1920, aims to “offer the people of Suresnes truly interesting festivities and celebrations, attracting the greatest possible number of visitors to our town by enabling them to attend modern artistic and sporting events of the highest taste,” notes the director of the municipal library, E. Gibbon, recalling the exceptional location and pleasant setting of Suresnes, between the hillsides and the Seine, which had long attracted Parisians. In May 1926, after a grand ball, the people of Suresnes elected a "muse" for the garden city. A funfair, sports, and water sports activities were held throughout the month, in the presence of the free commune of Montmartre and the singers of "La Vache enragée" for the Reines de Paris parade. A fair exhibition is also organized, with stands showcasing the town's activities, from agriculture to commerce and industry. Octave Seron, director of the Cours complémentaire, and collector Xavier Granoux displayed old Suresnes memorabilia with the help of many celebrities. It was a success, leading to the creation of the Société Historique et Artistique de Suresnes (Suresnes Historical and Artistic Society) on July 12, 1926, whose mission, writes René Sordes, is "to organize a permanent museum and to research all things of interest to local history". Octave Seron was its first president. A few years later, it dropped the qualifier "artistic", and the Société des Artisans d'art de Suresnes (Suresnes Society of Art Craftsmen) became a separate institution.

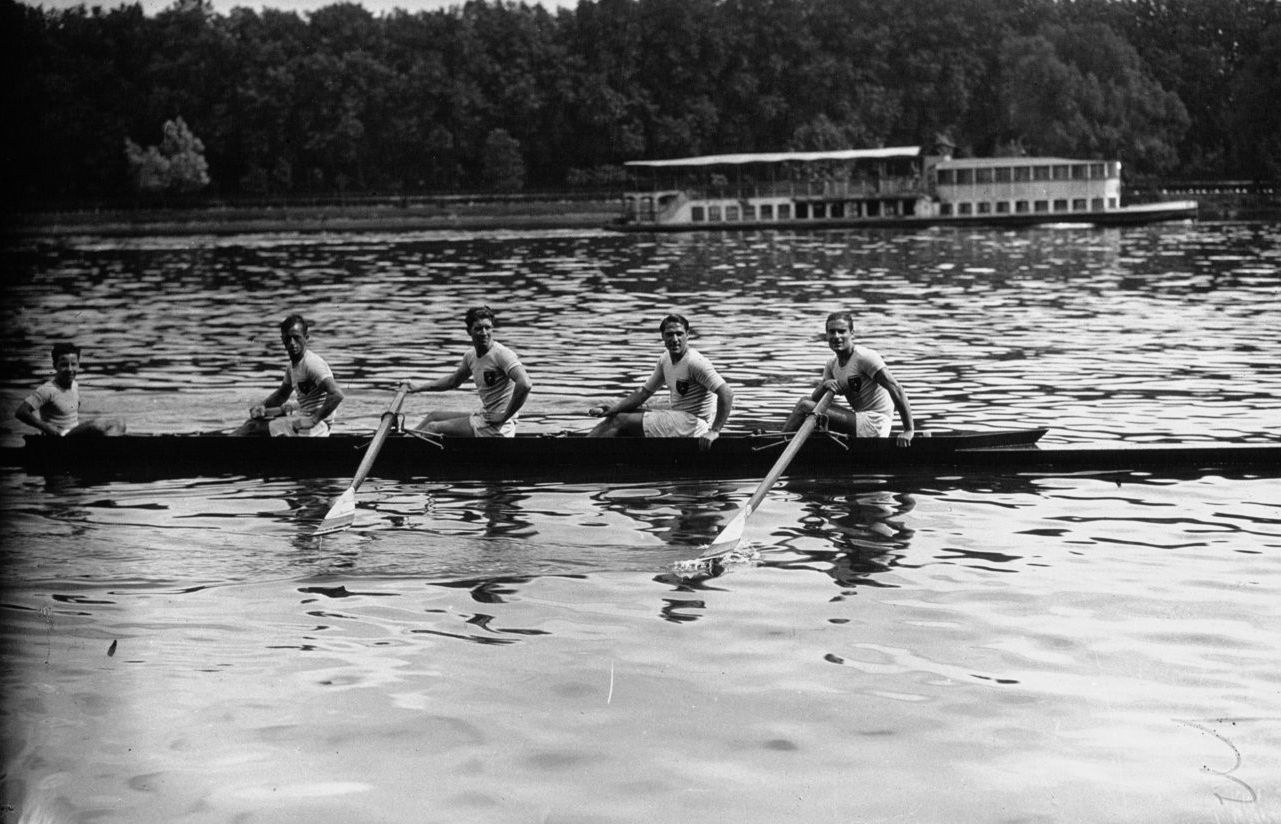
Participants in the 1931 European Rowing Championship on the Seine, in Suresnes.

The following year, still in May, the muse was elected at La Belle Cycliste, at the junction of Rue des Carrières and Boulevard Henri-Sellier, an establishment destroyed by fire shortly afterward. The crowning ceremony takes place on Place du Marché, in the presence of local associations, the Mimi Pinson Conservatory, and its creator Gustave Charpentier. In July, a parade of thirteen floats decorated by local associations is held, with the Historical Society presenting, for example, one, the “Vieille Maison suresnoise,” featuring a hearth and a wine press, with old winegrowers in traditional costume, and another, the “Guinguette,” where bohemians and grisettes dance and sing under an arbor. The Historical Society also organizes a photography competition, "Old and New", which forms the basis of its iconographic collection. Festivities include a music festival, cycling, and pedestrian races, an "international motorboat meeting", and a fishing competition. In 1928, the theme was Charles Perrault's tercentenary and the grandparents' and grandchildren's party. In 1931, the festivities ran from June to September, with the crowning of the Muse featuring performances of old musical tunes in the presence of 400 people. For the occasion, the Comité des fêtes and the Société historique help evoke the history of Suresnes by erecting the towers of the old "Porte de Dessus-l'Eau" at the beginning of Rue du Pont; a well of love is also reinstalled, along with old houses and poternes in the Saint-Leufroy district. Gustave Charpentier also staged a candlelit performance of Dancourt's 18th-century play Les vendanges de Suresnes. In July, a funfair celebrates the fiftieth anniversary of the secular school, while a parade of “cars through the ages” takes to the streets of the town, in memory of Fernand Forest. There are also "grandes fêtes de l'eau" (spear jousts, swimming and rowing championships from France and twenty European countries), balloon releases, night parties, fireworks, and illuminated boats.

==== The 1930s ====
In the 1930s, there were three soccer clubs in Suresnes: the White Harriers, founded by the British Paul Finch, and M. Porteron's FCS (Football Club suresnois), which played in the first division, reached the round of 32 in the Coupe de France and won the Coupe de Paris; the latter team trained on the site of today's Maurice-Hubert stadium, on land rented from farmers. The FCS disappeared in 1939, due to the outbreak of World War II. In 1936, Henri Sigogneau founded Jeunesse Sportive de Suresnes, champions of Paris FSGT in 1937-1938, but disbanded in 1942 after joining the FFF and winning the Coupe du Matin the same year. The team played at Bagatelle. In 1933, the Suresnes Sports Nautiques association was created, with swimmers training in the Seine from a barge in summer and in a pool in a garage in Levallois in winter. Swimming in the Seine was banned in 1961, and it wasn't until 1968 that members of the association could once again swim in Suresnes, in the new Raguidelles pool.

On February 6, 1934, a demonstration took place in Paris, raising fears of an overthrow of the Republican regime. A major popular protest demonstration took place in Suresnes, one of several organized across the country.

In 1934, several cabs joined forces to take passengers from Porte Maillot to Place de la Paix. This was Suresno's first cab service. By 1936, there were 33 drivers. Night owls mainly used it. They disappeared on May 1, 1979, after being roughed up by the RATP and the police, leaving the 244 and 241 buses to run to Porte Maillot and Auteuil.

The coat of arms of Suresnes is inspired by the flag of 1789.

The 1934-1935 festivities were not on the same scale as the previous ones. However, they did see the final adoption of the town's coat of arms, designed by the Société historique using elements of the flag that Bougault had made for the Garde Nationale in 1789. The city council unanimously adopted the new coat of arms on June 18, 1935. The coat of arms reads as follows: "Azure a cross gules, charged in the heart with an octagonal shield argent charged with the letters S and L or [for Saint Leufroy], and cantoned by four fleurs-de-lys or arranged in saltire and often towards the abyss of the angles of the shield". The motto reads: "Nul ne sorti de Surenne qui souvent n'y revienne" (No one leaves Surenne who doesn't often come back). In 1962, the arms were modified, the fleurs-de-lys becoming "en pal" and the municipality chose a reproduction of Bougault's seal for its official papers. (Note: Since then, two bunches of grapes have been added around the coat of arms.)

Following Léon Blum's victory in the May 1936 elections, Henri Sellier was appointed Minister of Public Health in the Popular Front government. Strikes took place, and factories were occupied, including the Coty factory in Suresnes, as well as automobile plants and others. To keep busy, workers organized processions, “sometimes burlesque or comical,” notes René Sordes, or symbolic, mobilizing trucks and cars taken from the factories. This came to an end after the Matignon Agreements.

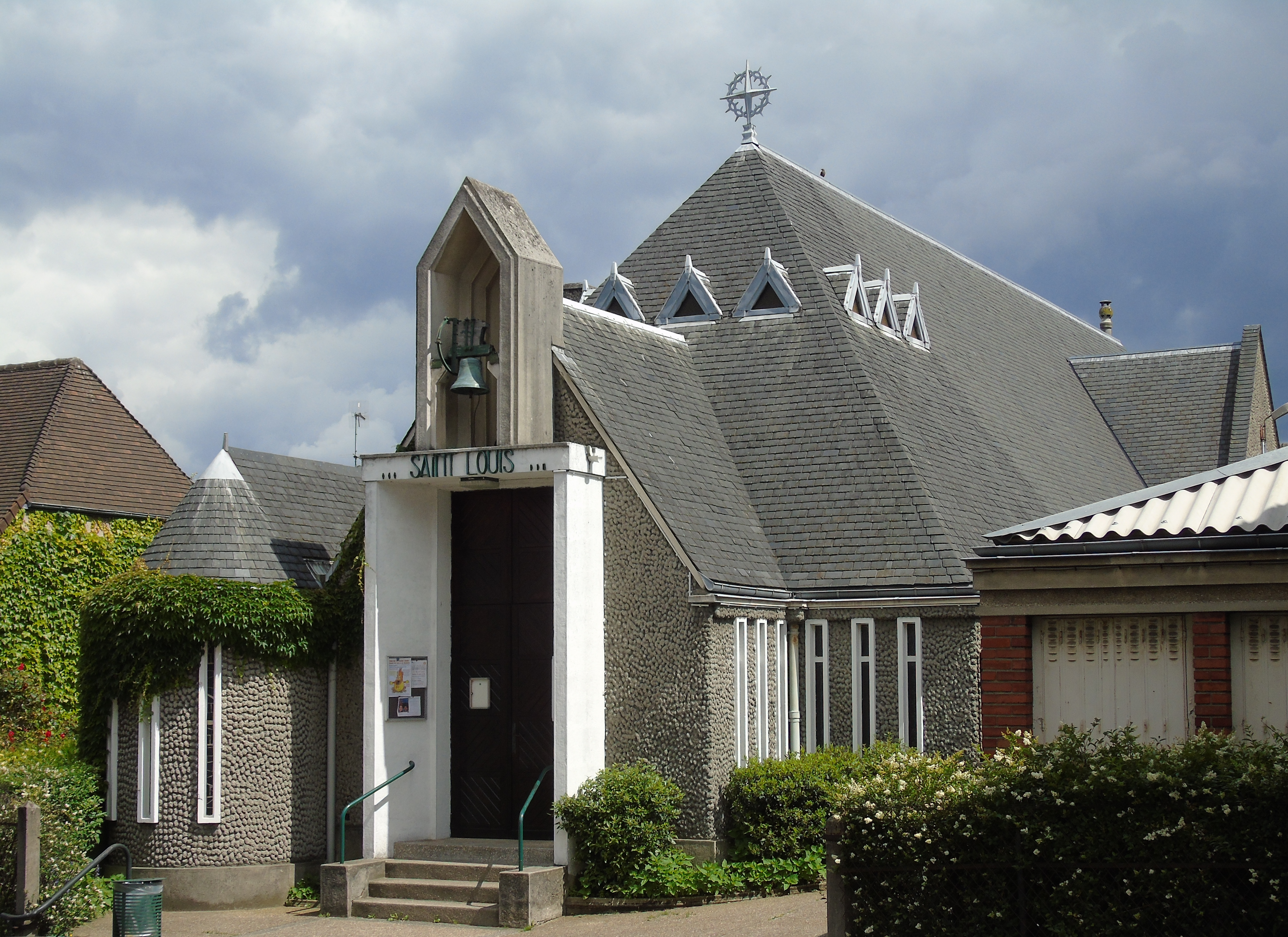
The Saint-Louis chapel was built in 1938 for the inhabitants of the northern plateau.

Exhibitions were held in the municipal foyer. In 1936, the Société organized "Suresnes ancien et moderne", a forerunner of the definitive museum. The latter was planned, but the war postponed it. In 1937, the exhibition focused on “The Vine and the Winegrowers.” In 1935 and 1939, the Société des artisans d'art de Suresnes (Suresnes Society of Art Craftsmen) also presented exhibitions; this association disappeared after the war. In 1938, a Midsummer bonfire was held on the Fécheray terrace, thanks to a collaboration with the Paris Folkloric Society. Between 1935 and 1937, Suresnes also hosted the French rowing championship, the Lyon jousts, hydrofoil and aquaplane races, international regattas (London Rowing Club), rowing competitions organized by the Société Nautique de la Marne (Nautical Society of the Marne), and the Oxford-Cambridge. In 1939, for the 150th anniversary of the French Revolution, celebrated by the Republic, the Société Historique organized “veillées communales” (communal evenings). At the Landes estate, children from Suresnois schools performed shows recounting the history of the Revolution. A tribute was also paid to Bougault, and a plaque was placed on the building on Place Henri-IV, where his house was located, which was also the first town hall. Thanks to old documents and the curator of flags at the Musée des Invalides, the flag and costume of the Suresnes National Guard were reconstituted before being presented at the municipal museum. Sometime later, war broke out. Due to the conflict, several works were temporarily halted, such as the road linking Nanterre to the new bridge then under construction (now Avenue du Général-de-Gaulle), and resumed in 1950. Work on the bridge, begun in 1938, slowed down and then stopped until 1947, and was completed in 1950.

Evoking the western suburbs of Paris, marked by the geography of the Seine, writer Louis-Ferdinand Céline wrote, following the boats passing on the river from his belvedere in Meudon: "From my attic, I can see her name, her number, her laundry to dry, her man at the helm... I point, the way she takes the arch of Issy, the bridge... you're passionate, you're not... you're gifted for the movements of ports, rafts, dock traffic, and dams [...] Look at this panorama! The hills, Longchamp, the grandstands, Suresnes, the loops of the Seine... two... three loops... at the bridge, right up against it, Renault's island, the last clump of pines, at the tip". In Henri Calet's La Belle Lurette (1935), the narrator thinks of a friend who had committed suicide, and whose body had been fished out of the sea between Suresnes and Puteaux, helping to build the dark imagination of the Parisian suburbs. As for Raymond Queneau, he has one of his characters say in Loin de Rueil (1944) that the inhabitants of this town don't go to Paris, but prefer to go to Suresnes for moules-frites.

René Sordes concludes these more than a thousand years of municipal history with a few words about the future: “Suresnes was once a charming end of the world, where people came to be entertained or to rest; nowadays, people pass through as quickly as possible. And yet the foliage of the Bois de Boulogne, the Seine, and its magnificent waterway, the charming banks of the river, Mont Valérien, and its crown of greenery make it one of the most pleasant districts in Greater Paris. Let's hope that urban planners will take this into account when drawing up their projects, and allow a few picturesque cabarets, welcoming restaurants, and even pleasant hotels to survive or be reborn. Then people will once again be able to stop off in our town, and the charming old saying 'No one leaves Surenne who doesn't often come back' will remain our motto despite everything."

== World War II ==
=== Drôle de guerre and German settlement ===
On August 24–26, 1939, the government ordered the men to rejoin their regiments amid rising tensions. On the 28th, the Suresnes municipality began preparations for the exodus of the town's children to the provinces, which began two days later, to the Sarthe, a place designated by the prefecture but against the advice of Henri Sellier, who protested on June 13, 1940, against “the anarchy and lack of common sense that characterized the evacuation of the children,” even though the town already had a colony in the Nièvre. While the majority of young Suresnois joined the Sarthe, a group from the outdoor school was sent to the Henri-Sellier colony in Hossegor.

Before the outbreak of the war, the Ministry of the Interior had set up the so-called “passive defense” organization, the aim of which was to entrust volunteers with the services normally provided by the Police Headquarters, which would be mobilized by other issues and thus dispersed. This service works in coordination with the fire department. This includes organizing and monitoring shelters, encouraging people to go there, distributing protective equipment such as gas masks, operating darkening lights, calling for help in the event of a serious incident, and assisting with clearance after destruction. Suresnes was then divided into twenty "îlots", each headed by a civic guard, one of whom died during the first bombardment to hit the town. However, the guards had few resources and limited room for maneuvering during the Occupation, as the Germans were wary of them. At the Liberation, they organized police operations in conjunction with the FFI-FTP.

In May 1940, the Germans invaded France, prompting numerous air alerts. On May 20, a bus bound for Normandy from Chimay passes through Suresnes, loaded with refugees. 16 ambulances also took many wounded to the Foch hospital. The town council had flown the Belgian flag over the town hall, but “following the betrayal of King Leopold III” (who decided to surrender after the dazzling German breakthrough into Belgium), recounts Jean Becker, who is finishing René Sordes' book, the municipality lowered it to half-mast.

On June 3, 28 bombs fell on Suresnes, the sirens going off ten minutes after the explosions. (Note: Six fall on Rue des Cottages and Rue des Bartoux, one on the Suresnes-Puteaux freight station, five on Rue Michelet and Rue de Keighley, four on the Carnot cemetery and the Rue d'Eponymous, two on Place du Marché and Rue des Bourets, four on Rue de la République, three on the fort of Mont Valérien, one on Boulevard de Versailles and two on Rue de Verdun.) Two civilians and an island guard perished, and many houses were destroyed or damaged, including the town hall (doors, windows, and partitions were ripped out, and the glass roof over the central staircase was destroyed). This led to its temporary relocation to the Jules-Ferry school, where the unemployment, prisoner, and food services (ration cards) were particularly busy during the conflict. The marriage hall was moved to the Justice of the Peace auditorium. It wasn't until 1945 that the town hall returned to its original location.

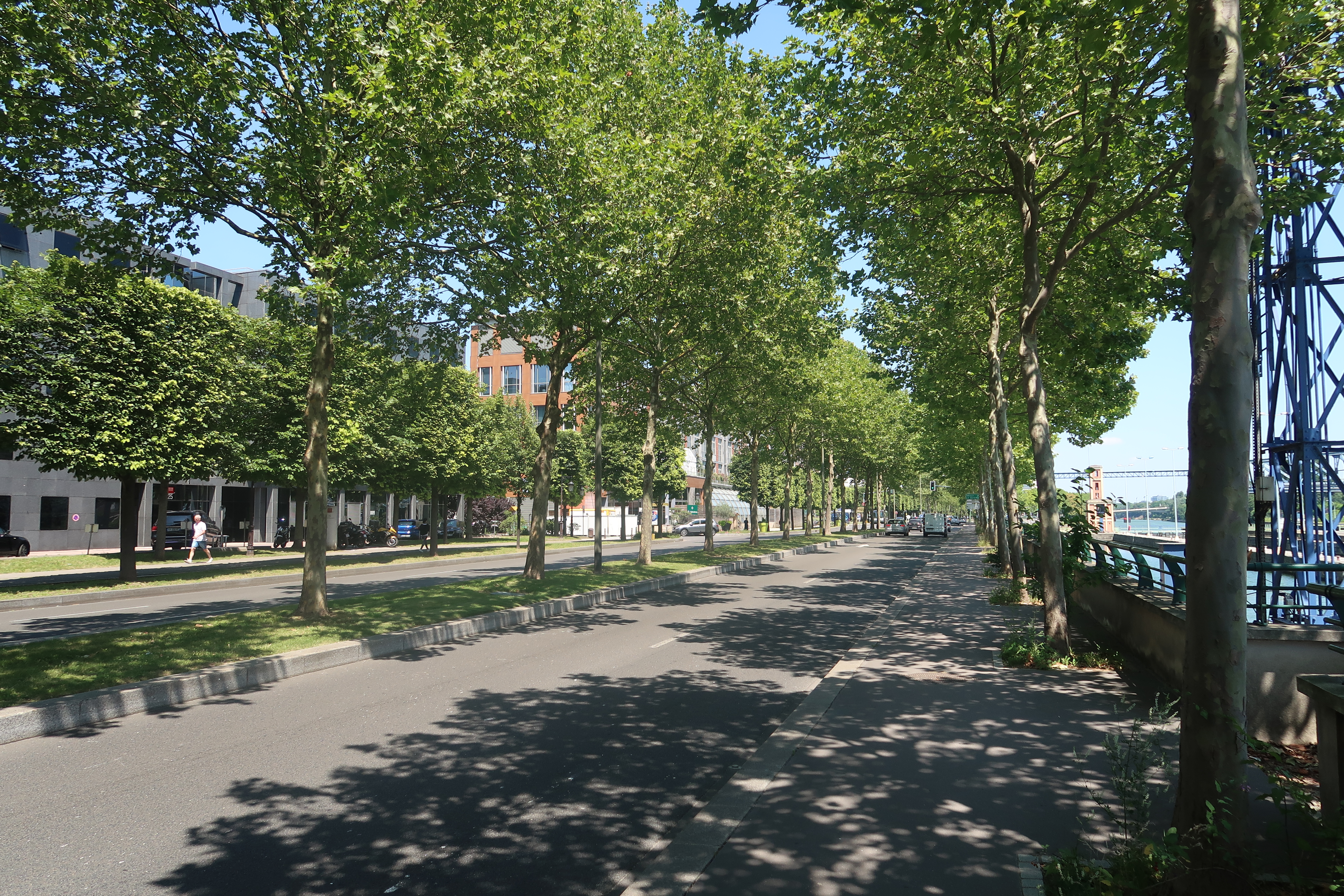
Quai Gallieni, where people from the Paris region leave on their exodus route.

The exodus of the French took to the roads, fleeing the advancing Germans. Using a variety of means of transport (train, car, bicycle, even on foot with a wheelbarrow), they headed west and southwest, taking the Quai Gallieni in Suresnes or the Boulevard de Versailles, widened in 1938 after the trees lining it had been felled. The resulting chaos led some to turn back. Factories also left Suresnes, bound for the provinces. On June 13, Henri Sellier put up a poster advising the people of Suresnes not to leave, stating the municipality's objective: “Collaboration exclusively dominated by the concern to safeguard the interests of the population and to minimize suffering, difficulties, and clashes, but in no way to encourage maneuvers that could undermine national defense.” On the same day, the doctors and soldiers working in the Foch hospital left the building; the wounded in the hospital were henceforth cared for by doctors in Suresnes. On the 14th, the Germans entered Paris, and the armistice was signed on the 22nd. The city began to experience difficulties with supplies, particularly food, as Henri Sellier worked to prevent the looting of abandoned stores.

On June 24, at 9:30 a.m., the first German presence appeared in the form of a sidecar arriving via Rue du Bac. The pavilions surrounding the fort were occupied, as was the Radiotechnique building on Rue de Verdun. A few days later, the authorities asked Henri Sellier to proceed with requisitions, in particular of the pavilions and buildings in Rue de l'Hippodrome, Rue de Montretout, Rue de la Criolla, Rue de la Tuilerie, Rue du Fécheray, Rue du Bel-Air, and Rue de Bellevue. The mayor must also accompany two German generals to open the fort and the meteorological service premises. On July 21, German formations 22-499 and 25-501 arrived in Suresnes, along with the Kommandantur, and took up residence at 19 Rue Pierre-Dupont, in a factory that used to print race tickets (and which in the 1960s housed the Blanchet perfumery). The training offices were located at 33 Rue Pierre-Dupont and 43 Boulevard de Versailles in the municipal library. As for the German horses, they were housed on Rue de Verdun, in the stables of the Watelet company.

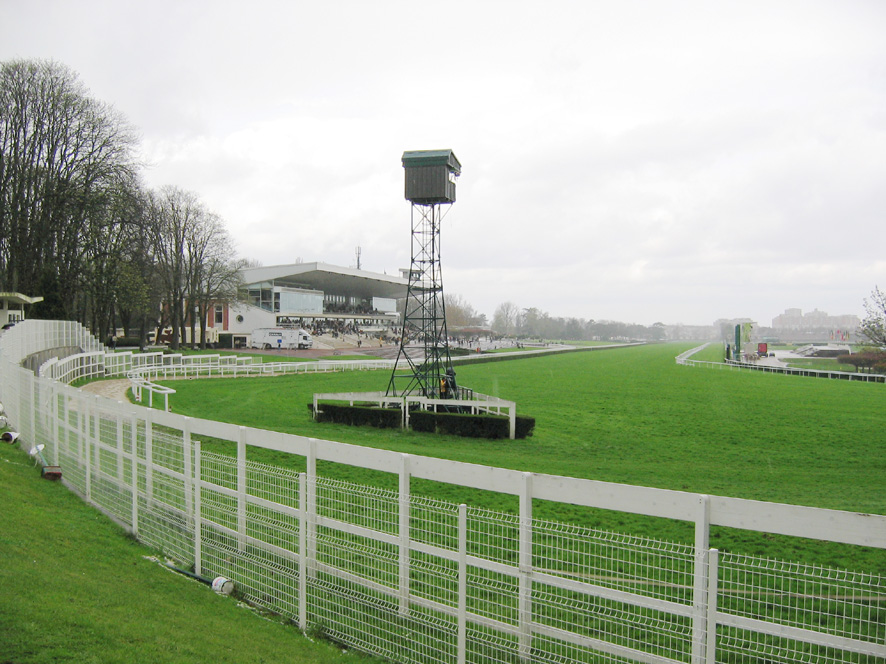
German troops are stationed at the Saint-Cloud racecourse (photo from 2007).

A German colonel seized airline plans from the offices of the Compagnie Aérienne Française on Rue de Nanterre (now Rue Honoré-d'Estienne-d'Orves), where he had worked before the war. He returned several times, notably during the African campaign. In August, the Bois de Boulogne guards are evicted from their accommodation and relocated. Hauptmann von Furstemberg is appointed commander of the Suresnes square. His lodgings were at 17 Rue Desbassyns-de-Richemont, then transferred to no. 48 for an annual rent of 16,000 francs, after Major Hafner had replaced him. The Suresnes Kommandantur was solely responsible for maintaining law and order, with administrative matters (requisitioning buildings, contractors, etc.) devolved to the Courbevoie Kommandantur, headed by Hauptmann Heindel. The town was responsible for billeting German troops at the Saint-Cloud Racecourse, where light artillery and SS formations were stationed, as well as a Luftwaffe staff company and a radiotelegraphic intelligence unit. The formations were able to hire Suresnois for quartermaster jobs (laborers, cooks, etc.), controlled and paid by the town hall, with passes issued by the army. A German officer, whose grandfather had fought in the 1870-1871 war, was concerned about finding out what had become of the Valérie artillery piece and managed to have it repatriated to Berlin.

In June 1940, the German health services moved into the Foch hospital, where they remained until January 1944, when they were transferred to the Raymond-Poincaré hospital in Garches, which was less likely to be bombed. The Garches staff then came to work at the Suresnes hospital. As the white hospital was particularly visible, the Germans had it repainted green by their camouflage services. Exterior ladders were also installed at the windows to enable rapid evacuation of the building. During the war, the Foch Foundation received several million francs in compensation for the occupation of the buildings. The writer Ernst Jünger was treated there in 1942. From August onwards, the Mont Valérien fort was successively occupied by various units (infantry, DCA, artillery, and Luftwaffe), who were only passing through. At Val d'Or, the garage of the former Compagnie du chemin de fer du bois de Boulogne (Bois de Boulogne Railway Company) was occupied by motorized troops, who were then sent to the Russian front on May 30, 1941.

=== Occupation ===
Food shortages began in April 1940, but it was not until October that ration cards were introduced. Passenger rail transport, suspended at the start of the Occupation, did not resume until July 1, 1941, with only one train per hour. Bus 44 A (Cité-jardin-Pont-de-Neuilly) resumed service earlier, on August 30, 1940. With gasoline in short supply, Suresnois resorted to alternative fuels, installing coal-fired gas generators on utility vehicles. Gas stored in roof-mounted balloons enabled buses to run on municipal gas. Horse-drawn carriages and bicycles are once again widely used. There is now only one postal delivery a day.

In October 1940, Solidarité suresnoise, an association under the patronage of Secours National, was set up to distribute aid. A month later, it was helping 5,000 unemployed people and distributing 8,000 relief items. At the same time, 600 Suresnois were prisoners of war, and 200 families had taken refuge in the city. While some households were able to resort to the black market, move to the countryside, or rely on relatives there, this created an imbalance for the less well-off, prompting Solidarité to organize occasional food distributions.

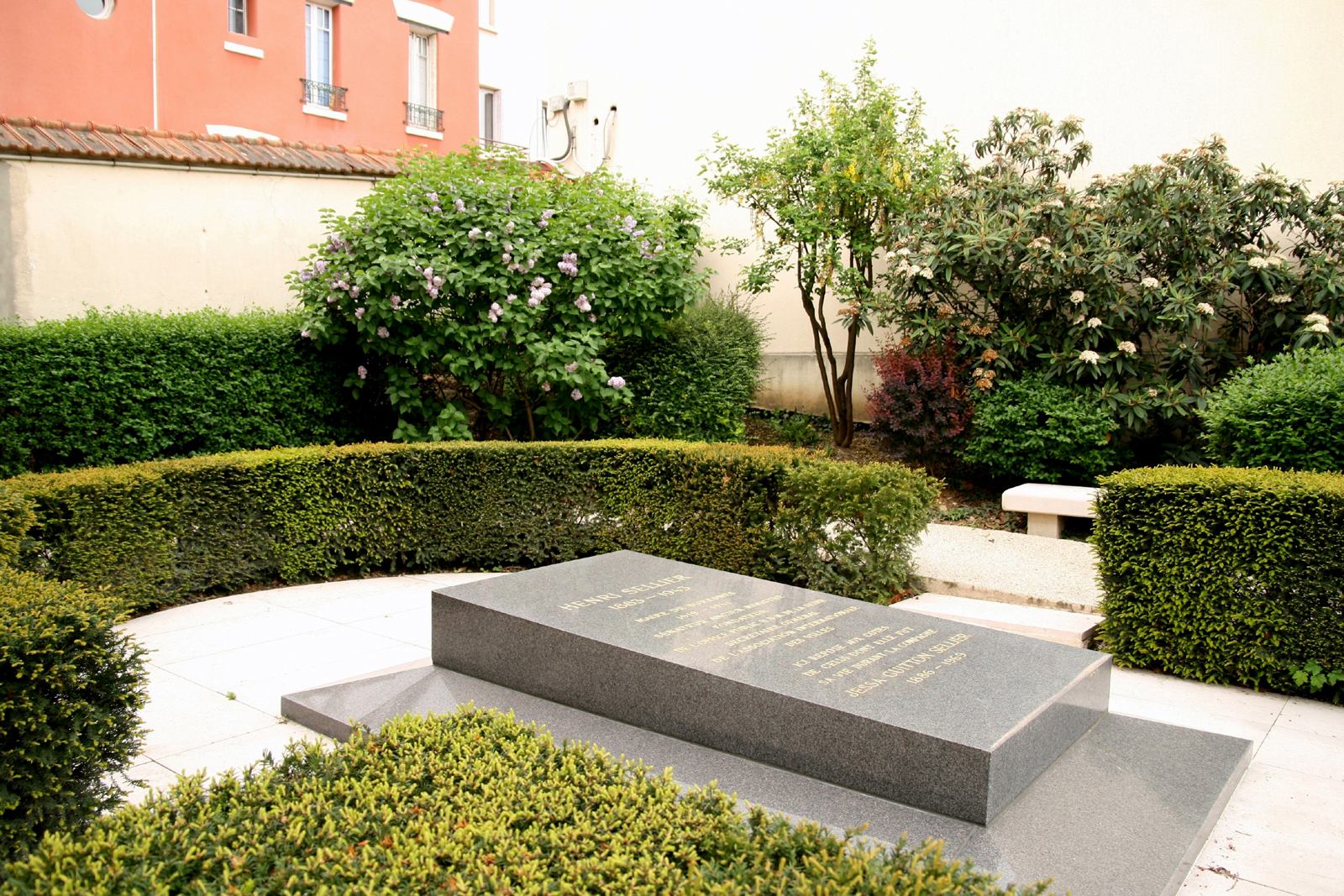
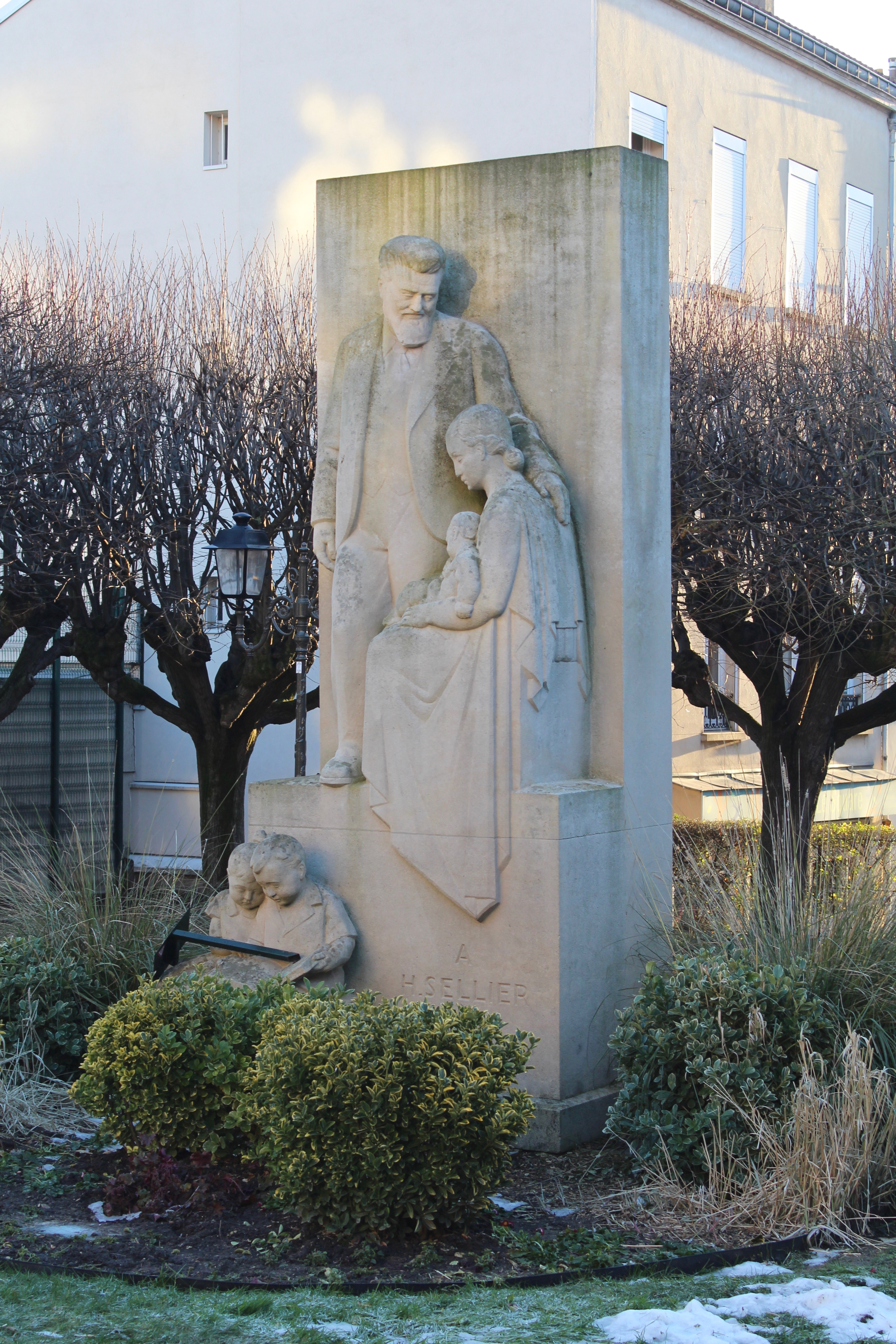
Left: Tomb of Henri Sellier in Carnot Cemetery.
Right: Monument to Henri Sellier, erected in 1962 in the town hall garden.

On May 20, 1941, Henri Sellier was dismissed by Vichy, the decree signed by Admiral François Darlan stating that he had “shown manifest hostility to the work of national renewal.” In his office, the mayor had posted this document, adding a quotation from Maximilien de Robespierre: “Hatred of the people's enemies is the reward of good citizens.” On June 5, 1941, Louis Cucuat, Inspector General of Administrative and Financial Services at the Seine Prefecture, was appointed mayor by ministerial decree. On June 22, Henri Sellier was arrested and interned at Compiègne, before being released and returning to Suresnes on July 17. But these events, and the fear of further arrest, affected his health. On November 1, 1943, he suffered an attack of hemiplegia and died on November 24. He is buried in the Carnot cemetery.

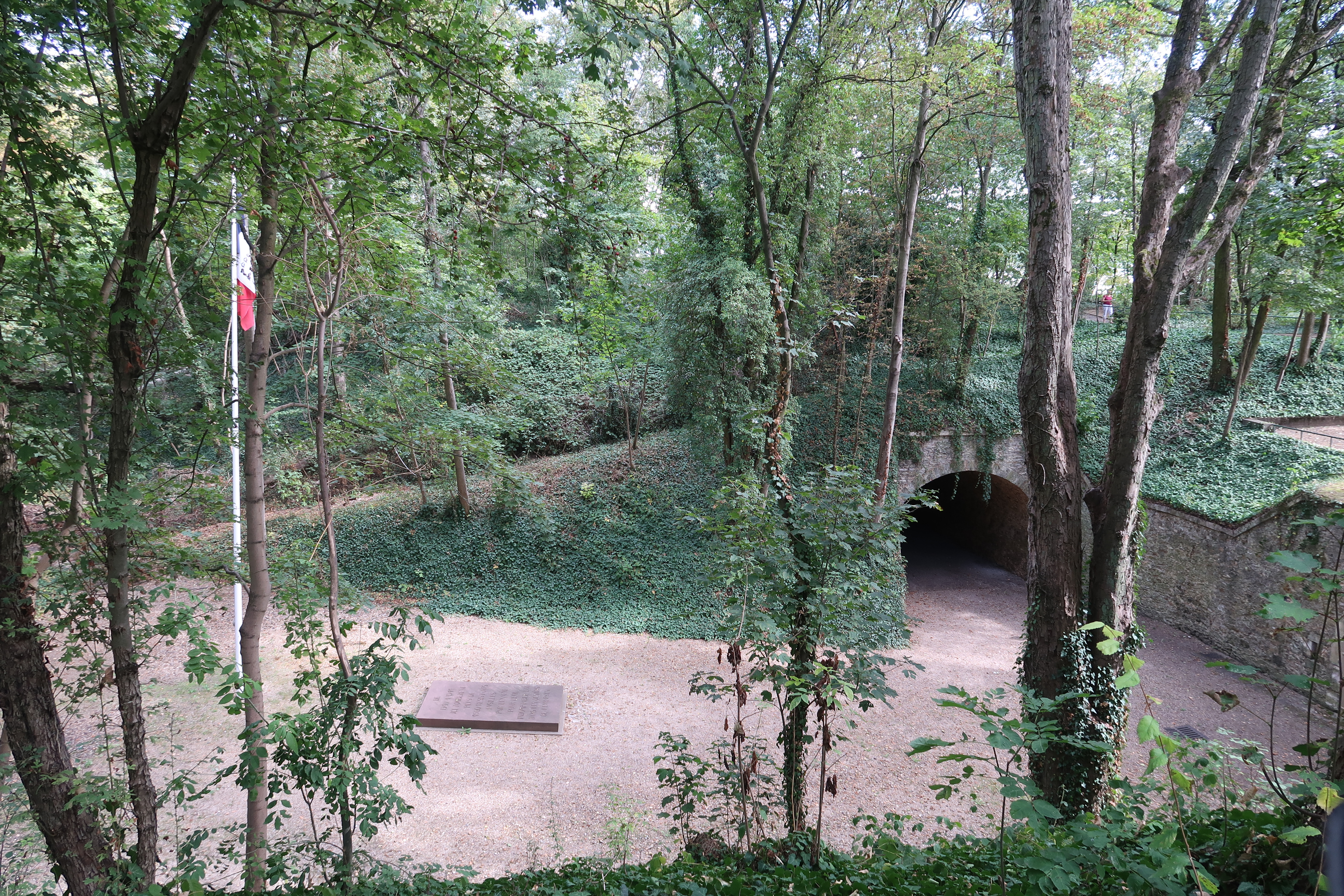
The clearing of the executed.

In 1941, the Germans chose Mont Valérien to execute resistance fighters in a clearing in the forest surrounding the fortress. On the eve of their death, some waited in the chapel of the former Château de Forbin-Janson, which still bears graffiti of the condemned on its walls. German priest Franz Stock assists those condemned to death. On August 29, Honoré d'Estienne d'Orves and his companions were among the first martyrs of the Resistance to be killed there. Five students from the Buffon High School were also executed there on February 8, 1943. Their bodies were then sent to cemeteries in the Paris suburbs, particularly Ivry-sur-Seine. Mont Valérien was a hotbed of the French Resistance and saw the execution of some 1,000 resistance fighters until 1944. After the Liberation, they were honored by the naming of several Suresnois roads: Route des Fusillés de la Résistance, Avenue Gabriel-Péri, Rue Jacques-Decour (formerly Rue des Verjus, where this Resistance fighter lived), Rue Georges-Appay and Rue Marcel-Monge (Resistance fighters living in Suresnes, shot on August 11, 1942), Rue Claude-Burgod (drawing teacher at Suresnes technical college from 1931 to 1942, resistance fighter deported to the Flossenbürg concentration camp, where he died on March 21, 1945), Rue Émilien-Collin (Suresnes resident who died in deportation), and Rue Georges-Appay (a mechanic living in Suresnes who was shot in 1942). Noor Inayat Khan from Suresnes, a British secret agent with the Special Operations Executive (SOE), died in the Dachau concentration camp; a square in the town center and a plaque in front of her former home pay tribute to her.

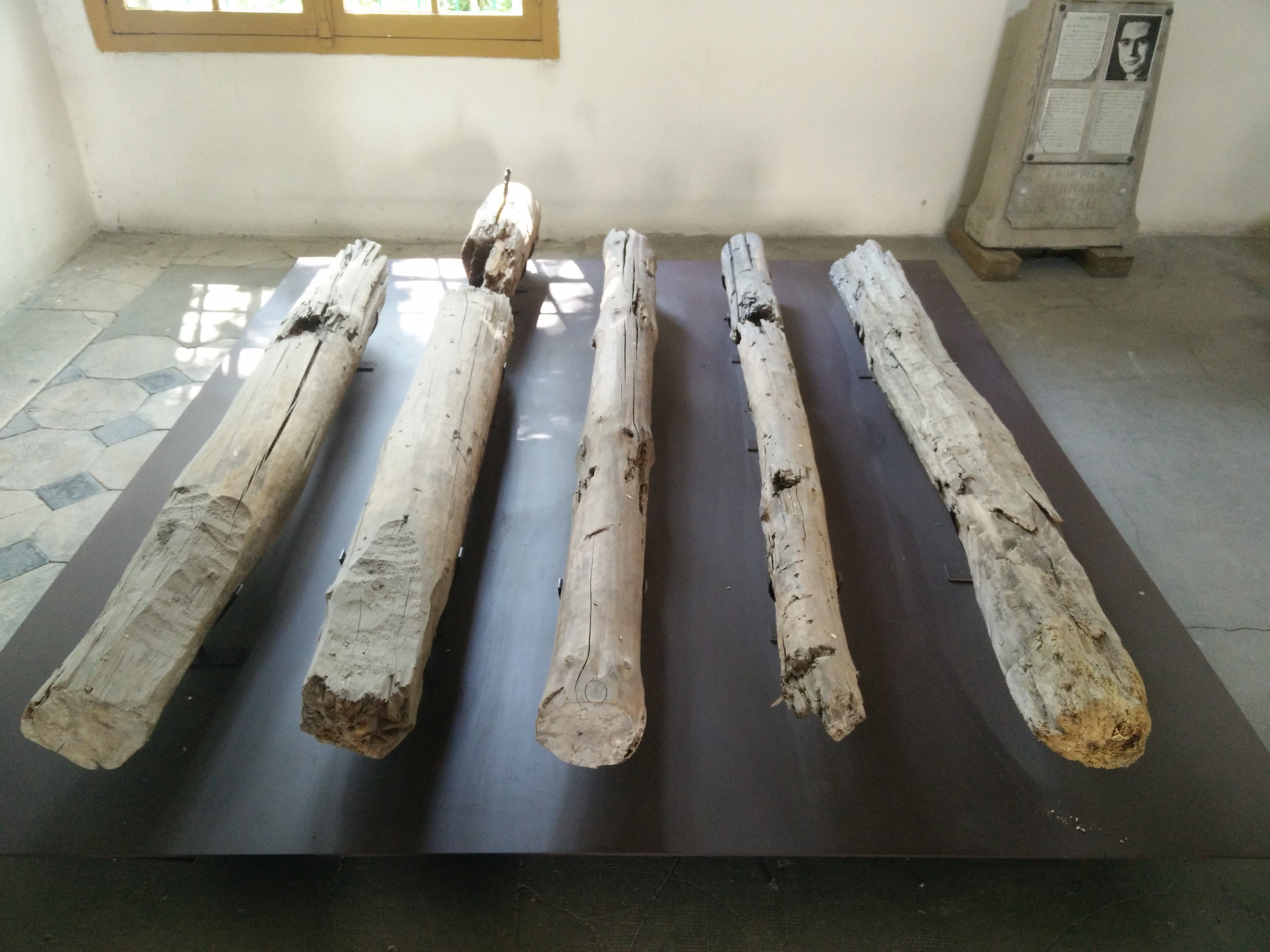
Execution posts displayed in the chapel of Mont Valérien, where some of those condemned to death waited.

In 1941, some prisoners of war returned to Suresnes, first fathers of large families, then veterans of the First World War. On October 4, the Minister of the Interior dissolved the Suresnes municipal council and replaced it with a special delegation chaired by Louis Cucuat, which included André Bertrand, Henri Maleyx, and Louis Briquet. On November 4, Louis Cucuat was appointed mayor of the 20th arrondissement of Paris, and replaced in Suresnes three days later by André Bertrand.

On the night of May 29–30, 1942, a British bomber destined to destroy the Renault factories in Boulogne-Billancourt was blinded by searchlights and strafed by flak, inadvertently dropping its missiles on the Garden City on Avenue de la Fouilleuse. Thirty people were killed, and several were wounded. The following day, the head of the French government, Pierre Laval, visited Suresnes to pay tribute to the victims.

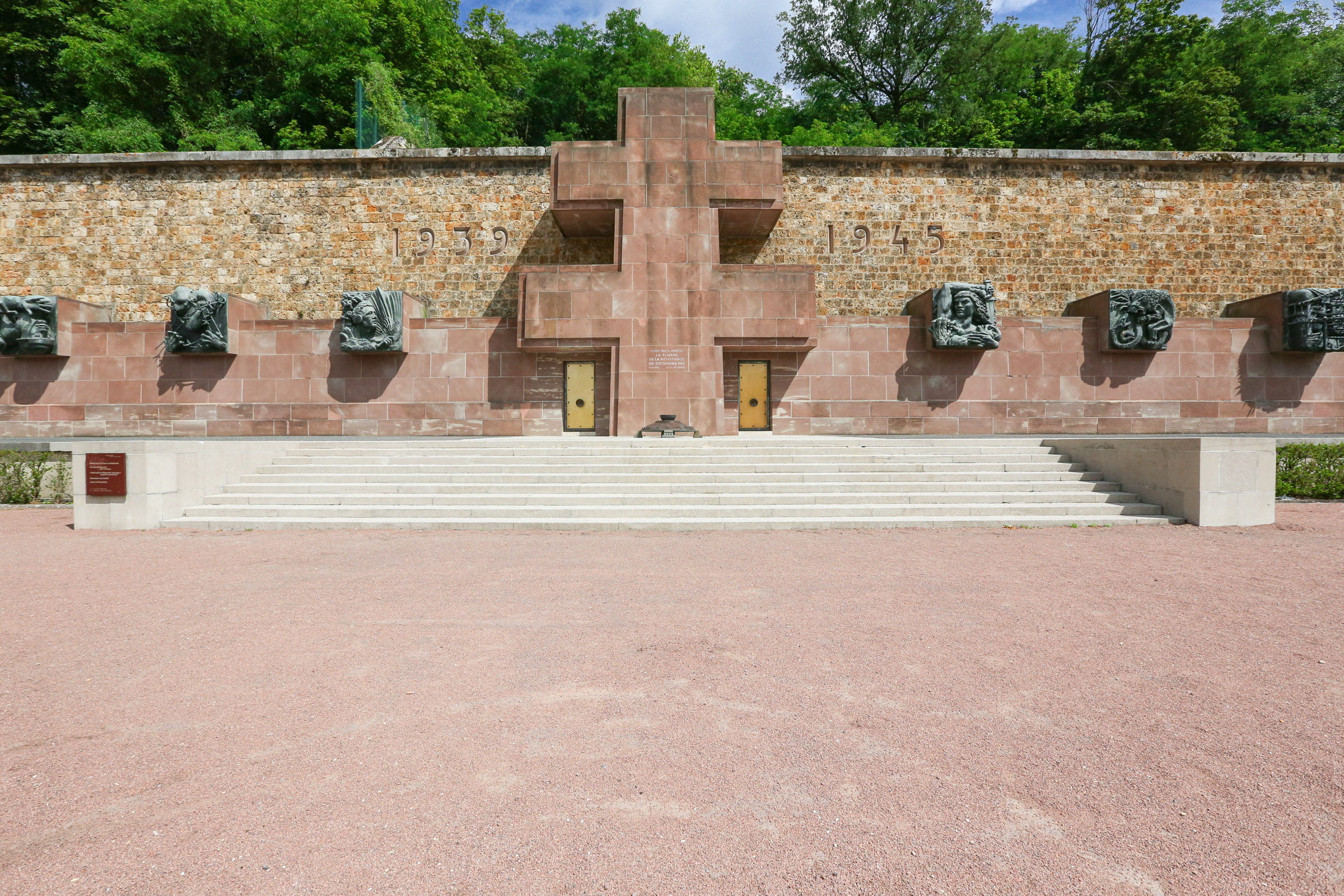
Memorial to the Fighting France, inaugurated in 1960 by General de Gaulle.

The "Relève", or STO, was set up to send workers to Germany, in exchange for the release of French prisoners. On October 2, 1942, the census of Frenchmen deemed suitable for this task began. Propaganda was rife, for example, in Le Petit Parisien on November 30, 1942: "The young mechanics' center in Suresnes, a breeding ground for up-and-coming specialists. Suresnes, a stone's throw from the guinguettes, the quai de Puteaux. To the strains of a marching song, a group of young apprentices, in columns of three, in black jackets and pants, leave the factory. Voluntary discipline, a spirit of solidarity, and a sense of duty are the laws of the community. After three months' training, the young people leave for Germany as specialists; after a further three months' work in a German factory, their commitment will be valid for the next shift."

On Sunday, April 4, 1943, as the Longchamp racecourse reopened, it was bombed by Allied aircraft, targeting the anti-aircraft guns installed on the racecourse, which retaliated, but one of their guns was hit. Aviation bombs then fell on the racecourse, killing six people and injuring numerous walkers and turf enthusiasts. Thirty members of the Suresnes emergency teams went to the scene with the Red Cross to assist with the rescue, taking the wounded to the Foch hospital in horse-drawn carriages. Bombs also fell in Suresnes. (Note: Two between the Maison de Santé and Rue de Saint-Cloud, two on the Coty factory, which caused a fire, one on Quai Galliéni, between the old and the new bridge and one on the old bridge, on the Bois de Boulogne side: it was cut off for a time but renovated in a few days with a wooden footbridge for cyclists and pedestrians.) There were no casualties in the town center, but many shop windows were smashed. Other bombs fell in the woods.

"Emergency teams", rescue groups staffed by stretcher-bearers and first-aiders to support bombing and evacuation operations, were set up in early 1942 at the advice of the Paris branch of the French Red Cross. The Red Cross had a local committee in Suresnes for some time, chaired by Madame Lecomte. Mrs. Canova and Metton head the Suresnes teams. While the Red Cross provides some medical supplies, we have to rely on donors to supplement our equipment. After the events of April 4, 200 male and female volunteers were registered and trained by a team of 10 people. Specialist teams were also set up, and with the help of companies, they cleared bombed-out buildings. The Bernard-Moteurs and Électrification Nouvelle plants enabled one unit to supply electricity to the affected neighborhoods, while another unit transported the teams to the disaster areas. An office was set up at 6 Rue Émile-Zola, and a former mansion on Rue Fizeau (now the post office) was used for training exercises. At the beginning of 1944, there were 365 volunteers. In addition to the bombing raids on Suresnes, teams from the town also helped out after the bombing raids on La Chapelle, Courbevoie, Villacoublay, and Saint-Denis. Another team helped with food supplies: after buying produce from vegetable fields, they brought it back to Suresnes and distributed it among shopkeepers and emergency teams. During the Liberation of Paris, while some members of the emergency teams were taking part in the fighting, the supply team brought flour back to Suresnes, and one of its members was wounded by bullets. The team made its final contribution after the German air force bombed the Batignolles district of Paris. Members of the emergency teams also joined the 2nd AD and the 1st French Army. They were disbanded after the armistice.

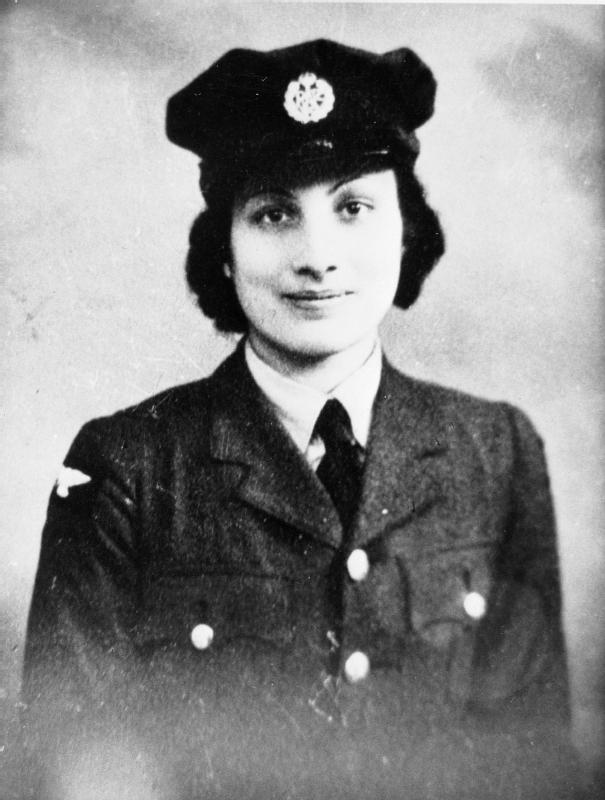
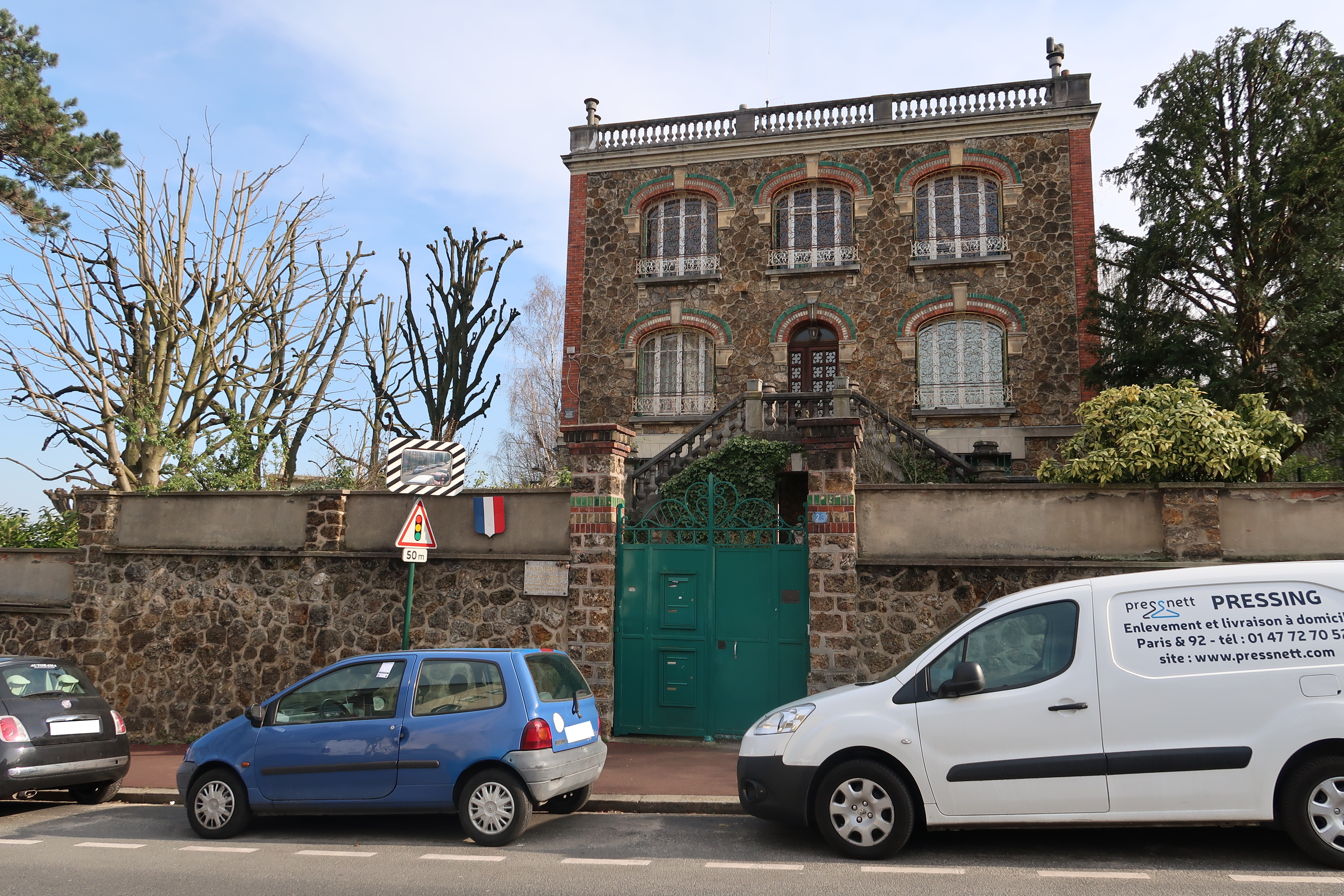
Left: Photograph of resistance fighter Noor Inayat Khan.
Right: Her house at 23 Rue de la Tuilerie, where a plaque honors her memory.

In the French Resistance, the movement with the most members in Suresnes was the Libération-Nord network. Its role was mainly to hinder the German war effort by paralyzing factories or passing on information. However, as the factories in Suresnes did not represent a major strategic interest, they were not the target of spectacular sabotage as in some neighboring communes. At the time of liberation, volunteer resistance fighters were integrated into the FFI and FTP; there was no fighting in Suresnes, but some resistance fighters took part in police and clean-up operations. Other Suresnois collaborated by showing their support for Marshal Pétain: some received small coffins or threatening letters framed in black, signifying the death that awaited them when the Allies arrived. At the time of the Liberation, some collaborators from Sures were put on trial, but the penalties were measured, and none were sentenced to death.

From the start of the war, factory activity had been reduced due to a lack of workforce and raw materials. Some relocated part of their activity to the provinces. On their arrival, the Germans exercised control over the remaining companies, with the allocation of raw materials being carried out by the Professional Organization Committees. Few factories, however, changed their mission, apart from the former Blériot factory, now known as SNCASO, which manufactured Junkers 2, and the Morane-Saulnier workshops, which built small Fieseler reconnaissance aircraft that took off from the Longchamp racecourse on a specially prepared runway. While Radiotechnique continued with its usual production (electronic tubes and Radiola receivers), the Occupying Forces also commissioned it to design special aircraft for night flights, and one of its workshops was mobilized to repair Telefunken aircraft.

The Mémorial de la France combattante was built between 1958 and 1960, as a tribute to the 1,000 members of the French Resistance who were executed. It was built under the direction of Inspector General Félix Bruneau. A different artist sculpted each of the high allegorical reliefs; for example, it depicts the French expeditionary corps in Narvick (Norway), deportation, and the Liberation of Paris. A crypt houses the remains of 17 soldiers and resistance fighters. For Philippe Castagnetti, it's a “paradoxical resacralization of Mont-Valérien” around the memory and martyrdom of the Second World War, mirroring the mountain's thousand-year-old religious and penitential history. A "memory trail" around the execution sites of resistance fighters was subsequently set up, and a museum space opened in 2010.

=== Liberation ===
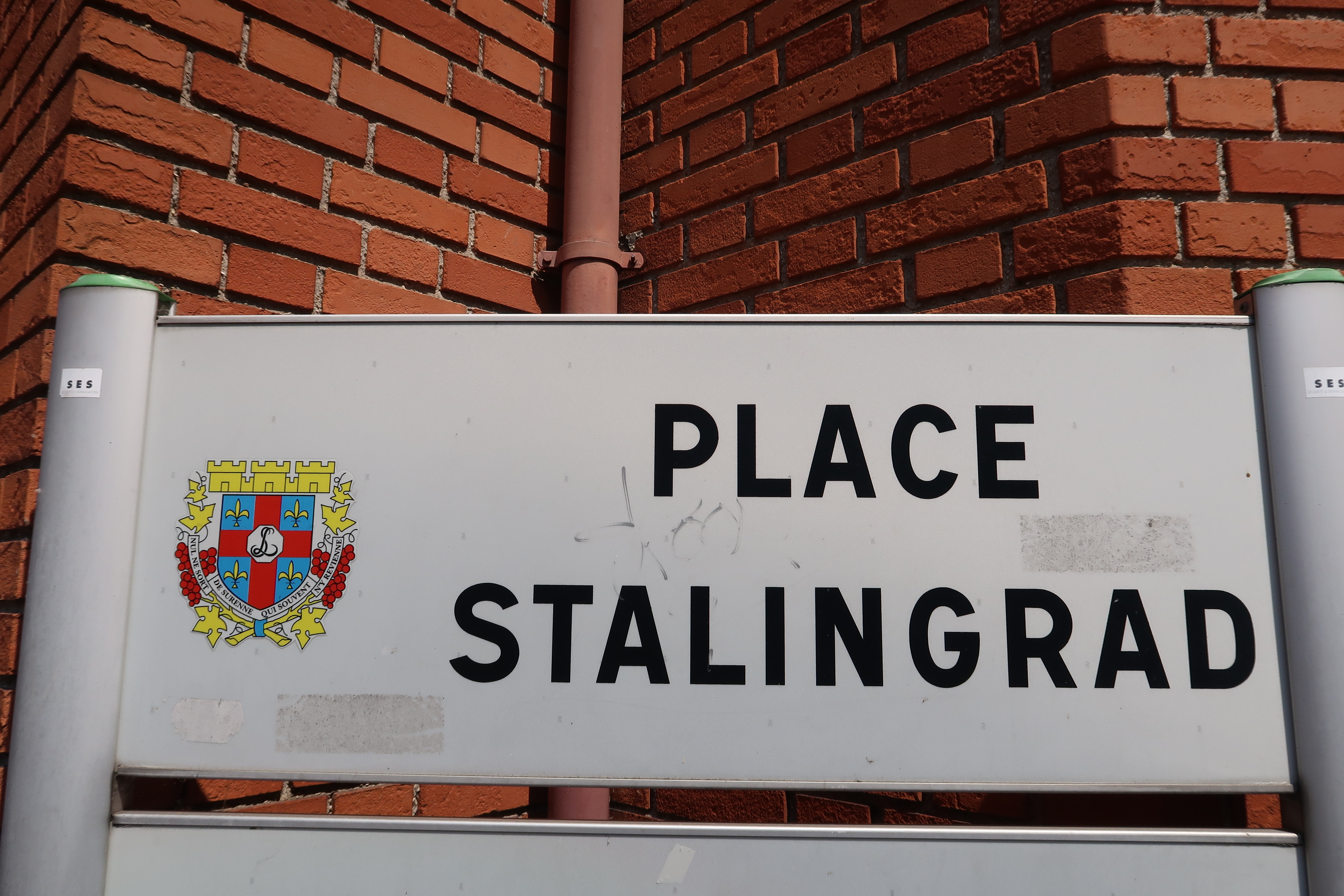
In the garden city, the Place de la Société-des-Nations was renamed Place Stalingrad after the Liberation.

June 1944 saw the arrival of the Allied landings, the prelude to the Liberation of France, and more friction with the Nazis. On July 19, a German soldier was killed in Rue du Pont, in front of the Hewittic factory, but no one was identified as being responsible. On August 4, the Nazis executed two random hostages at the same location: Raymon Jozin, a 21-year-old worker at a boiler factory in Puteaux who was not carrying his work card, and Georges Schepp, aged 23, whose motive for arrest is unknown. A plaque, which has now disappeared, like Rue du Pont, pays tribute to them.

On August 20, during the fighting for the Liberation of Paris, the Germans stationed in Suresnes, originally from Wrocław, took refuge in the fort. Over the next few days, the people of Suresnes expected French soldiers to arrive via the Quai or the Boulevard de Versailles, as a group of the 2nd AD led by Colonel Langlade was stationed in Sèvres. Residents took refuge in the town center. At the same time, German flak from Longchamp continued to fire. The confusion of information led to several events during the last night of the occupation, from August 24 to 25: barricades were erected, batteries were fired on Paris, Germans destroyed a barricade at the Suresnes bridge, and German convoys traveled up the Boulevard de Versailles with lights out. The next day, at 2:30 pm, French soldiers were seen in the Bois de Boulogne. The tank took a soldier from the Régiment blindé de fusiliers-marins to the Red Cross post, his head blown off at Porte de Madrid, and another, Michel Vassal, was shot dead at the same spot.

On the evening of August 25, soldiers from the 2nd Armored Division and Americans were stationed at the Longchamp racecourse, many of them strolling through Suresnes, where they distributed food and cigarettes to the inhabitants, arousing the population's enthusiasm. At 9 p.m., the bells of the Suresnes church rang out, as did those of the entire Paris diocese, saluting General Leclerc's arrival in Paris. Tricolored flags were flying.

Negotiations take place with the Germans and militiamen still hiding in the fort on Mont Valérien, as the people of Suresnes fear that they will blow up the military building before they leave. The former occupiers, however, were only willing to surrender to American troops. Talks were successful, however, and the surrender was handed over to the troops of the 2nd AD. On August 26 at 10.30 a.m., the French flag could once again be flown over the fort. The whistling and explosion of V2s could be heard, but they did not hit Suresnes.

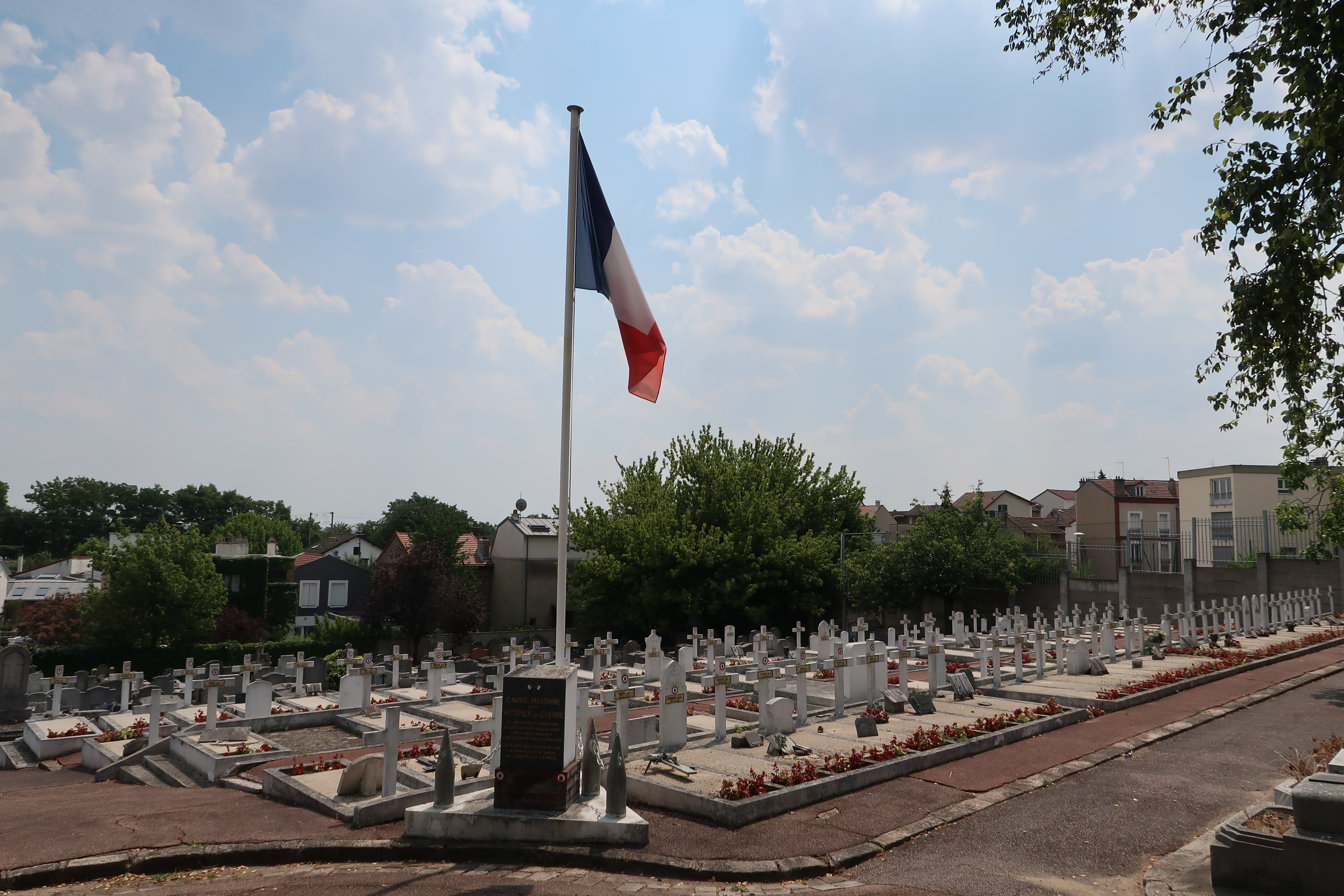
Military square of soldiers who died during the Second World War, in the Voltaire cemetery.

Jean Becker, president of the Société Historique de Suresnes and curator of the municipal museum, who completed René Sordes' book after his death, notes, however, that after the Liberation, “the days that followed, when everything that could divide the French should have been forgotten, were unfortunately marked by a veritable outburst of partisan passions, and it is not without sadness that we recall all those denunciations made under the guise of purge, which were often, in reality, nothing more than the satisfaction of personal grudges.” On August 26, several women and girls were publicly shorn for their relations with the occupying forces, taken on carts through the streets of Suresnes, and paraded.

The historian Henri Amouroux, in La vie française sous l'Occupation, noted that food shortages had adversely affected the health of the population, particularly young people. He notes: “In Suresnes, 35% of girls and 41% of boys attending school lost weight in six months.”

A marble plaque was installed on the main staircase of the town hall, engraved with the names of the victims of the conflict. There were 75 civilian victims, 8 shot, 23 political deportees, 30 killed in action (maquis and Liberation), 53 soldiers killed by the enemy, 25 deported for work, 21 prisoners of war, and 28 racial deportees.

== Fourth Republic ==
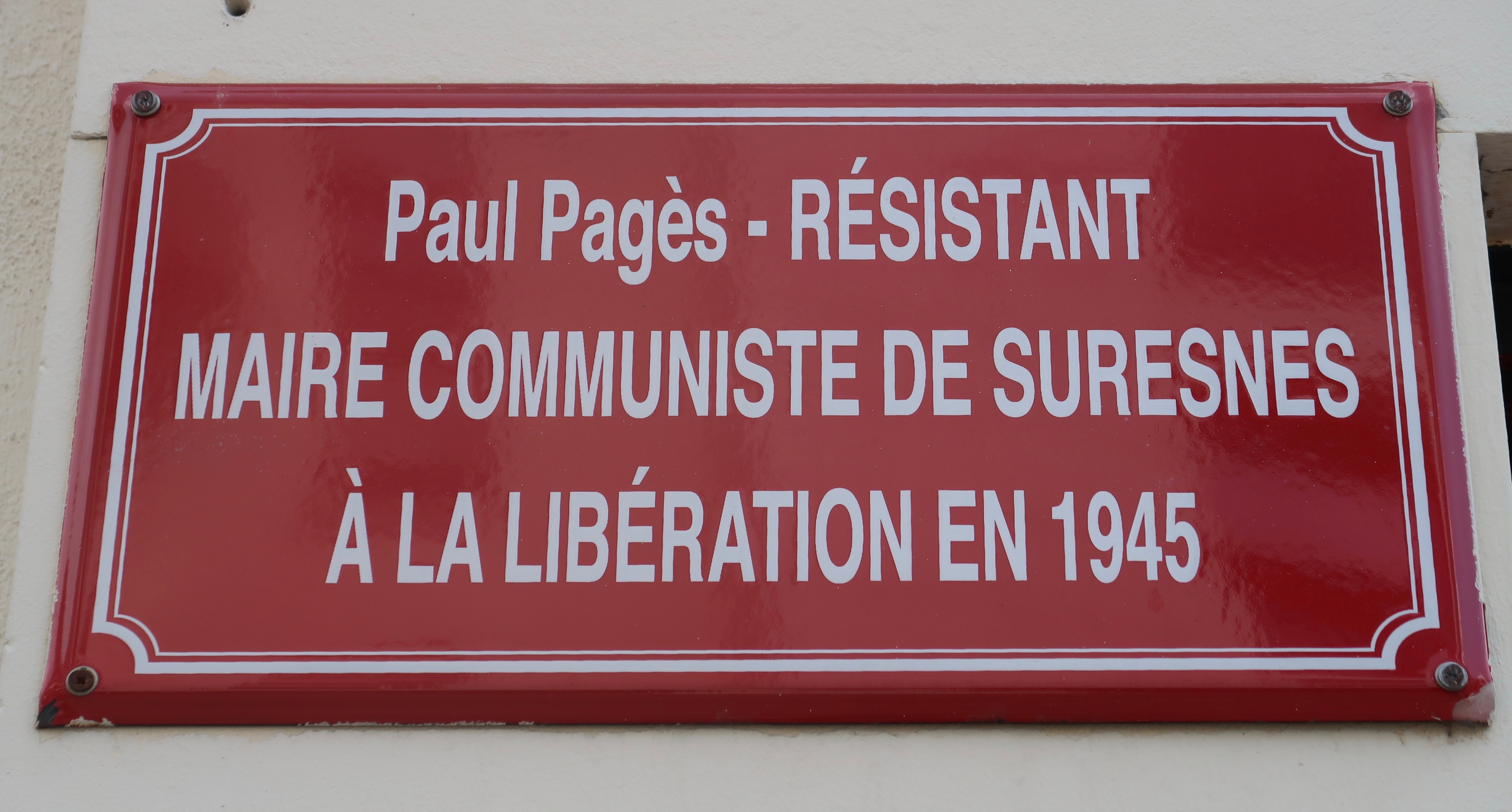
Plaque in homage to the communist mayor Paul Pagès, on the facade of the PCF premises in Suresnes.

Since 1941, the municipality has been run by a special delegation. It ceased to function at the time of liberation, and a man named Roussel, a town hall secretary, member of the PCF, and founder of the local Liberation committee, ran the municipality for a few days. He was then replaced by the committee's chairman, Jules Courtin, a former advisor to Henri Sellier and Compagnon de la Libération. The first municipal elections were held on April 29, 1945, for the first round, and on May 13 for the second round, in which the “anti-fascist” list came out on top. Communist Paul Pagès, a member of the local Liberation committee and former political prisoner, twice escaped and was sentenced in absentia, became mayor. On June 16, one of his first acts was to inaugurate a reception center for prisoners and deportees in the former Kommandatur on Rue Desbassayns-de-Richemont. The municipality also surveyed available housing, the extent of bomb damage, and the composition of the city's population, renovated the HLM de la Fouilleuse and rehoused Suresnois, whose homes were too dilapidated (particularly in the historic city center). On July 19, 1945, the Office National Météorologique was succeeded by the Météorologie Nationale, located in the fortress and under the authority of the Directorate General for Civil Aviation. A Communist town between 1945 and 1947, Suresnes was briefly part of the “red belt.” But in October 1947, the Socialist Louis Bert was elected mayor. In 1948, the market moved to the former Place Trarieux, recently renamed Place du Général-Leclerc. In 1951, the new Suresnes bridge was completed and the Société histoire de Suresnes resumed its activities, with René Sordes and Jean Becker. During this decade, the Vendanges Festival was revived, under the impetus of the Free Commune of Suresnes and the Suresnois Youth Union. Buildings damaged by the war or in a state of disrepair were rebuilt or renovated, as was the town hall, which also underwent major work in 1970 and again in 1992.

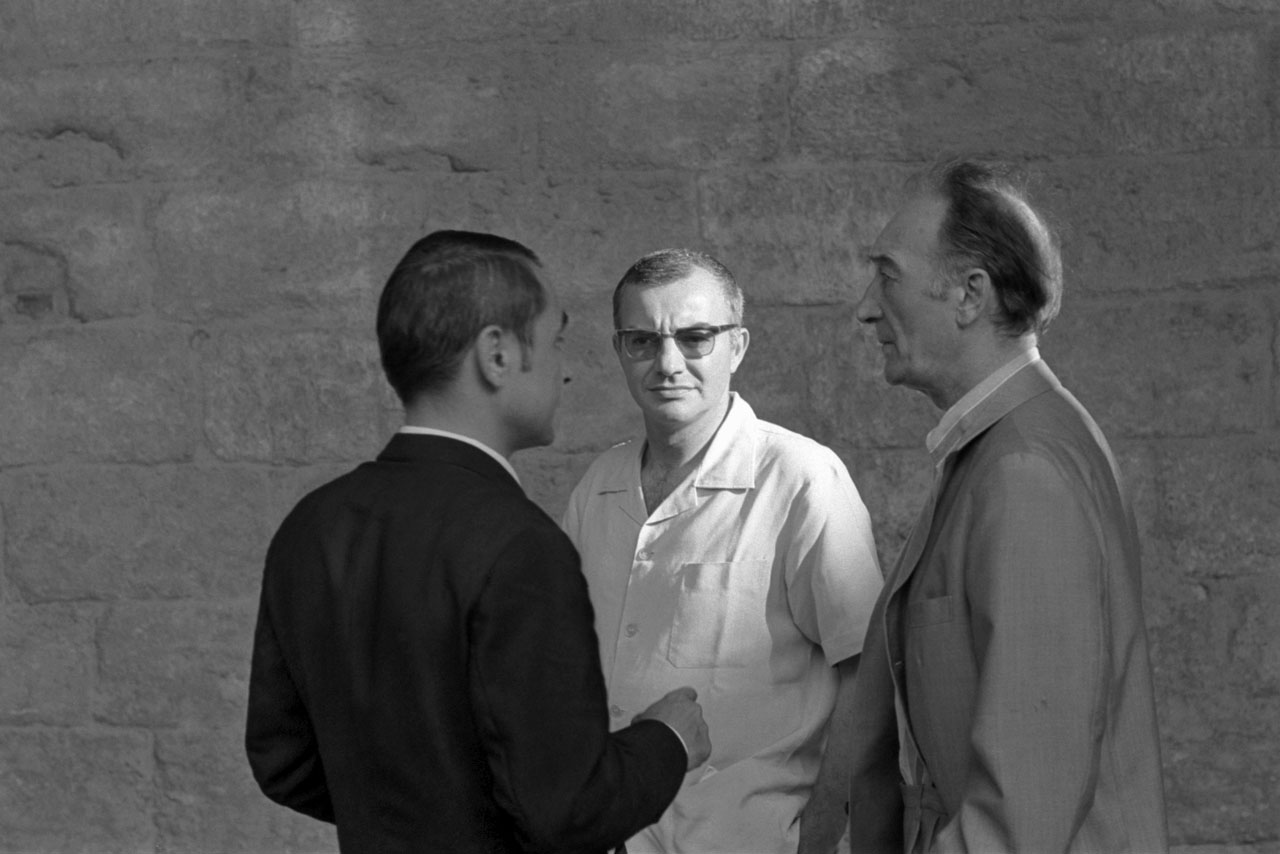
Jean Vilar (on the right in the photo, at the 1967 Avignon festival) worked in the 1950s in the Suresnes theatre, which now bears his name.

The Petit Festival de Suresnes was created in the early 1950s by Jean Vilar and his troupe. Jean Vilar had had to leave the Théâtre national de Chaillot in 1951. He decided to organize a major theatrical tour of the Paris suburbs to create “dramatic bastions” around the capital and stimulate cultural interaction. His starting point was Suresnes, in the 1,200-seat theater built in 1938 and little used since, but with plenty of free space, enabling him to stage performances on weekdays and weekends, with a particular emphasis on modernity. Between 1951 and 1954, and again between 1956 and 1957, Jean Vilar's troupe gave several performances (Corneille's Le Cid, Brecht's Mère Courage et ses enfants, Darius Milhaud's La création du monde, etc.) at the Albert-Thomas leisure center in the cité-jardin. However, the press reaction was lukewarm: in Le Monde of November 21, 1951, Robert Kemp wrote: “Really, I haven't felt such emotion for years [...]. Thierry Maulnier, to whom the mayor Raymond Cosson would later reply with virulence, criticized the town of Suresnes in Combat: “One of those garden cities that are neither cities nor gardens. A large, sad avenue, lined with trees that don't dare to grow; on either side, dull, dead housing barracks, their bricks already faded.” During the first weekend of performances, the audience was mainly Parisian. However, spectators from the suburbs (young people, shopkeepers, employees, and students) found the value-for-money proposition interesting. Jean Vilar returned to Chaillot in May 1952, and TNP performances in the suburbs ended at the end of the 1950s, leaving a legacy of cultural roots in several towns (Vincennes, Aubervilliers, Bobigny, etc.), with a heterogeneous audience. The Centre Albert-Thomas, now the Théâtre Jean-Vilar, underwent a major renovation in the late 1980s.

Having become a workers' garden, the former FCS soccer pitch was bought by Suresnes mayor Paul Pagès, who created the Maurice-Hubert stadium (a former JSS leader and member of the Resistance). Jeunesse Sportive de Suresnes played in the first division from 1945 to 1953, then in the promotion division. With the arrival of Antoine Jurilli, the club returned to the first division. The club also set up a soccer school, from which Robin Leclercq graduated. In 1965, the club moved up to the Division d'Honneur, where it remained until 1993, before spending two years in the Division d'Honneur Régionale. During this period, Jeunesse Sportive de Suresnes won two Hauts-de-Seine cups and took part in the final of the Coupe de Paris.

From 1947 to 1956, a community of Danish artists, including Robert Jacobsen and Richard Mortensen, moved into part of painter Louis-Olivier Chesnay's villa at 20 Rue de la Tuilerie. The site was later demolished to make way for low-cost housing. Pierre-Marie Deparis and Tristan Hédoux, teachers at Paul-Langevin High School, have written a book about this art-historical episode, La Maison des Artistes danois de Suresnes (2017).

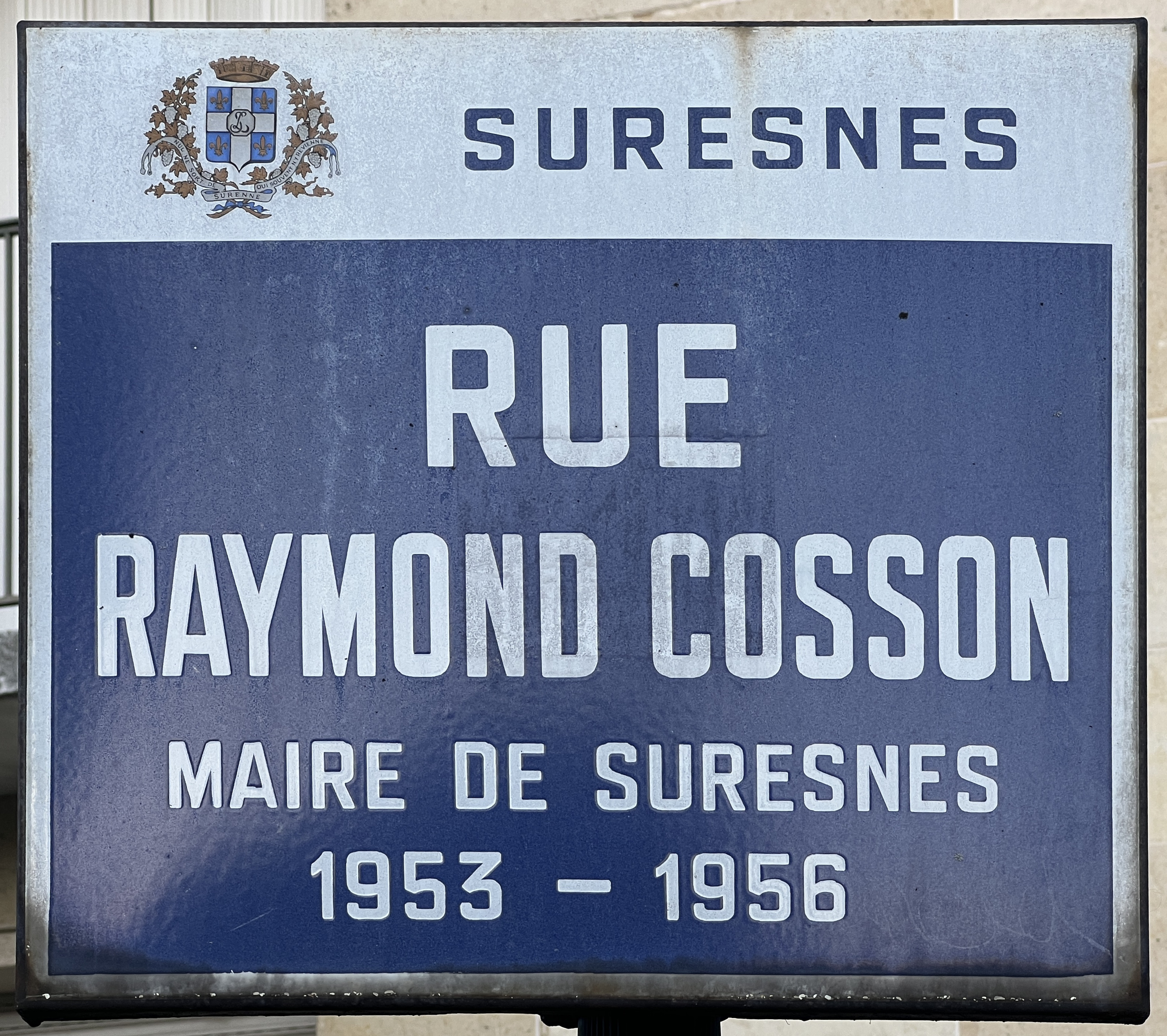
Plaque on Rue Raymond-Cosson, in tribute to the mayor in office from 1953 to 1956.

In June 1953, Raymond Cosson was elected mayor. He built the Jacques-Decour town for older people, with a home and restaurant. He also reaffirmed his support for Jean Vilar's theatrical venture. Raymond Cosson also developed the Wilson kindergarten and took part in the reconstruction of the Fouilleuse district, against a backdrop of demographic growth, where he felt that each of the commune's major districts (cité-Jardin, Plateau Nord, Verdun, République) should now include social facilities (notably schools) and places of worship. On June 20, 1954, the municipal museum reopened. In 1955, young people from Suresnes were sent to a vacation camp in Évian-les-Bains, continuing the tradition of municipal camps in Le Grand-Bornand (where Suresnes owns a chalet), Ile d'Oléron, Carnac, and Lamoura. Raymond Cosson died in office and was succeeded by Marcel Legras in December 1956. A schoolteacher, then an accountant, and a former adviser to Henri Sellier, he had helped to set up the first social security funds and had joined the Resistance. Over a decade, 1,028 housing units were built in the Carnot-Gambetta, Cité-Jardin, and Plateau-Nord districts, schools were enlarged, and plans were launched to build the Raguidelles and Cottages school complexes. In 1957, a new post office was inaugurated on the corner of Rue Gabriel-Péri and Rue Fizeau, with the former premises on Rue Carnot becoming a Social Security annex.

== Fifth Republic ==
From 1958 onwards, Suresnes began twinning with several foreign towns: (Note: Initiated in 1905, the twinning with Keighley ended with the First World War. Furthermore, Rue Keighley has since been renamed Avenue Georges-Pompidou.) Hann. Münden (Germany) in 1960, Holon (Israel, where there is a “Suresnes Square”) in 1961, Hackney (United Kingdom) in 1962, Kragujevac (Yugoslavia) in 1967, and Villach (Austria) in 1992. On December 1, 1962, a monument to Henri Sellier was inaugurated in the town hall park. The Cité de l'Europe, a vast circular block of flats, is built in the town center, replacing a 17th-century mansion. At the corner of Boulevard Washington and Avenue Franklin-Roosevelt, an orientation table with a view of the capital is erected. At 70 Avenue Franklin-Roosevelt, the last farm in Suresnes disappeared in 1964, making way for a restaurant. René Sordes, author of a municipal history of Suresnes, died in 1965, and the pediment of the municipal museum pays tribute to him. That same year, Robert Pontillon (SFIO) was elected mayor. He inaugurated the Cottages school. In 1966, the Albert-Caron residence was created, adding to the existing maisons de quartiers (Gardenat, Couvaloux) and meeting places (Payret-Dortail, Merlin-de-Thionville) for older people. In the cité-jardin, the Caron covered market was inaugurated the same year, between Rue Caron and Avenue Jean-Jaurès, replacing the former market on Avenue Édouard-Vaillant. On March 4, 1968, the Société d'économie mixte pour la rénovation de Suresnes (Mixed economy company for the renovation of Suresnes), abbreviated as SEMERSu, was created, recognized as a public utility in 1971, and granted a ZAC decree in 1972 to plan the reconfiguration of the town center. In 1968, the municipality celebrated the 1050th anniversary of the town's “birth”. (Note: If we consider the charter of Charles the Simple of 918 as the founding act of Suresnes, as was long believed, while it took up the terms of the donation of Carloman of 884.)

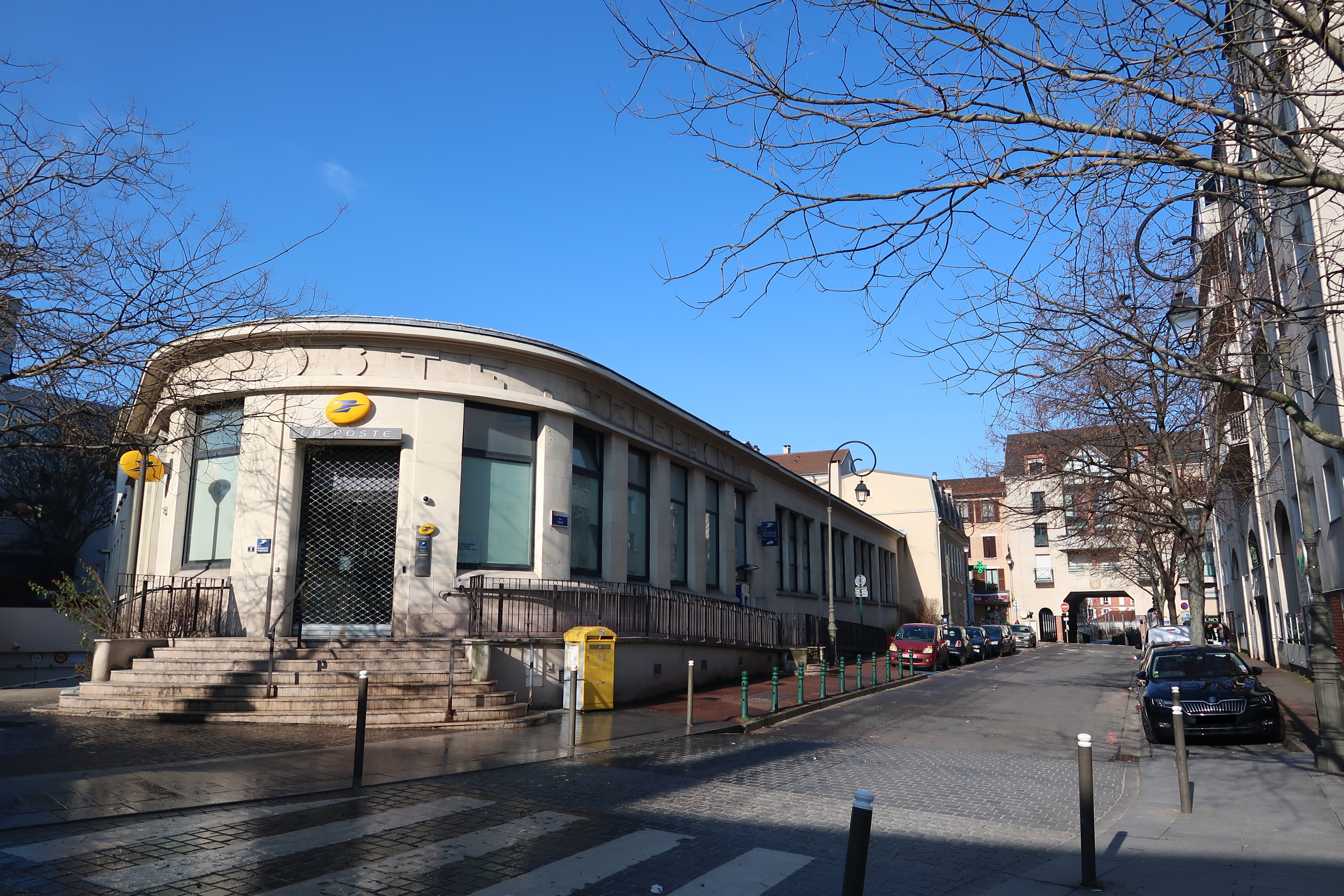
The downtown post office, built in 1957.

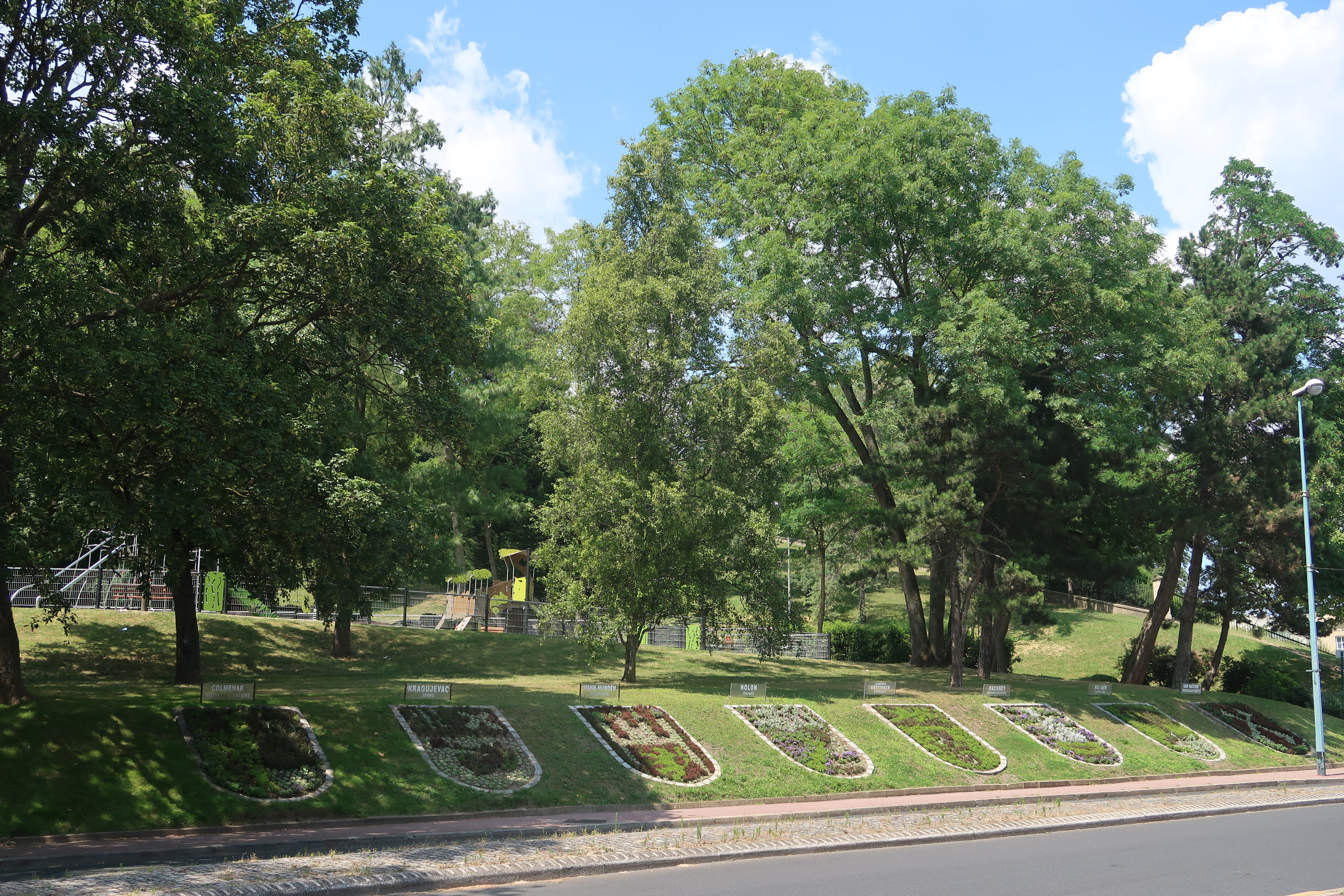
Flower beds in the Landes park, in homage to the towns with which Suresnes is twinned.

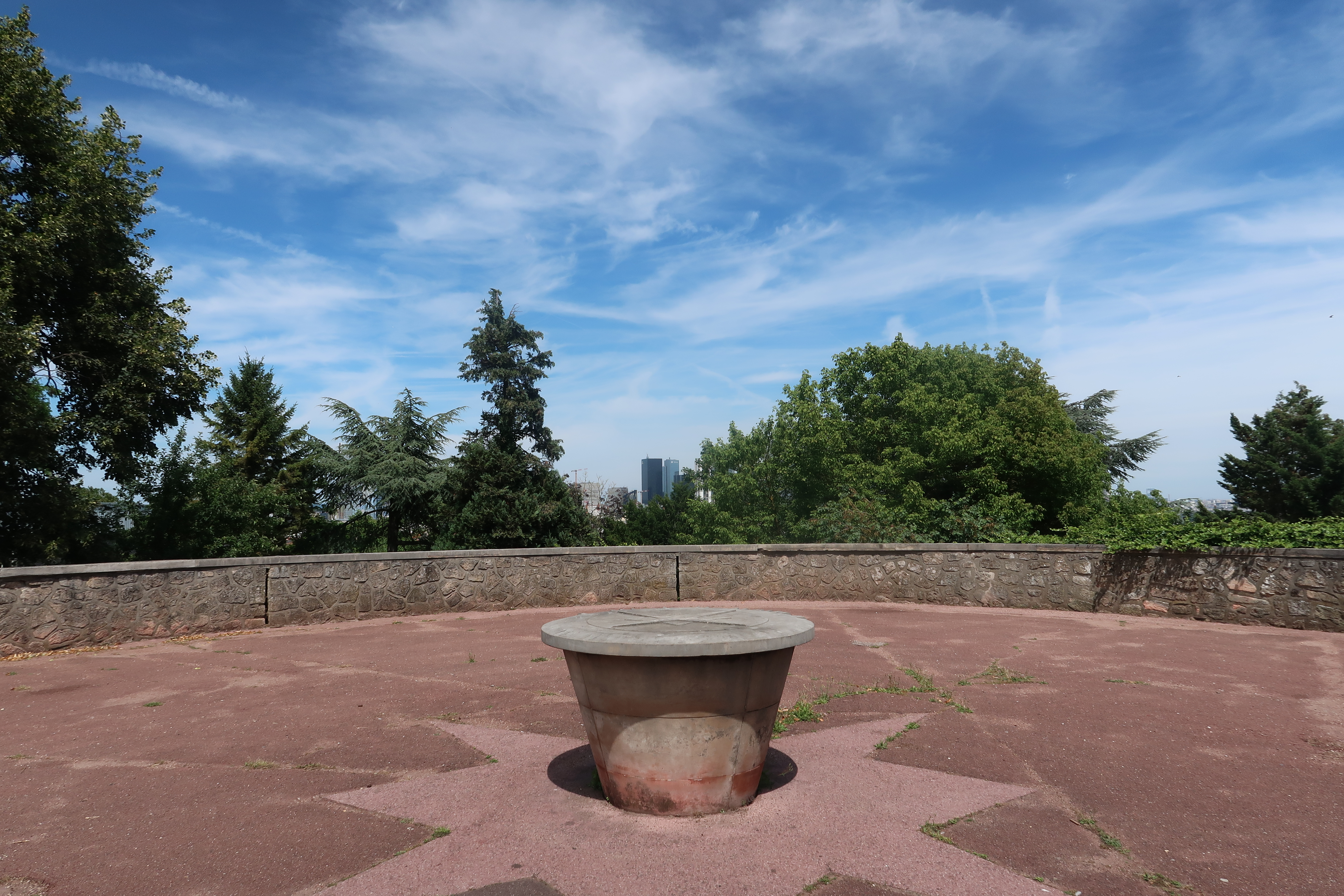
The orientation table, which offers a view of La Défense.

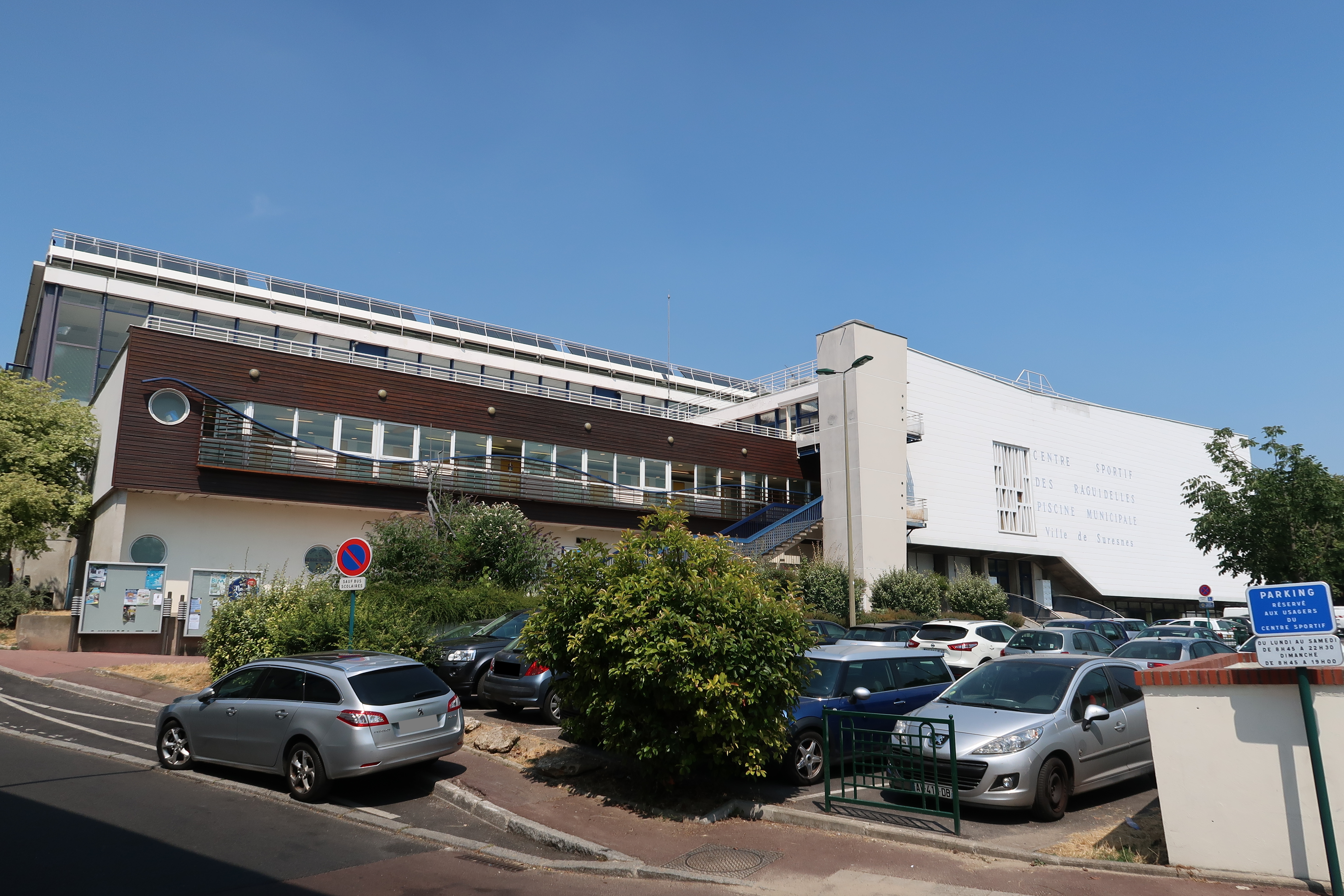
The Raguidelles swimming pool.

Actor Jean-Pierre Aumont rented the main part of the property known as Les Copeaux, on Rue des Raguidelles. He left the town in 1951 after the death of his wife, actress María Montez. The three-hectare site was acquired by the municipality, which built a school, gymnasium, and swimming pool over the following decade. The latter was inaugurated in 1968, becoming Suresnes' first public swimming pool.

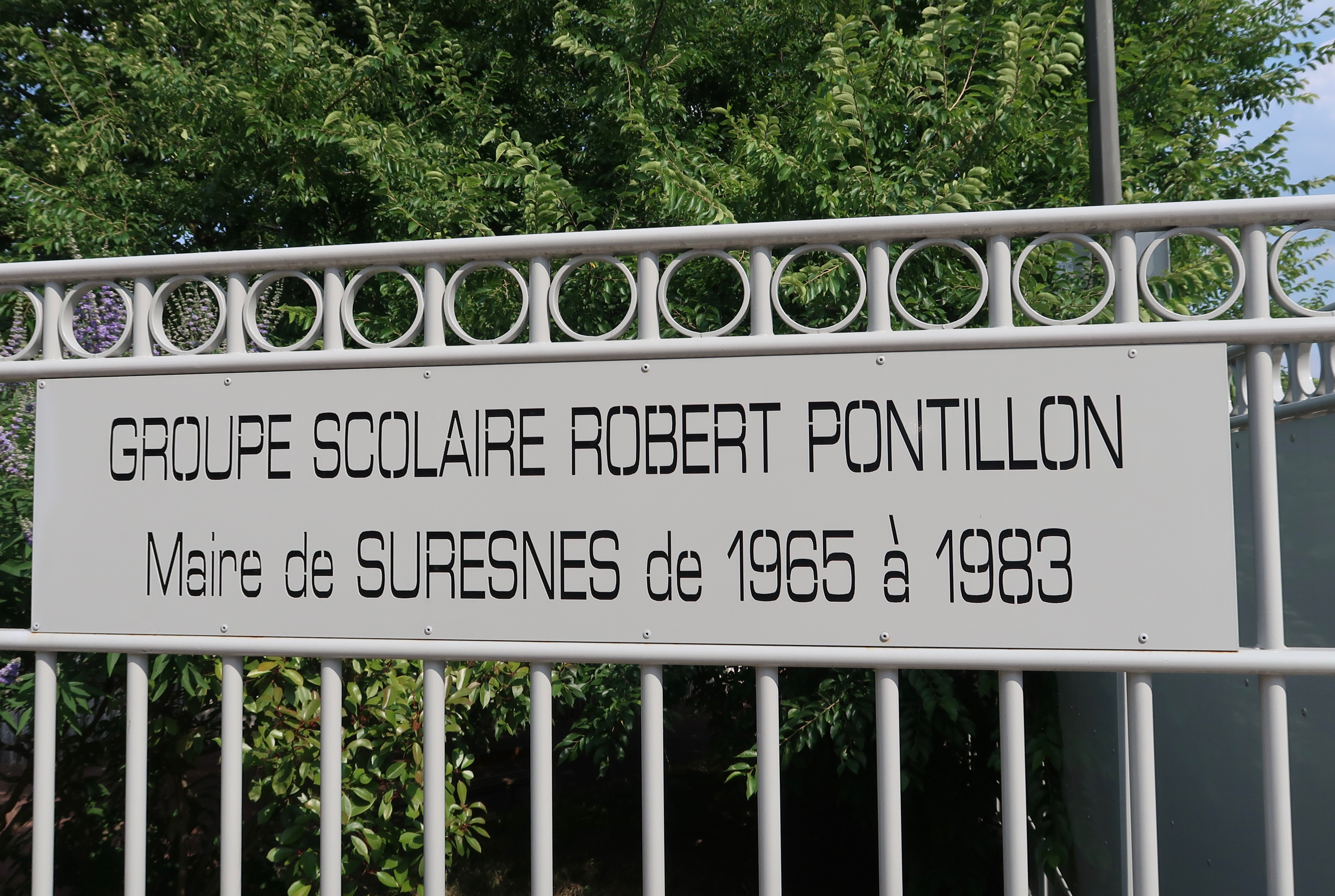
Plaque of the Robert-Pontillon school group, in tribute to the mayor in office from 1965 to 1983.

The Foyer des Jeunes Travailleurs (Rue des Carrières) and the Foyer des Jeunes Travailleuses (Avenue du Président-Wilson) were founded to accommodate young people who had come to work in Suresnes. Robert Pontillon was re-elected in 1971 and worked on the redevelopment of Bas-Suresnes, where towers began replacing old houses. In 1974, the remains of the maison seigneuriale - the former printing works where Jean Jaurès and Charles Péguy corrected the proofs of their manuscripts — and the guinguette La Belle-Gabrielle, were demolished. The historic site of the Fontaine du Tertre, which once housed a farm and orchard, was replaced by the buildings of the Foch hospital. In 1975, the Voltaire school (later named Robert Pontillon) was built, and in 1982, the Cité de l'Enfance. Inaugurated in 1973, the Salvador Allende stadium was the mayor's way of paying tribute to his Chilean friend, the victim of a coup d'état that same year; in 1983, to commemorate the 40th anniversary of Jean Moulin's death, the sports facility was renamed after the resistance fighter. Since 1975, it has been home to the Rugby Club Suresnes Hauts-de-Seine. In 1974, the Spanish Socialist Workers' Party — then illegal under Franco's regime — held its 26th congress in Suresnes. 1979 saw the inauguration of the Parc Départemental du Mont-Valérien, which runs around the fortress.

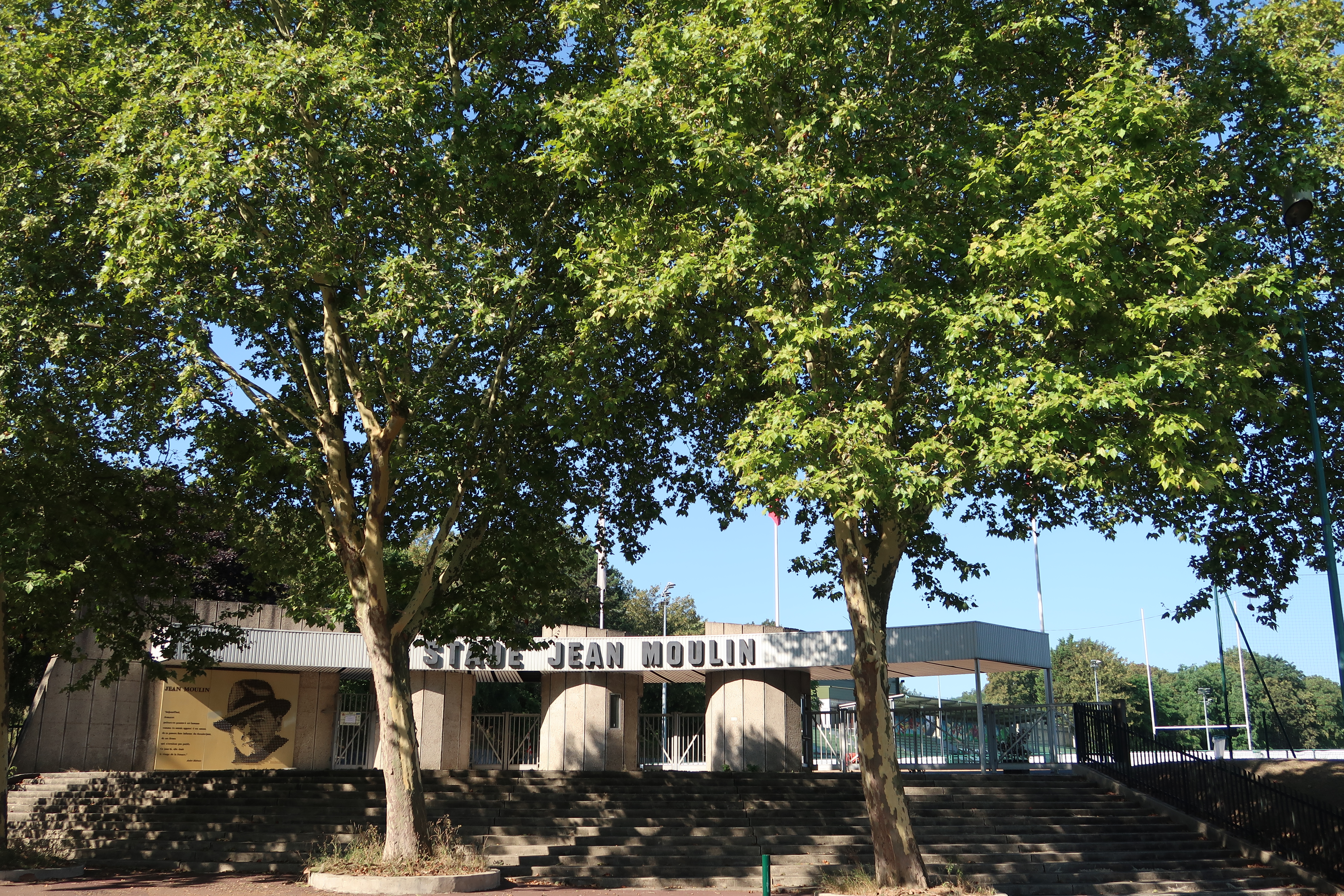
The Jean-Moulin stadium.

A left-wing municipality since 1919 — apart from the Second World War — Suresnes switched to the right in 1983 when Christian Dupuy (RPR) was elected mayor. In 2004, he declared a posteriori: “I still remember when I discovered Suresnes nearly thirty years ago. The town seemed abandoned. Down below, as you walked along the Seine, you could see the remnants of a glorious industrial past well and truly over. The city, littered with industrial wastelands, was dying. On the higher ground, I discovered what had certainly been the most successful model of the garden-city concept, but what a state it was in!" The mayor deplored the fact that his predecessors had seen fit to solve certain problems by destroying part of the historic city center and then rebuilding it almost entirely, in a pattern he called “dramatic” (the first demolition work took place on Place Henri-IV in 1970). The heart of Suresnes was thus covered with a shopping mall (Suresnes 2) and, in a more scattered fashion, tall buildings, and low-income housing blocks, “which changed the face of Suresnes, giving it that concrete look. [...] These urban developments exacerbated the industrial, economic, and demographic decline of Suresnes.” The mayor noted the successive departure of industrial and commercial activities from the town, even though Suresnes enjoyed what he considered an exceptional location, on the hillside of Mont Valérien, giving it “a view of the Bois de Boulogne and Paris that is unrivaled in the region.”

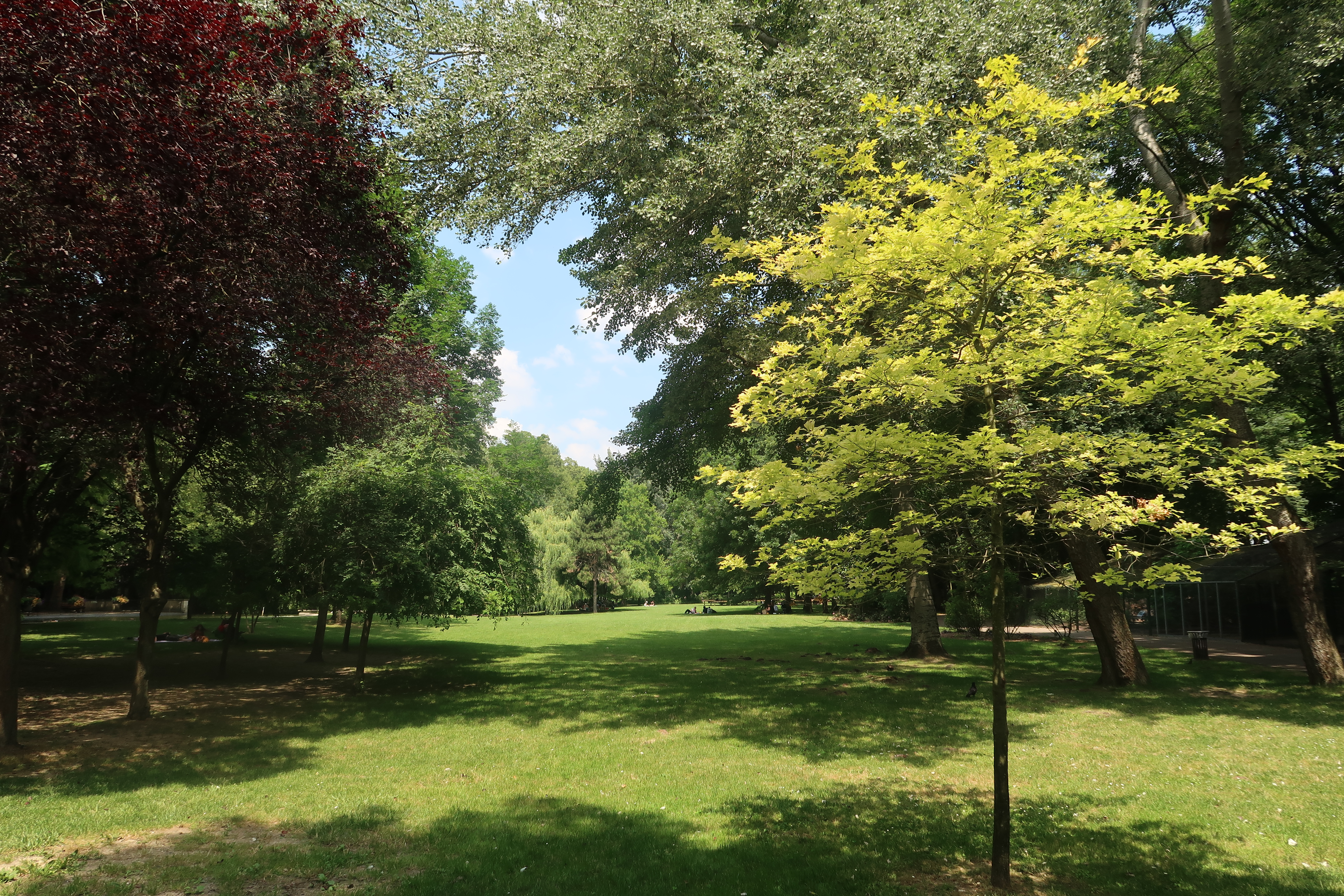
The park of the Château, which was that of the Château de Suresnes, a building since destroyed.

Christian Dupuy, therefore, embarked on a broad policy of revitalization and rehabilitation. In his mind, the aim was “to breathe new life into Suresnes, to maintain and reinforce its modern, urban, Parisian, village and provincial character.” To this end, an action plan has been launched to attract new businesses and encourage the creation of small and medium-sized craft industries. To prevent further urban destruction, as in the previous decade, the city was given an architectural and urban heritage protection zone, covering two-thirds of its surface area. Transformed into an Aire de mise en valeur de l'architecture et du paysage (architectural and heritage enhancement area) by city council deliberation on February 12, 2014, this public utility easement automatically became a site patrimonial remarquable (outstanding heritage site) on the date of promulgation of the law on the freedom of creation, architecture, and heritage (2016). The mayor increased the number of schools, stadiums, gymnasiums, retirement homes, and medical centers and initiated the creation of a new media library in the early 2000s. Whereas in 1983, the city had just one crèche for every 35,000 inhabitants, by 2004 it had eleven for every 40,000. The cité-jardin was listed as a historic site and rehabilitated between 1985 and 1996. The République district was rebuilt around the former Château de Suresnes, or Château de Bel-Air, and the industrial wastelands of lower Suresnes were reconverted. In the early 2000s, new projects were launched, such as the reconstruction of the Caron-Jaurès market in the cité-jardin. The number of businesses increased, contributing half of the town's tax revenues. Finally, between 1983 and 1993, the surface area of public green spaces doubled. Under his first term of office, the renovation of the town center was completed (with the Esplanade des Courtieux), environmental management was taken into consideration, obsolete equipment was replaced and low-income housing estates were rehabilitated. The oldest school in Suresnes, École Jules-Ferry, was completely renovated in 1986. In September 1987, the Henri-Dunant children's village was created, and in February 1988, the République Nursery School was established. In June 1988, the Parc du Château, heir to the garden of the former Château de Suresnes, which had been demolished shortly before to make way for a housing development, was inaugurated.

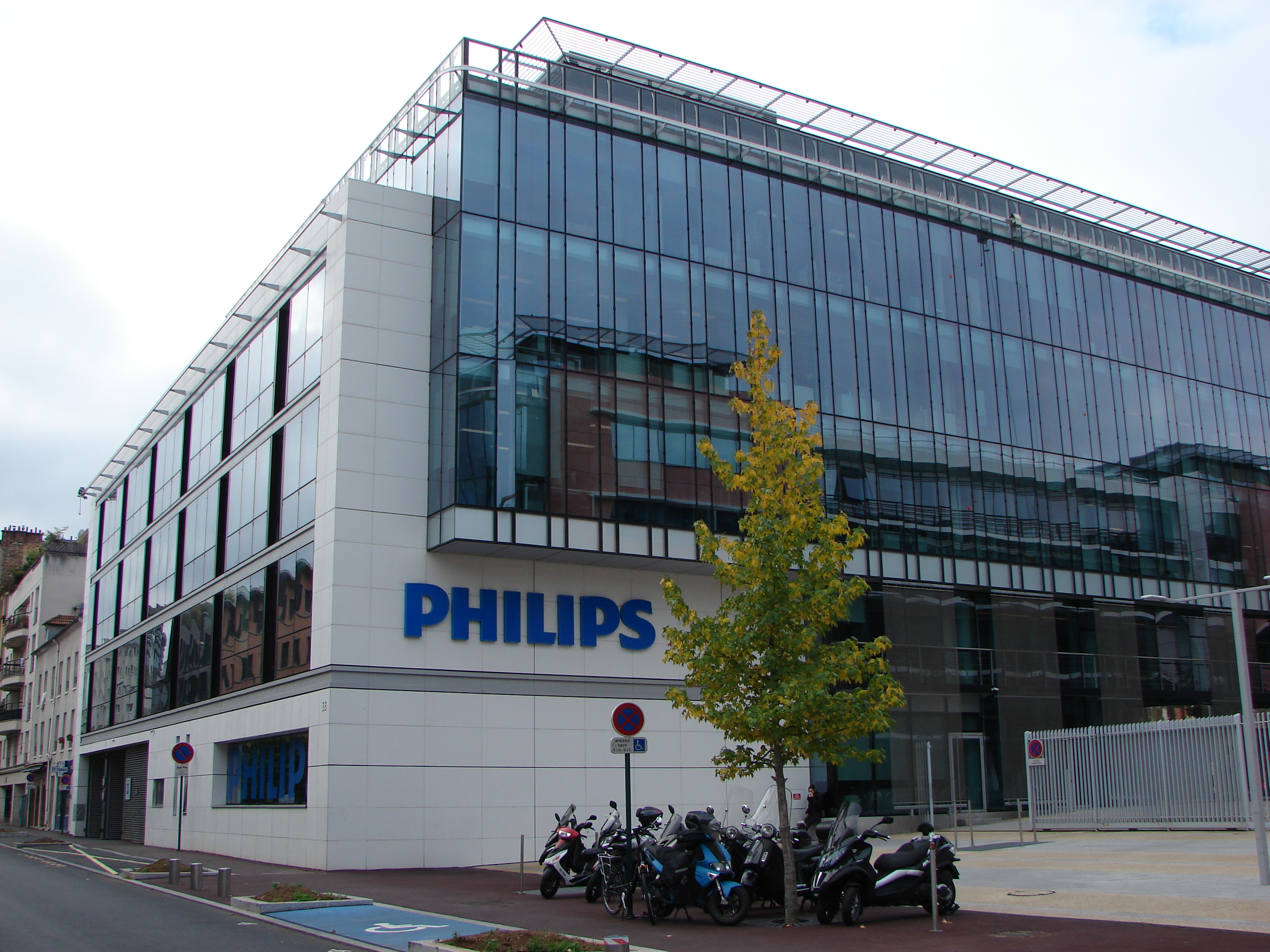
Philips Company, 33 Rue de Verdun, one of the many companies headquartered in Suresnes.

In 1989, Suresnes had 3,500 sports enthusiasts in 46 associations, covering 29 disciplines (basketball, boules, horse riding, soccer, karate, gymnastics, etc.). Many sportsmen and women hail from the town, including Philippe Legrand, three-time French 10,000-meter champion, and Gérard Brunel, French 400-meter hurdles champion. The town also boasts a municipal music, dance, and drama conservatory, which in 1989 welcomed over 1,000 students in 24 disciplines.

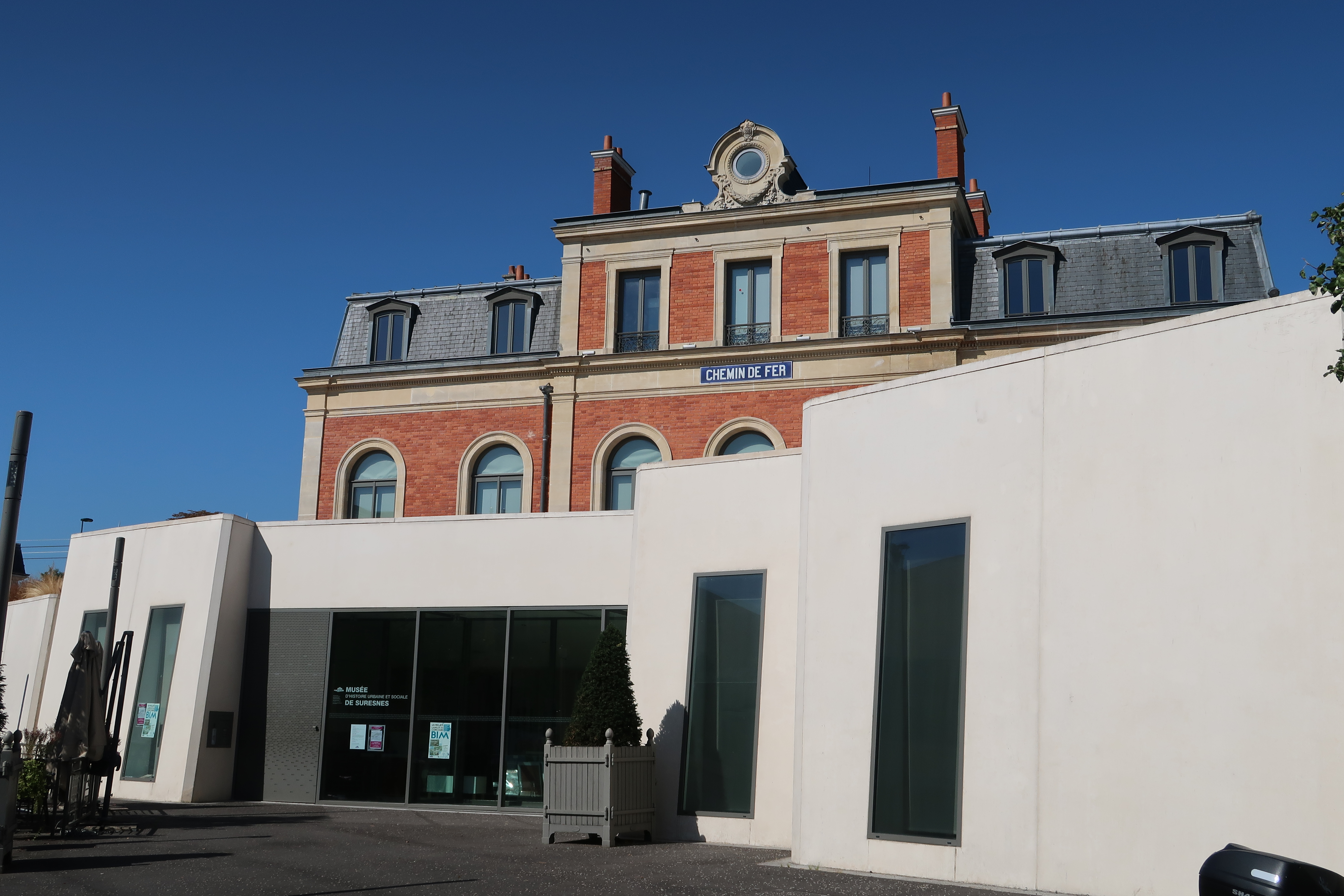
Suresnes-Longchamp station and the museum, inaugurated in 2013.

In the second half of the century, as the suburbs developed and the automobile became more widely available, Suresnes became a daily stopover for many residents of western Paris, on their way to work in the capital. The closure of factories in the post-war period was soon accompanied by their replacement by residential estates and the headquarters of major companies. By 1989, these included the FCA advertising design company, two subsidiaries of Compagnie Générale des Eaux (Cable TV Teleservice) on Rue Diderot, the Cegetex alarm and remote surveillance company (on the same street), the PMU computer center, Philips, Schneider, Laden, Radiola and Ignis in the Tour Gallieni, the Adélie communications and advertising agency and the Servier laboratory (250 researchers), L'Aérospatiale (aeronautical research, 300-strong R&D center), the Société Européenne de Propulsion (SEP, which took part in the Ariane program) and Dassault Systèmes. On the corner of Rue Diderot stands the Guillaume Tell studio, in place of the former Le Capitole cinema, where Michel Sardou, Sylvie Vartan, the Rolling Stones, Iron Maiden, and Elton John recorded. A rare vestige of Suresnes' industrial past, Radiotechnique and CFEM, which helped build the Eiffel Tower, are still in existence. In October 1988, Suresnes was awarded the Marianne d'Or for economic growth.' In 2005, Talend, a software company specializing in data integration, was founded in Suresnes.

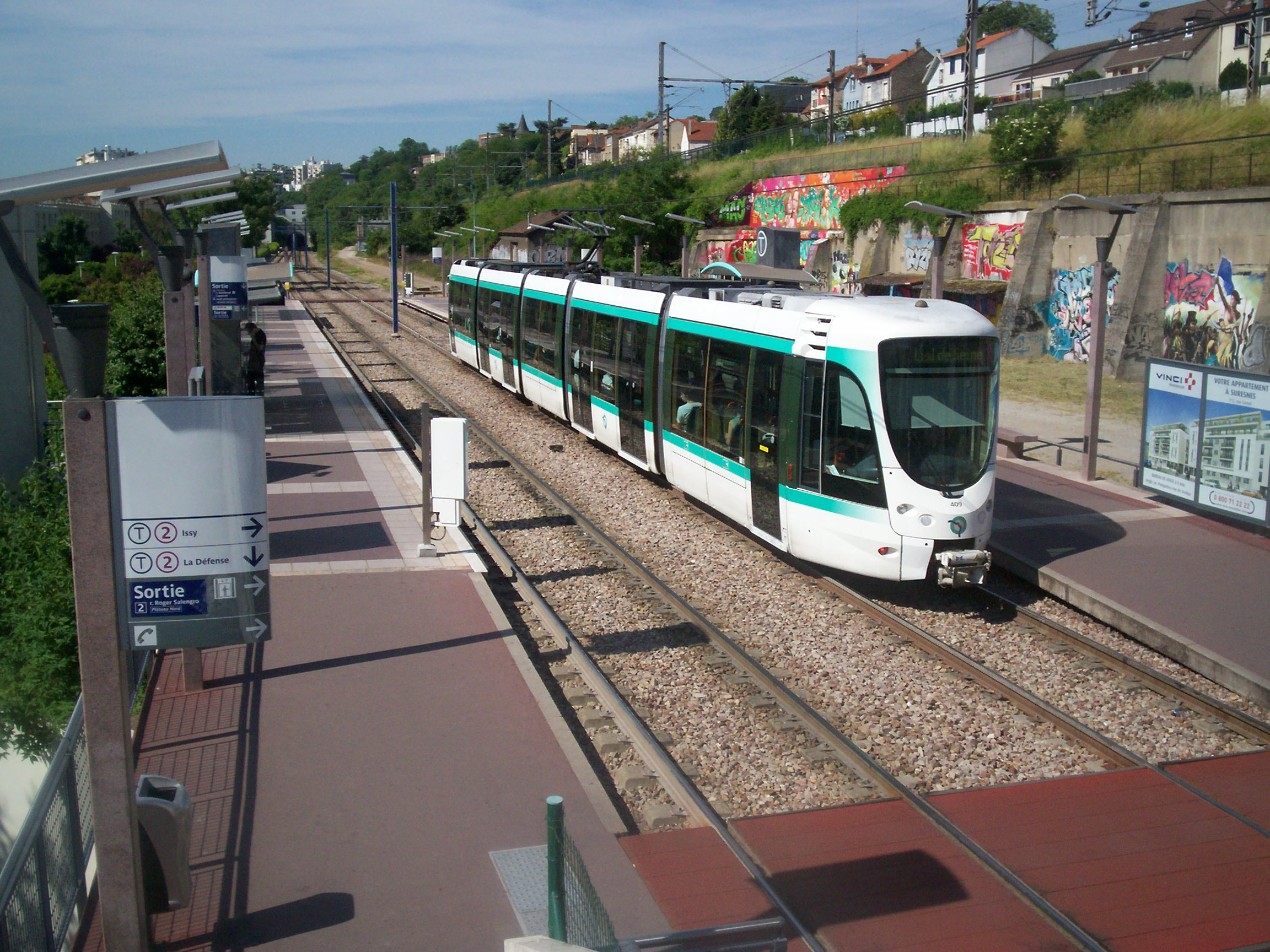
The tramway at the Suresnes-Belvédère line 2 station has replaced the Moulineaux line since 1997.

Many festivals continue to punctuate life in Suresnes. The town follows those organized at the national level, such as the Fête de la Musique and the Quatorze Juillet, for example, in the fort's moat. There are also more local events, such as the Fête des Vendanges, the Fêtes de la Seine (with a marine ball and a guinguette spirit), the Fête des Rosières, the "Mer à Suresnes" for children who can't go on vacation during the summer and who are invited to take up rowing, Ciné Expo Suresnes, the Nuit d'automne ball for needy elders, or the Fête de l'enfance at the end of the school year (hosted by Annie Fratellini, for example), a Concours d'élégance automobile ("Suresnes Auto Rétro") and the Foulée suresnoise, a race that attracts hundreds of participants from several European countries every year.

Although the number of vines has dwindled, their memory lives on, thanks to the efforts of the town council. In 1965, at a time when wine production had almost disappeared, (Note: In the 1970s, a private individual named Joyeux living on Rue de la Huchette was presented as the last winemaker in Suresnes.) the town council planted white grape varieties on 70 acres of land at Pas Saint-Maurice, along the Boulevard du Maréchal-de-Lattre-de-Tassigny. This clay-limestone plot had been purchased in 1926 by Henri Sellier, who had noticed the consequences of galloping urbanization and had already had a few vines planted. From 1983 onwards, planting and vinification were professionalized, and the estate grew to 1 hectare, “a sign of our commitment to preserving tradition,” says the mayor. As a result, Suresnes is one of the few towns in the Île-de-France region to still own a vineyard and produce wine (5,000 vines, or 4,000-5,000 bottles a year). Today, it's the only wine sold in the region. In 1984, the Confrérie du Taste-Vin de Suresnes was created by the Clos du Pas Saint-Maurice association to maintain and safeguard this heritage. Twice a year, on Saint-Vincent's Day and during the Fête des Vendanges in early October, ceremonies are held to induct new members, among whom we have counted many celebrities over the years.

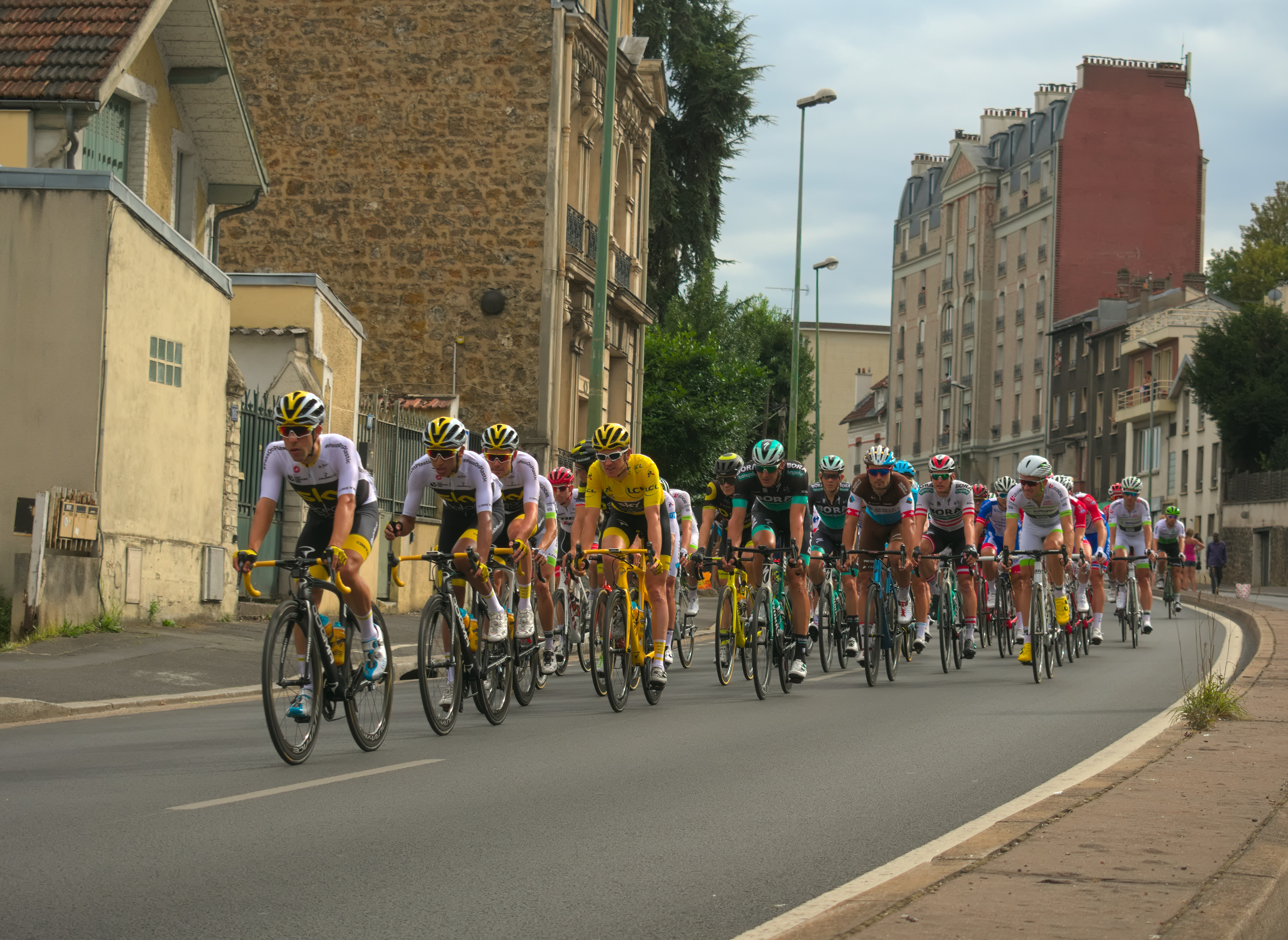
21st stage of the 2018 Tour de France, in Suresnes.

In 1990, Suresnes had a population of around 37,000. Former Iranian Prime Minister Shapour Bakhtiar, a resident of the town, was assassinated the following year. In 1993, the annual Suresnes Cités Danse contemporary dance festival was held at the Théâtre Jean-Vilar. The Suresnes-Longchamp railway station closed in 1993, at the same time as the line from Puteaux to Issy-Plaine (known as the Moulineaux line). It was reborn in 1997, when line 2 of the Île-de-France tramway was inaugurated, with two stops in the commune: Suresnes-Belvédère and Suresnes-Longchamp. Since 2013, the former station building has housed the Musée d'Histoire Urbaine et Sociale de Suresnes (Suresnes Museum of Urban and Social History), which preserves numerous objects and testimonials to the commune's past. In 2000, the former Le Capitole cinema (4 screens) reopened in a new building at 3 Rue Ledru-Rollin, right next to the new Médiathèque de Suresnes, the city's main library, which holds 130,000 documents. Another library is located in the Cité-Jardin, the Bibliothèque des Sorbiers, which closes in 2019 and is being replaced by the Médiathèque de la Poterie, which opens at the end of January 2020. In 2007, a music conservatory was inaugurated on Place du Puits-d'Amour, and in 2014, the Bagatelle shopping mall opened in the town center, featuring a dozen or so retailers. The following year, the city council voted to install a mosque at 5 Rue des Velettes. After joining the Mont-Valérien agglomeration community in 2009, Suresnes joined the Paris Ouest La Défense territorial public establishment in 2016, as part of the Greater Paris metropolis. In 2019, Suresnes will have a population of 48,620.

== See also ==
- Suresnes
- Puteaux
- Hauts-de-Seine
- Communes of the Hauts-de-Seine department
- Fort Mont-Valérien
- Garden City of Suresnes
- Suresnes American Cemetery and Memorial

== Bibliography ==
=== History of Suresnes ===
- Seron, Octave (1926). Suresnes d'autrefois et d'aujourd'hui [Suresnes of yesteryear and today] (in French). Le Livre d'histoire.
- Kuntz, François (1938). "Suresnes au Moyen-Âge: Évolution urbaine" [Suresnes in the Middle Ages: Urban Evolution]. L'Information Géographique (in French). La Chapelle Montligeon: Imprimerie de Montligeon.
- Sordes, René (1965). Histoire de Suresnes : Des origines à 1945 [History of Suresnes: From the origins to 1945] (in French). Société historique de Suresnes.
- Société Historique de Suresnes (1968). Suresnes, ses lieux dits et ses rues vous parlent [Suresnes, its places and its streets speak to you] (in French). Société historique de Suresnes. p. 64.
- Prévost, Francis (1989). Histoires de Suresnes [Stories of Suresnes] (in French). Suresnes Information. ISBN 2-9503475-0-9.
- Société Historique de Suresnes (1995). Le domaine des Hocquettes à Suresnes [The Hocquettes estate in Suresnes] (PDF) (in French). Altitude 85. p. 64.
- Hebert, Michel; Noël, Guy (1995). Suresnes, t. 1 (in French). Éditions Alan Sutton. ISBN 978-2-910444-24-2.
- Hebert, Michel; Noël, Guy (1996). Suresnes, t. 2 (in French). Éditions Alan Sutton. ISBN 978-2-910444-66-2.
- Société historique de Suresnes (2013). La belle histoire des rues de Suresnes [The beautiful story of the streets of Suresnes] (in French). Société historique de Suresnes.
- Bulletins de la Société historique de Suresnes [Bulletins of the Historical Society of Suresnes] (in French). Suresnes: Siege Social. 1955.

=== History of Mount Valérien ===
- Combe, Édouard de la (2011) [1835]. Histoire du Mont-Valérien [History of Mont-Valérien] (in French). Nabu Press. p. 178. ISBN 978-1271589951.
- Dulaure, J.-A.; Joanne, A.; de Labedollière, E. (1838). Suresnes et le mont Valérien [Suresnes and Mont Valérien] (in French). Les éditions du Bastion.
- Fillol, Jean Théoxène Roque de (2018) [1889]. Histoire de la presqu'île de Gennevilliers et du Mont-Valérien [History of the Gennevilliers peninsula and Mont-Valérien] (in French). Creative Media Partners. ISBN 9780270661682.
- Hénard, Robert (1904). Le mont Valérien, l'ermitage, le calvaire, la forteresse [Mount Valerian, the hermitage, the Calvary, the fortress] (in French). Émile-Paul éditeur.
- Fulgrand, F. J. (1918). "Son histoire religieuse" [Its religious history] (PDF). Le mont Valérien : Son histoire religieuse, son histoire militaire, ses cimetières [Mont Valérien: Its religious history, its military history, its cemeteries] (in French). Imprimerie de Montligeon. pp. 1–49.
- Fulgrand, F. J. (1918). "Son histoire militaire" [Its military history] (PDF). Le mont Valérien : Son histoire religieuse, son histoire militaire, ses cimetières [Mont Valérien: Its religious history, its military history, its cemeteries] (in French). Imprimerie de Montligeon. pp. 50–115.
- Fulgrand, F. J. (1918). "Ses cimetières" [Its cemeteries] (PDF). Le mont Valérien : Son histoire religieuse, son histoire militaire, ses cimetières [Mont Valérien: Its religious history, its military history, its cemeteries] (in French). Imprimerie de Montligeon. pp. 116–133.
- Tesson, L. (1921). Le mont Valérien, histoire (1400-1845) [Mount Valérien, history (1400-1845)] (PDF) (in French). Ville de Paris.
- Hérissay, Jacques (1934). Le Mont-Valérien. Les pèlerinages du Paris révolutionnaire [Mont-Valérien. The pilgrimages of revolutionary Paris] (in French). Perrin. p. 270.
- Poisson, Georges (1969). Napoléon et le Mont-Valérien [Napoléon and Mont-Valérien] (in French). Société de l'histoire de l'art français.
- Delahaye, Martine (1997). Les enfants du mont Valérien : Récits 1910-1944 [The Children of Mont Valérien: Stories 1910-1944] (in French).
- Résumé de l'histoire du Mont-Valérien et du 8e régiment de transmissions. s. l. [Summary of the history of Mont-Valérien and the 8th transmission regiment. n.l.] (in French). Armée de Terre. 2002.
- Turpin, Frédéric (2003). Le mont Valérien, de l'histoire à la mémoire [Mont Valérien, from history to memory] (in French). Les éditions du Huitième jour. ISBN 978-2-914119-28-3. Archived from the original on 2022-11-12.
- Guillot, Michel (2005). Le mont Valérien. Mémoire en images [Mont Valérien. Memory in pictures] (in French). Éditions Alan Sutton.
- Cameron, Claire (2009). Le mont Valérien, résistance, répression et mémoire : Récits 1910-1944 [Mont Valérien, resistance, repression and memory: Stories 1910-1944] (in French). Gourcuff Gradenigo. ISBN 978-2353400669.
- Krivopissko, Guy (2010). À vous et à la vie. Lettres de fusillés du Mont-Valérien (1940-1944) [To you and to life. Letters from those shot at Mont-Valérien (1940-1944)] (in French). Ministère de la Défense. OCLC 633255962.

=== History of Hauts-de-Seine ===
- Poisson, Georges (1972–1973). Inventaire des édifices religieux catholiques des Hauts-de-Seine. Suresnes [Inventory of Catholic religious buildings in Hauts-de-Seine. Suresnes] (in French). Vol. 23–24. Mémoires. pp. 94–102.
- Fourcaut, Annie (1992). "Banlieue rouge, 1920-1960 : Années Thorez, années Gabin : archétype du populaire, banc d'essai des modernités" [Red Suburbs, 1920-1960: Thorez Years, Gabin Years: Archetype of the Popular, Test Bench for Modernity]. Revue d'Histoire Moderne & Contemporaine (in French). 41 (3): 559–561.
- Fondin, Jean (1992). Hauts-de-Seine, berceau de l'automobile [Hauts-de-Seine, cradle of the automobile] (in French). ETAI. p. 257. ISBN 9782726881163.
- Monclos, Jean-Marie Pérouse de (1992). Le guide du patrimoine d'Île-de-France [The Île-de-France heritage guide] (in French). Hachette. p. 750. ISBN 9782010168116.
- Collectif (1994). Le patrimoine des communes des Hauts-de-Seine [The heritage of the Hauts-de-Seine municipalities] (in French). Charenton-le-pont: Flohic éditions. p. 444. ISBN 2-908958-95-3.
- Barthelet, Philippe (1994). Les écrivains et les Hauts-de-Seine [Writers and Hauts-de-Seine] (in French). Cyrnéa éditions. p. 135. ISBN 2-9508609-1-5.
- Prasteau, Jean (1985). Voyage insolite dans la banlieue de Paris [Unusual trip to the suburbs of Paris] (in French). Librairie académique Perrin.
- Maleyx, Jean-Noël; Dupouey, Catherine (2000). Les Hauts-de-Seine ou la nature en ville [Hauts-de-Seine or nature in the city] (in French). Conseil général des Hauts-de-Seine. ISBN 978-2-9515867-0-3.
- Conseil Général des Hauts-de-Seine (2004). Hauts-de-Seine 1964-2004 : 40 ans de mutations à la croisée des générations [Hauts-de-Seine 1964-2004: 40 years of changes at the crossroads of generations] (in French). Éditions Transversales. p. 128. ISBN 2-915798-00-1.
- Montfort, Marie; Caumont, Gisèle (2006). Patrimoine des Hauts-de-Seine : Volume II, guide des tableaux conservés dans les édifices publics et privés [Heritage of Hauts-de-Seine: Volume II, guide to paintings preserved in public and private buildings] (in French). Somogy. p. 383. ISBN 9782850569692.
- Grimaud, Renée (2013). Hauts-de-Seine insolites : Trésors cachés et lieux secrets [Unusual Hauts-de-Seine: Hidden treasures and secret places] (in French). Parigramme.
