= Kriegel =

Kriegel is a surname. Notable people with the surname include:

- Ana Kriégel (2004–2018), Russian-Irish murder victim.
- Annie Kriegel (1926–1995), French historian
- Blandine Kriegel (born 1943), French philosopher
- Danièle Kriegel (born 1950), French journalist
- František Kriegel (1908–1979), Czechoslovak politician and physician
- Hans-Peter Kriegel (born 1948), German computer scientist
- Leonard Kriegel (born 1933), American author
- Mark Kriegel, American author, journalist, and television commentator
- Maurice Kriegel-Valrimont (1914–2006), French politician
- Volker Kriegel (1943–2003), German jazz guitarist
- Irving Rhinehart Kriegel (1918-2006) US Army WWII Veteran.
