= Georges Haupt =

Romanian French historian and bibliographer of socialism

- Born: January 18, 1928; Satu Mare, Kingdom of Romania
- Died: March 14, 1978 (aged 50); Fiumicino Airport, Province of Rome, Italy
- Other names: George Haupt, Gheorghe Mathe Haupt, György Máthé Haupt, M. Haupt Gheorghe

Academic background
- Education: Bolyai University; Leningrad State University; University of Paris
- Influences: Marc Bloch, Petre Constantinescu-Iași, Lucien Goldmann, James Guillaume, Ernst Jäckh, Ernest Labrousse, Rosa Luxemburg, Franz Mehring, Max Nettlau, Jules-Louis Puech, David Riazanov, Arthur Rosenberg

Academic work
- Era: 20th century
- School or tradition: Marxist historiography; National communism; Revisionist Marxism; Post-Marxism; Liberal socialism
- Institutions: University of Bucharest; Romanian Academy; École pratique des hautes études School for Advanced Studies in the Social Sciences
- Main interests: History of socialism, political history, labor history, prosopography, Russian studies, nationalism studies, history of literature, Romanian literature, Hungarian literature
- Influenced: Michael Löwy, Claudie Weill

Georges Haupt, born Gheorghe Mathe Haupt, also known as George or György Máthé Haupt (January 18, 1928 – March 14, 1978), was Romanian and French historian of socialism, publisher and journalist, politically active in the Romanian Communist Party until 1958. Of Hungarian- and Romanian-Jewish extraction, he was the only member of his family to survive the Holocaust—deported by the Nazified Hungarian Kingdom in May 1944, he was held in extermination camps, and finally integrated with the Buchenwald resistance network. He chose to settle in the Kingdom of Romania, which was then under a Soviet occupation, and which became a communist country in early 1948. As an affiliate of the governing party (known as the "Workers' Party" for much of his career), Haupt was involved in the transition to Marxist historiography and contributed to official propaganda, writing mostly in Romanian. After a stint at Bolyai University, he completed his studies at Leningrad State University, and published some of his research in the Soviet Union; his writings were generally focused on political, literary and labor history, evidencing the civilizational ties between the Russian Empire and the Balkans. While confirming to the normative requirements of Stalinism, and working under official historians such as Petre Constantinescu-Iași, Haupt thus began exploring his own interest in the "geography of socialism".

After 1954, Haupt rallied with Constantinescu-Iași and Andrei Oțetea, in curbing the influence exercised in academia by Mihail Roller. While he initially opposed Roller from a Marxist-Leninist position, he soon became supportive of De-Stalinization and "national Marxism" throughout the Eastern Bloc. Though he became a suspect for his presence in Budapest during the Hungarian Revolution of 1956, and his prolonged contacts with the anti-Stalinist left, he was still allowed to climb through the Romanian political hierarchy; upon ousting Roller, the communist apparatus had embraced a Romanian national-communism, which discovered Haupt as a contextual ally. Haupt himself preferred liberal Marxism with a focus on proletarian internationalism, and was therefore pushed into an ideological conflict with the national-communists. He and his wife, Ruth Fabian, ultimately defected to France in 1958, being welcomed into the scholarly community of that country. Assisted by Jean Maitron and Ernest Labrousse, Georges found permanent employment at the École pratique des hautes études, later switching to its successor, the School for Advanced Studies in the Social Sciences. He received a Ph.D. from the University of Paris.

In this final stage of his career, Haupt valued historical objectivity, which he believed could be developed as a self-critical component within militant Marxism. He questioned the myth-making narratives of all major leftist dogmas, testing their validity against the historical record. In his monographs on the Second International, he rediscovered the correspondence between Camille Huysmans and Vladimir Lenin, which allowed him to expose inaccuracies in the standard Marxist-Leninist accounts; he also curated a critical edition of autobiographical writings by the Old Bolsheviks, thus drawing attention to the ideological pluralism of Soviet Russia in the 1920s. Haupt's overall approach was informed by dissident Marxists, primarily Lucien Goldmann, Franz Mehring, David Riazanov, and Arthur Rosenberg. An early contributor to Le Maitron, he was involved in establishing an international network of scholars, using his familiarity with a wide array of languages; he worked with François Maspero on a corpus of forgotten socialist literature, with Lelio Basso on editions of Rosa Luxemburg's letters, and with Claudie Weill and Michael Löwy on a large-scale analysis about the interplay between "Marxisms" and nationalist movements. He died of a lingering heart disease while at Fiumicino Airport, leaving behind a number of incomplete projects (with editions continuing to be published into the 1990s).

== Biography ==
=== Early life ===
Himself a social historian, Anson Rabinbach defines his colleague Georges Haupt as Jewish, but "quintessentially [an] 'uprooted' intellectual", "torn from his national culture by Nazi barbarism." The future scholar was born on January 18, 1928, at Satu Mare in Maramureș. According to labor historian Hernán Camarero, his was a "typical Jewish bourgeois family of Central Europe", straddling several cultural zones. Haupt's mentor Ernest Labrousse reports that, as a child, he had already learned four languages—speaking German to his father, Hungarian to his mother, and Romanian to various members of his Transylvanian community, while having also picked up Yiddish from his family connections. At the age of sixteen, his native region, along with the rest of Northern Transylvania, were assigned to Regency Hungary, as part of the Second Vienna Award; as a result of Hungarian extermination policies, in May 1944 Haupt was deported to Auschwitz with his entire family, including a young brother. He was the only one of them to survive and, according to various of his biographers, was freed upon the camp's liberation later that year. In 1952, Haupt himself provided a different account, namely that he had managed to survive a succession of extermination camps; Camarero suggests that he was moved from Auschwitz to Buchenwald, where his joining of the communist resistance network ensured his ultimate survival, down to the arrival of the United States Army. Haupt also clarified that his imprisonment ended at Buchenwald, whence he was set free, together with the other 10,000 inmates, in 1945.

In May 1945, shortly before the capitulation of Germany, Haupt was recovering along the Elbe, in Soviet-held territory. According to his own reports, he happened to look on as the United States Air Force bombed bridges in an apparent effort to stall a Soviet offensive. He returned to Northern Transylvania (which was assigned back to Romania in 1947), reportedly shunning offers to settle in the West. An adherent of the local Communist Party (which rebranded itself as the "Workers' Party", PMR), he began his higher education locally, at the Bolyai University of Cluj. He was then sent into the Soviet Union, at Leningrad State University, to specialize in the modern history of the Russian Empire and the Balkans. Haupt's first published work was a Hungarian-language article, in 1949 (when he was aged 21), but for nearly a decade after he wrote almost exclusively in Romanian, reflecting his academic career in the Romanian People's Republic. Also in 1949, Studii, the PMR history journal, published his article on the Romanian unification of 1859 and its being welcomed by the Russian magazine Sovremennik. The piece was signed as "M. Haupt Gheorghe".

As a student at Leningrad, Haupt acquired proficiency in Russian, and, as he put it in a 1952 interview, "managed to complete a highly scientific form of training". In March 1950, he inaugurated the university's permanent section for the study of literature and languages in people's democracies—with a lecture on Sándor Petőfi as a "revolutionary democratic thinker". His other focus was on the Moldavian and Wallachian revolutions of 1848. Taking his lead from the Romanian communist academic Petre Constantinescu-Iași, he reviewed these events as largely inspired by Russian liberalism. In early 1951, Studii hosted Dimitrie Cantemir's political essay, Monarchiarum Physica Examinatio, which had been discovered and translated into Romanian by Haupt. In a 2023 article, Cantemir expert Ștefan Lemny revisited Haupt's introduction to this text as a sample of Soviet-style history, as dictated by Mihail Roller. According to Lemny, Haupt replicated propaganda against the old-regime historians, castigating Nicolae Iorga and Ștefan Ciobanu for having "falsified" the record; specifically, he argued that Cantemir had been a committed Russophile, and had been influenced by Russian philosophy down to his death.

On his return to Bucharest in August 1952, the Union of Working Youth presented Haupt with a diploma for excellence, at a ceremony during which he was reportedly greeted with "thunderous applause." As part of his study trips, he went to the German Democratic Republic in summer 1954, visiting East Berlin, Dresden, Leipzig, and the Harz. He took his graduation diploma in 1955, and returned to teach in Romania, expressing his wish to "participate in my homeland's cultural revolution." For a while, he was editor of Studii and lecturer at the University of Bucharest. His new work, mainly carried out through the PMR's Institute of the History of the Labor Movement, was almost entirely focused on the history of Romania in a "universal context".

=== Stalinist writings and signs of dissent ===
From 1953, Haupt was employed by the Romanian Academy's Institute of History, chairing its Modern and Contemporary Section. At that stage, the Romanian academic field had been fully subjugated by Roller, who verified the work of other historians based on their commitment to the replication of Soviet scholarship. In a 2017 overview of the early 1950s, scholar Gabriel Moisa refers to Haupt as one of Roller's "lieutenants" in the "effort of wiping out our national values". The category, as defined by Moisa, also includes Constantinescu-Iași, Iosif Chișinevschi, Miron Constantinescu, and Leonte Răutu. Camarero similarly notes that Haupt was "a sort of 'official historian'", one of several "controversial aspects" from his work at the apex of Romanian Stalinism. Historian János Jemnitz, who witnessed several of Haupt's visits in the Hungarian People's Republic, notes that Haupt was indeed credited as an official scholar, but never acted accordingly; he claims that, after the "doctors' plot" affair of 1953, "the air began to freeze around Haupt."

As acknowledged by Moisa, the first "consistent" criticism of Roller, and in particular of Roller's periodization of Romanian history, appeared as an article in Studii's second issue for 1953—with Haupt as one of the three authors, alongside N. Crețu and M. Frunză. In November 1954, Haupt joined other scientists, including Constantinescu-Iași, Barbu Câmpina, Constantin Daicoviciu, Vasile Maciu, Alexandru Vianu, and Solomon Știrbu, in questioning Rollerian theses. As argued by researcher Felician Velimirovici, they did so from various positions, since the younger ones among them were "zealous, at times more radical" than Roller himself, and were allowed to act by the PMR ideologist Răutu. In the presentation he delivered for that group, Haupt accused Roller of mismanaging the Institute's resources and of "petty bourgeois residues" in his selection of cadres. The following year, with the onset of De-Stalinization, historian Andrei Oțetea managed to renew these attacks. As noted by eyewitness Pavel Țugui, Haupt was one of the young intellectuals who assisted him directly. Țugui also reports that Haupt and other scholars eventually shied away from visibly endorsing Oțetea's damning report on Rollerian practices, which was only signed by Câmpina.

Haupt's own treatise on the links between the Narodniks and the Romanian left-radicals was published by the Romanian Academy in 1955, as Din istoricul legăturilor revoluționare româno–ruse. Mainly focused on revising the life and work of Constantin Dobrogeanu Gherea (presented here as the creator of a socialist movement in a "backward" country), it came as a direct challenge to Roller's theses. Moreover, as noted by Andrea Panaccione and other scholars, Din istoricul had managed to subvert the history of Romania–Russia relations, an "obligatory" subject of late-stage Stalinism, by becoming the first of Haupt's monographs on the "geography of socialism". The volume was nominated for a state prize, but omitted after the spiteful Roller published three pseudonymous reviews, all of them negative. Haupt's work was also criticized by literary researcher Dan Deșliu, for a fragment which claimed to have discovered an early Romanian poem on the proletarian condition, published in 1877 by S. Miculescu. As Deșliu showed, the poem was in fact about peasants. Haupt's book, which also dealt in passing with the circulation of clandestine Marxist literature in Bessarabia Governorate, placed much emphasis on Nicolae Zubcu-Codreanu's contribution as a Narodnik book-smuggler. This perspective was embraced by Soviet historian Ilie Budac, and became "dogma" in the Moldavian SSR; it was revisited by the non-Marxist Artur Leșcu, who notes that both Haupt and Budac had obfuscated the pioneering role of anarchist Zamfir Arbore, and had failed to inform their readers that book-smuggling was a near-constant phenomenon in that border region.

A passage in one of Haupt's later articles indicates that he was present for a secret meeting in March 1956, at which PMR General Secretary Gheorghe Gheorghiu-Dej informed a select audience on The Secret Speech and its content. According to this testimony, he was the only one present who pressed the party leadership to embrace change. He was disappointed to discover that Dej would only allow reform to cover a certain set of policies, by creating an "alliance between the apparatus and the bourgeois intelligentsia" around the tenets of Romanian nationalism, or national-communism. Haupt was in Budapest during the Hungarian Revolution of 1956, leading the Romanian regime to identify him as a would-be dissident. Camarero notes that he was affiliated with the anti-Stalinist left, through the Petőfi Circle, and that he was only chased out of Budapest in October—when the Soviets invaded Hungary.

=== Revisionist turn and exile ===
By April 1957, Haupt had been co-opted on the editorial board of the official Romanian historical treatise, working under a four-man panel of editors-in-chief (Constantinescu-Iași, Daicoviciu, Oțetea, and Roller). He personally handled the work's third volume. There followed a scholarly dispute over Romanian participation in World War I, which exposed him to further scrutiny: Roller pointed to Haupt as having endorsed or tolerated the notion that Romanian actions had been justified by a national interest (against the Soviet reading of World War I as "imperialistic"). Rabinbach recounts that Haupt himself viewed the 1956 events as an opportunity to either push for complete De-Stalinization or seek ways of finding refuge abroad. He came into contact with a French historian of anarchism, Jean Maitron, who was visiting Romania, and who assisted him in this effort.

As Roller was stripped of his offices, Oțetea took over as editor of Studii in early 1958, and made Haupt his assistant editor; his final Romanian-language contribution appeared in Moscow, also that year. Dej, who had been vexed by Roller's interviews with party rivals, now populated the Institute of the History with reliable cadres, allowing the anti-Rollerist Haupt to achieve tenure around July 1958. The regime allowed him and his wife, the art historian Ruth Fabian, to board a cruise ship for a vacation in the Mediterranean. Following news of a purge carried out by Dej, refused to return, and, in August, applied for political asylum in France; his wife followed suit. Oțetea and Haupt had only put out one issue of Studii: as part of the purge, Răutu had intervened to change the journal's editorial direction. The second issue, appearing later that year, had Constantinescu-Iași and E. Stănescu as their respective replacements.

Jemnitz, who continued to identify as a Haupt disciple, notes that this break marked the start of Haupt's "real life", allowing him to write freely on the subjects that preoccupied him most. Reportedly, he and Fabian were offered their first paying jobs by Maitron. Haupt immediately established contacts with Labrousse, who described their subsequent relationship as "fraternal". Also according to Labrousse, Haupt may have chosen to continue his work from Paris because of the prevailing Francophilia in his native Romania; Camarero disputes this, arguing that he was primarily impressed by the quality of research at the Institut d'Histoire Sociale. While discarding Marxism-Leninism, Haupt continued to identify as a Marxist, or more generically a socialist, throughout his life in the West. He also acknowledged that the ideology had diverged into "Marxisms", but had equal respect for its various doyens—as noted by Jemnitz, he was equally respectful of Camille Huysmans, Jean Jaurès, Karl Kautsky, Vladimir Lenin, Rosa Luxemburg, Charles Rappoport, Christian Rakovsky and Édouard Vaillant, all of whom were topics of his biographical research. Rabinbach adds that Haupt was particularly influenced by David Riazanov and Arthur Rosenberg, emulating their "passionate combination of scholarly integrity and socialist commitment". Panaccione also notes: "Haupt recognized Rosenberg [...] as the engaged witness, capable of turning himself into a historian, and more generally as an example of the staunchly critical history of socialism, as informed by the political passion of a non-enlisted militant."

Camarero discusses the mature Haupt as a libertarian socialist within post-Marxism, whose beliefs centered on "the possibility of a society without oppression". Several of Haupt's writings, as read by Rabinbach, suggest that he questioned both the unavoidable success of the working class and the worship of tradition. His critique of the idealized workers' tradition found inspiration in Luxemburg's critique of "passeism", and was strengthened by his personal observation of Joseph Stalin's "cynical manipulation of the past". Another detected influence on him was Lucien Goldmann, a personal friend, who had fully embraced Revisionist Marxism. The form of socialism advocated by both scholars was "independent in spirit, un-dogmatic, historical and critical". In Haupt's case, this also meant viewing labor history as largely unrelated to the activity of "institutionalized parties", which had been central in all previous Marxist narratives.

As a polyglot who "was literate in almost every European language and could speak quite a few of them", Haupt was also strongly committed to proletarian internationalism, and "putting every language at the service of international socialism." According to Rabinbach, he also regarded social history-writing as both a "personal passion" and a "collective endeavor", personally creating a community of historians with a similar range of interests; "he had a remarkable ability to spark, to fertilize and to create links across the globe. [...] Borders and distances were almost non-existent for him." Labrousse reports that his pupil had passed examinations in Serbian and Bulgarian, could be heard speaking Turkish and "Flemish", and eventually became acquainted with "all European and American languages, from the Ural to the Pacific." Rabinbach heard Haupt conversing in Hungarian, Polish and Russian, while noting that his English "was not yet firm" when he began lecturing in it. The same author notes that there Haupt himself had placed ideological and methodological curbs on this approach: "As a Rumanian he could not help being sensitive to the dilemmas of national traditions in the face of 'Great Power' socialism. He was particularly aware, then, of the triumph of nationally oriented labor parties over the potential, yet never achieved, Internationalism of the prewar period. [...] [H]is view [was] that national intellectual traditions shaped the labor movement and its constitution as much or more than any adherence to doctrine." Rabinach notes that Haupt tried to balance these two positions by encouraging an internationalism based on "cooperation and respect", criticizing "national Marxism" as going too far in its attempts to revitalize theory. In this, he resembled Luxemburg and the council communism, but also the Frankfurt School, the Budapest School, and the leftist groups of Soviet dissidents.

=== French creative period ===
Haupt's editorial debut in French was a bibliography of Soviet history, taken up by Les Cahiers du Monde Russe in 1958. Some two years later, he and his wife both found permanent employment at the École pratique des hautes études (EPHE), within a section dealing with Soviet and Central European history. In 1962, Georges Haupt joined the editorial staff of Maitron's Le Mouvement Social, and a year later was assigned to a similar position at the Cahiers du Monde Russe et Soviétique. Taking his Ph. D. at the University of Paris, he produced a thesis on the Second International, with Labrousse as his adviser. In his preface to the published version, Labrousse noted that the work would allow the proletariat to discover its own "heroic history", "built on the completeness of the sources." The work offered a new periodization, seeing international socialism as divided into two epochs by the fin de siècle—with the successes of reformist (non-revolutionary) socialism, the emergence of divergent national cultures into the internationalist movement, and the creation of Marxist groups in the distant world's colonial empires. Haupt was also explicitly against the narratives promoted by Jean Longuet and G. D. H. Cole, which had filled a documentary void at the central level by focusing on the history of individual socialist parties and their leaders; instead, he advocated for "a complex methodology, one that takes into account the development of the economic-industrial structure, the composition of the working class, class struggle, political struggles, and the very development of socialist thought."

Around that time, Haupt contacted Huysmans, who allowed him to publish letters he had received from Lenin (a source that no other author had been previously allowed to consult); since the Comintern archive had been sealed by Soviet censorship, this documentary fund, effectively rediscovered by Haupt, was one of the few records detailing the early conflicts between social-democrats and communists. It fostered a reexamination of the Bolshevik movement within the larger context of European socialism, thus overturning Soviets efforts at keeping the two areas of study completely separate. Another book put out by Haupt switched focus on Otto Bauer and the "nationalities question". It was read and appreciated by publicist François Maspero, who then befriended Haupt. This resulted in his employment by Maspero's company, which was then "one of the French left's most important publishing houses". In 1963, he and Maspero started The Socialist Library Collection, which was explicitly focused on reintroducing the public to works that had been forgotten or discarded. The first such contribution was The ABC of Communism, by Nikolai Bukharin and Yevgeni Preobrazhensky. He also continued to cultivate his friendship with Labrousse, and in 1967 was welcomed as a board member at Labrousse's Society for Jauréssian Studies.

Like various of his older colleagues (including Cole, Julius Braunthal, and James Joll), Haupt rebutted Comintern propaganda, as well as left-communist and Trotskyist narratives, about the Second International having "betrayed its own principles". Instead, he proposed a model in which the organization had naturally divided itself into newly solidified ideological camps—principally German Socialist (which had also subsumed Balkan movements with its intellectual prestige), but also Austromarxist, syndicalist, as well as Bolshevik. His 1965 work, Le Congrès manqué, examined the International's crumbling, and the competition put up by the Sacred Union, during the early stages of World War I. After describing the "psychological climate and theoretical motivations" that had precipitated the debacle, he also listed the attempts to rekindle internationalism during the actual war. By showing the organization's inner confusion in tandem with Lenin's attacks on its leadership, he entered a major dispute between the socialists of the 1960s and '70s. Overall, however, Haupt displayed understanding for the core Leninist tenets, seeing them as emerging from a "realistic policy".

With his lectures at the EPHE and then the School for Advanced Studies in the Social Sciences (where he received a studies' manager position in 1969), Haupt took up the task of bridging the gap between social history and the history of Marxism, which meant covering "the geography, penetration and expansion zones and forms of Marxism". One tome expanding on this focus was co-written with Madeleine Rébérieux in 1967, and covered Second-International policies as they related to Asia. It was the first study connecting the European metropolis with colonial or peripheral socialism, discussing the Social Democratic Association of the Dutch East Indies, the impact of left-wing ideologies among Russian Muslims, and the history of Philippine anarchism, as well as tracing the "ambiguous" case of socialism in the Maghreb. Haupt's interest in geographical analysis also implied turning his focus to current affairs, as with an August 1968 article on the de-satellization of Romania, carried by the Revue Française de Science Politique.

=== Final years and death ===
Alongside Jean-Jacques Marie (who was a committed Trotskyist), Haupt also rediscovered, translated, and reprinted portions of the Granat Encyclopedic Dictionary that comprised autobiographical entries by the Old Bolsheviks, detailing their activities before and during the October Revolution. The volume he produced in 1969, Les Bolchéviques par eux-mémes, was a "a revelation in the West", since no such coverage existed for any other European revolution. As noted by Panaccione, the work sampled Marc Bloch's approach to historiography (showing instances in which the autobiographies were unreliable), but also evidenced the freedom of discourse that still existed at the time when Granat had been put together. From 1971, Haupt was a contributor to Maitron's French labor encyclopedia, eponymously known as Le Maitron. He and Maitron contributed several volumes, beginning with one detailing the biographies of Austrian socialists. Camarero commends this effort, seeing it as primarily a contribution in social history, or a "workers' prosopography".

At the School for Advances Studies, Haupt had made Claudie Weill his assistant. By 1970, they were involved in transmitting samizdat works by Soviet thinkers, and publishing them in the outside world; Haupt personally handled Alexander Nekrich's June 22, 1941, translating it into French and German. As part of his "almost militant" effort to familiarize Westerners with the history of Soviet dissidence, in 1972 Haupt also prefaced translations of works by Roy Medvedev. In the mid-1970s, he was joined by Weill and Michael Löwy on a project research specifically dedicated to untangling Marxist attitudes toward nationalism, and more specifically the questions presented by the Marxist notion of some peoples having no historical role.

The Romanian academic press occasionally discussed Haupt's new contributions—in 1977, Anale de Istorie described his presence and contribution at the Marxist Studies Week in Urbino, where Romania had been represented by Cristian Popișteanu and Florian Tănăsescu. Haupt was nonetheless criticized in his native country, which had by then expanded on the national-communist experiment. As one of the regime's historians, Mircea Mușat contended in 1972 that Haupt had been "unscientific" in his discussion of the Romanian labor movement, which appeared in his work as created through external pressures in the mid-1870s. Mușat had been tasked with establishing that Romanian trade unionism had deeper roots. Naturalized French, Haupt carried on with his work across several continents. He greatly appreciated Italy (seeing it as the home of a "Marxist renaissance" under Enrico Berlinguer), with his first translation of the Second-International book appearing at Einaudi in 1978. As editor of Luxemburg's papers, which appeared in print in 1976–1977, he tied a friendship with the fellow anti-Stalinist Lelio Basso. The two men shared a passion for Luxemburg and Franz Mehring as exponents of an "alternative revolutionary socialism".

The Romanian scholar had several six-month stints as a visiting professor—successively at Wisconsin, Northwestern, SUNY Binghamton, FU Berlin, Sapienza, and Zurich; Haupt also lived for a while in Brazil. He was finally drawn toward Israel, which "seems to have become increasingly important to Georges in the last years of his life." According to Rabinbach, he once visited a Hasidic synagogue in Mea Shearim, just so that he could converse with its rabbi in "his native dialect." This impressed the rabbi, who asked him to remain in Jerusalem "for a few days more." When Haupt asked why this was necessary, "[t]he Rabbi answered that if he stayed he was certain to witness the coming of the Messiah, which had obviously drawn [Haupt] to Jerusalem, to that synagogue". On March 14, 1978, Haupt died unexpectedly at Fiumicino Airport outside Rome, after having attended a conference; according to Jemnitz, the recorded myocardial infarction was in fact the effect of unbearable exhaustion. According to Camarero: "it is not implausible that an illness he contracted as a young man in the Nazi concentration camps may have had an impact."

== Legacy ==
In a special issue, Le Movement Social featured messages of mourning from various socialist theorists and historians—including Franz Marek (who, as Rébérieux notes, only survived Haupt by a few months). Also contributing to that issue, Rabinach noted Haupt's efforts in "reconstruct[ing] the Socialist historical tradition", a "political commitment to replacing myth with truth whatever the consequences." Historian Michel Dreyfus commends Haupt for managing to elevate socialism and social democracy into worthy historical subjects, helping them win back ground lost to communism—and, with this, inaugurating a "historiographic mutation" that survived him. Haupt's death left several projects on hold, many of which could not be completed. He and Jemnitz were scheduled to finish work on a Hungarian-themed entries in Le Maitron. He had also worked with Eric Hobsbawm and others on the massive History of Marxism, which eventually came out in the early 1980s, as did his collaborative work with Weil and Löwy.

The Socialist Library Collection came to an end in 1980, when it put out a collection of Haupt's own texts, as L'Historien et le mouvement social. He had prepared monographs on Rakovsky and Rappaport, both of which were only published in 1991. One of his posthumous articles, published in 1986, explained his commitment to Riazanov and Mehring, but also to James Guillaume, Ernst Jäckh, Jules-Louis Puech, and Max Nettlau, all of whom represented the "respect for truth". He opposed them to the "ideological bias" of ideological traditions—Marxist, but also anarcho-collectivist and libertarian socialist. According to Camarero, Haupt's work on the national question is a continuation of Roman Rosdolsky's efforts, within its Marxist settings, but also an anticipation of major works in nationalism studies, as produced by Benedict Anderson and Ernest Gellner.

Haupt's legacy in literature includes a portrayal in a 1950s roman à clef, Meeting at the Last Judgment, put out by the Romanian former Marxist, Petru Dumitriu, who had himself defected to the West. Haupt is identifiable as "Prospero Dobre", whom literary critic Adrian Dinu Rachieru describes as a "crushed man", having fallen victim to the regime's injustices. Haupt's name continued to be featured in disputes between the national-communists in Romania and the anti-communist diaspora—respectively represented by Artur Silvestri and Vlad Georgescu. In 1984, Georgescu argued that there was continuity between the 1950s Stalinists and the 1980s nationalists; in his retrospective of Stalinism, he mentioned Haupt as a negative example. Silvestri, who defended national-communism as genuinely anti-Stalinist, commented: "Like so many other dogmatists, from so many a cultural field, [Haupt] is presently [sic] a fellow 'exile' of Vlad Georgescu's: two former Proletkult-type authors, 'liberalized' but fully conserving their erstwhile manias." In a 1998 commemorative article, Jemnitz regretfully noted that young and middle-aged scholars no longer remembered Haupt, or questioned his importance—though his 1960s study of the International was still "an indispensable source." A detailed account of Haupt's career in Romania is given in the memoirs published by Florin Constantiniu (2008).
