= Alexandre Adler =

French journalist and historian (1950–2023)

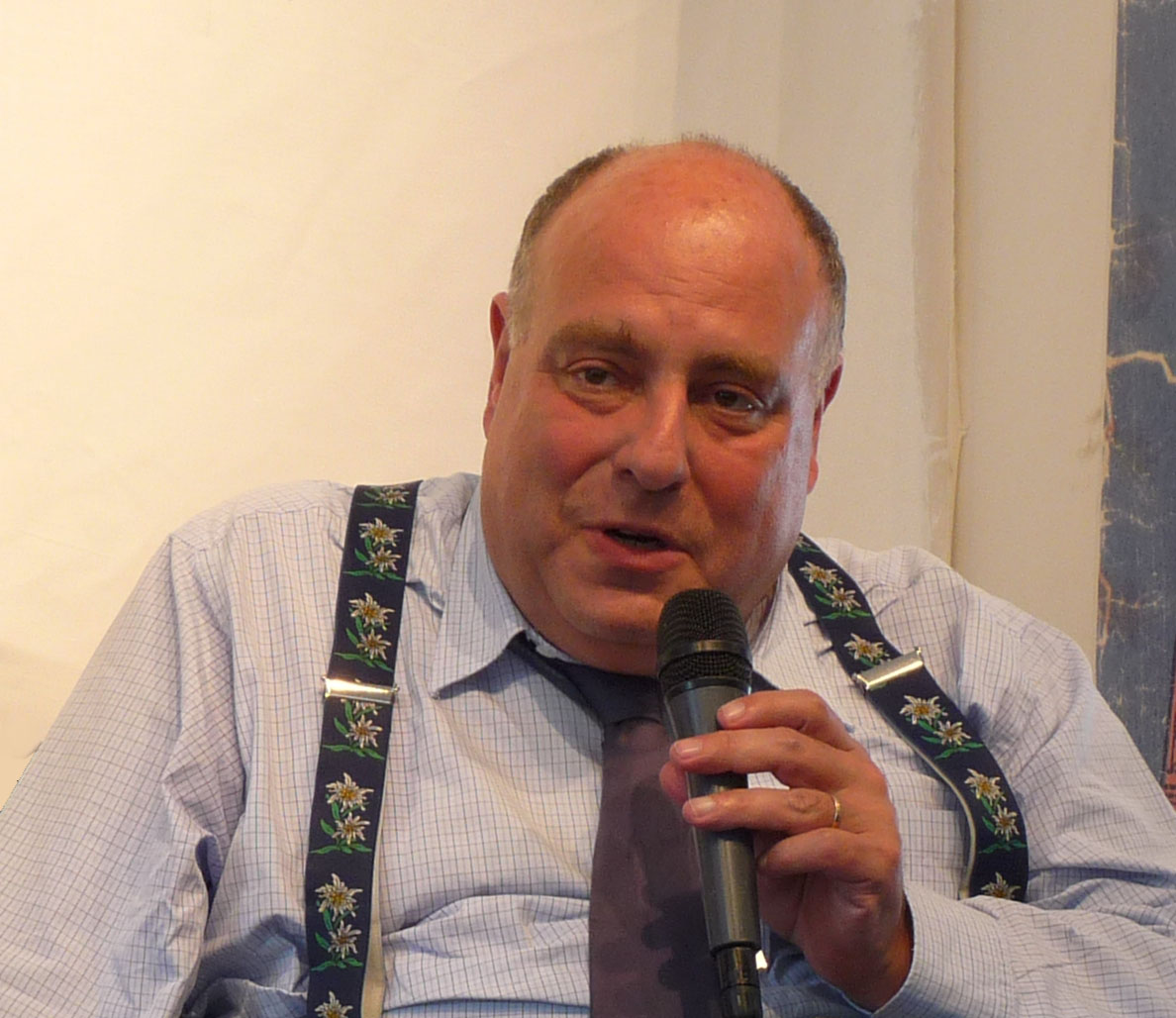
- Adler in 2009
- Born: Alexandre Gérard Adler; 23 September 1950; Paris, France
- Died: 18 July 2023 (aged 72); Paris, France
- Education: École Normale Supérieure
- Occupation: Historian
- Spouse: Blandine Kriegel
- Website: alexandreadler.com

Alexandre Adler (23 September 1950 – 18 July 2023) was a French historian, journalist and expert of contemporary geopolitics, the former USSR, and the Middle East. He was a Knight of the Legion of Honour (2002). A Maoist in his youth and then a member of the Communist Party (PCF), he shifted to the right at the end of the 1970s and later became close to U.S. neoconservatives, as did his wife Blandine Kriegel (daughter of the communist Resistant Maurice Kriegel-Valrimont). Adler was the counsellor of Roger Cukiermann, chairman of the Conseil Représentatif des Institutions juives de France (CRIF, Representative Council of Jewish Institutions of France).

== Biography ==
Born in 1950 in Paris into a German-Jewish family, which survived World War II and the Holocaust, Adler was a history graduate of the École normale supérieure (1969–1974). He directed the chair for International Relations of France's Ministry of Defense Interarmy College of Defense (1992–1998) where he remained a professor of higher military learning.

After working with the French daily Libération (1982–1992), Adler went on to become editorial director of Courrier International (1992–2002), a weekly selection of significant articles from the international press. In the 1980s, Adler played a prominent role in L’Affaire Manouchian as the debate about who betrayed Missak Manouchian was known. Adler was a defender of Boris Holban against the allegation that he was the police informer who betrayed Manouchian, writing a series of articles in 1985-86 that argued that Holban was not in position to betray Manouchian even if he had wanted to.

Adler served as an editorialist for the French daily paper Le Monde and worked with several French weeklies, including Le Point and L'Express. He sat on the editorial board of the conservative French daily Le Figaro.

Alexandre Adler died in Paris on 18 July 2023, aged 72.

== Bibliography ==
Adler was the author of J'ai vu finir le monde ancien (I Witnessed the End of the Ancient World, 2001), a geopolitical analysis of the consequences of the September 11 attacks in 2001, L'odyssée américaine (The American Odyssey, 2004), a historical reflection on American politics refuting the commonplace notion of the « American empire », and Rendez-vous avec l'Islam (Encounter with Islam, 2005), an analysis of Islam's return as a historical actor on the world scene.

== Positions ==
Adler was one of the rare French intellectuals to defend George W. Bush's candidacy against Al Gore during the 2000 presidential election. He has qualified the altermondialist movement as an "enemy of freedom," and supported both the war in Afghanistan and the Iraq War. His positions have sometimes led to polemics, such as his qualification of France Inter radio journalist Daniel Mermet as a "Brejnevian journalist," head of Politis newspaper Bernard Langlois as a "repugnant journalist" (journaliste répugnant) and Rony Brauman, former president of Médecins Sans Frontières France as a "Jewish traitor" because of his criticisms of Israel and the US' policies.

== Predictions ==
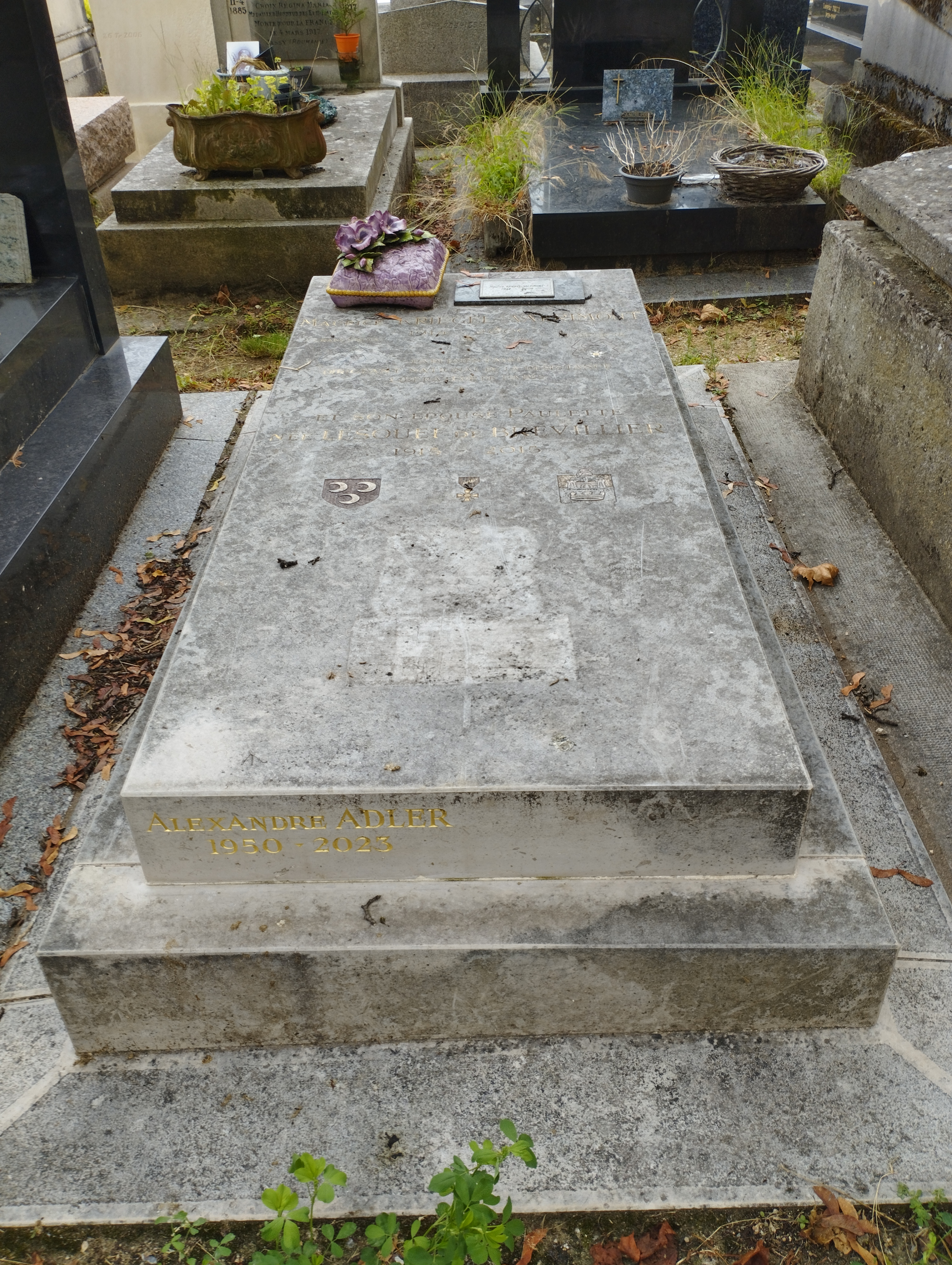
Alexandre Adler's grave

Adler had predicted John Kerry's large victory over George W. Bush during the 2004 presidential election. A month before the beginning of operations against Iraq, he declared to Le Figaro (8 March 2003): "The war might well not take place." Following the Italian 2001 general election won by Silvio Berlusconi, he first declared that the victory of Forza Italia's leader was a "moral catastrophe... One can approach the figures of Mussolini and Berlusconi", before stating, three weeks later: "Berlusconi's total victory will finally permit to eradicate the [Northern] League... It is in itself a victory of democracy."

== Honours and awards ==
- Chevalier of the Order of the Legion of Honour
- Officier of the Ordre National du Mérite

== Articles ==
- Bowd, Gavin (December 2014). "Romanians of the French Resistance". French History. 28 (4): 541–559. doi:10.1093/fh/cru080. hdl:10023/9636.
