= Michael Löwy =

French-Brazilian sociologist and philosopher (born 1938)

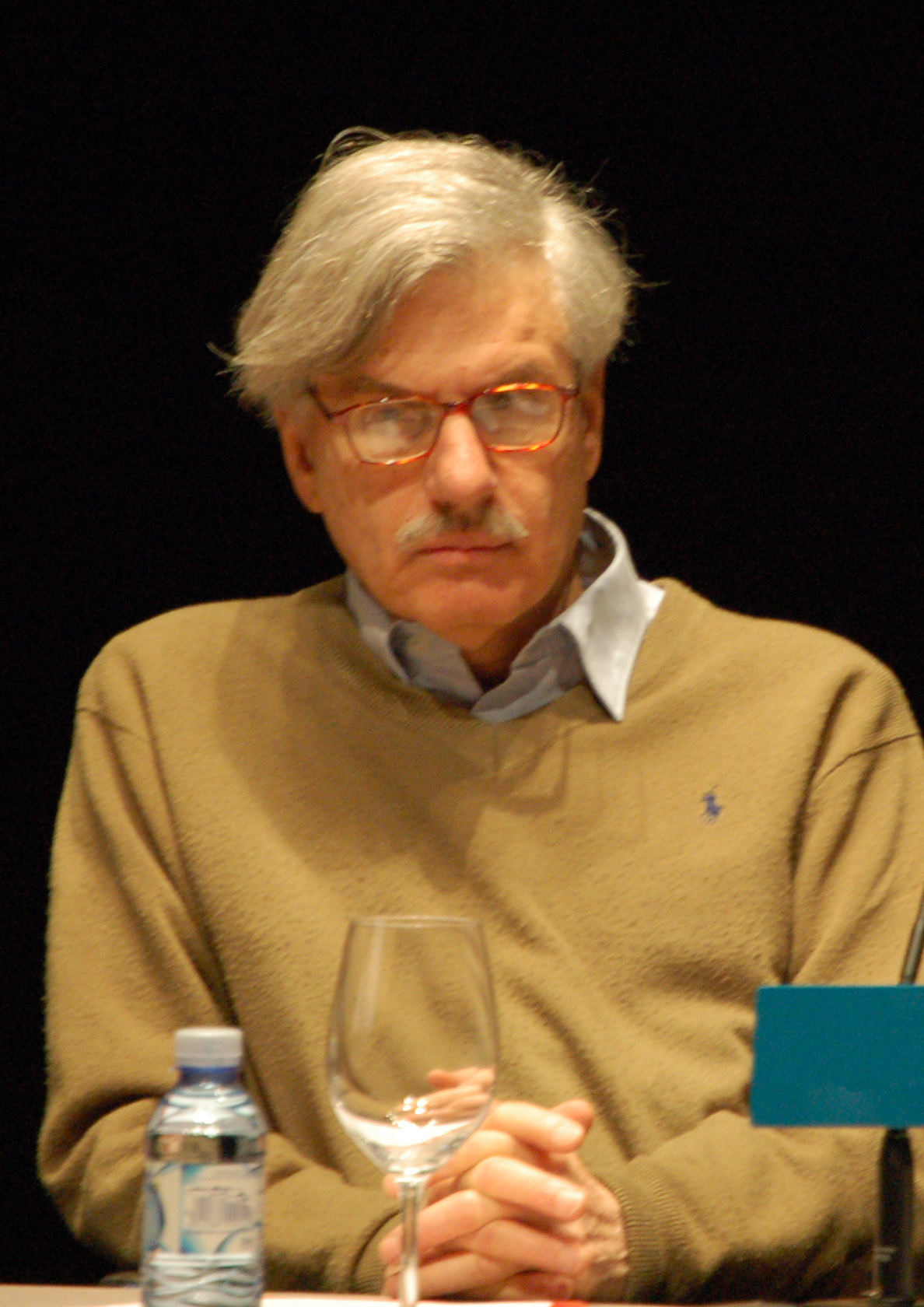
- Löwy in 2010
- Born: 6 May 1938 (age 88); São Paulo, Third Brazilian Republic

Education
- Education: School for Advanced Studies in the Social Sciences (PhD, 1964); University of Paris V (DrE, 1975)
- Thesis: Révolution communiste et auto-émancipation du prolétariat dans l’œuvre du jeune Marx (1964)
- Doctoral advisor: Lucien Goldmann

Philosophical work
- Era: 20th-/21st-century philosophy
- Region: Western philosophy
- School: Continental philosophy Western Marxism
- Institutions: University of Paris VIII
- Doctoral students: Enzo Traverso

Michael Löwy (born 6 May 1938) is a French-Brazilian Marxist sociologist and philosopher. He is emeritus research director in social sciences at the French National Centre for Scientific Research (CNRS) and lectures at the School for Advanced Studies in the Social Sciences (EHESS) in Paris, France. The author of books on Karl Marx, Che Guevara, Liberation theology, György Lukács, Walter Benjamin, José Carlos Mariátegui, Lucien Goldmann and Franz Kafka, he received the CNRS Silver Medal in 1994.

== Academic career ==
A descendant of Jewish immigrants from Vienna, Löwy grew up in São Paulo, Brazil, becoming a committed socialist at 16 (1954), when he discovered the writings of Rosa Luxemburg. He attended the University of São Paulo, where he studied under Fernando Henrique Cardoso, Florestan Fernandes and Antônio Cândido. He got his license in Social Sciences in 1960 and lectured in sociology for a year at the university of São José do Rio Preto (State of São Paulo).

In 1961 he received a scholarship for a doctorate in Paris, France, which he did under the guidance of the well-known Marxist philosopher and sociologist of culture Lucien Goldmann, who had a lasting influence on his views. He received his PhD from the School for Advanced Studies in the Social Sciences in 1964, with a thesis on Communist Revolution and Self-Emancipation of the Proletariat in the Work of the Young Marx. The dissertation was published in 1970 as The Young Marx's Theory of Revolution (La Théorie de la Révolution chez le jeune Marx).

Soon afterwards, Löwy went to Israel where his family had migrated. He learned Hebrew and became a lecturer in political philosophy at the University of Tel Aviv, but his political views led to problems, and the university refused to renew his contract in 1968. In an act of solidarity, he was invited to lecture at the University of Manchester, where he became assistant to the sociologist and founder of the New Left, Peter Worsley (1968–1969).

In 1969, Löwy returned to Paris to work with Nicos Poulantzas at Paris 8 University, and from that moment on established himself definitively in France. In the 1970s he worked, under the direction of Louis-Vincent Thomas, on his Habilitation on György Lukács, presented in 1975 at the Paris Descartes University, and graduated with honours. Löwy lectured in sociology at the University of Paris 8 until 1978 when he was admitted as a researcher at the CNRS.

In 1981, Löwy began also to lecture at the EHESS in Paris; he has also been invited to lecture at Stanford University, UC Berkeley, University of Michigan at Ann Arbor, Columbia University and Harvard University, as well as other US Universities. In 1994 he received the CNRS Silver Medal.

He is emeritus research director in social sciences at the CNRS and teaches at the EHESS. He is member of the editorial board of the journals Archives de sciences sociales des religions, Actuel Marx, ContreTemps and Écologie et politique, as well as a fellow and regular lecturer at the International Institute for Research and Education in Amsterdam.

== Academic interests ==
Until 1985 most of Löwy's works concerned the sociological and historical study of Marxist thought. This applies not only to his doctorate on the young Marx and his Habilitation on Lukács, but to most of the essays which he published, some of which were collected in books, as well as for two anthologies, on the National Question (with Georges Haupt and Claudie Weill) and on Marxism in Latin America. Marxist epistemology also takes a central place in his work on sociology of knowledge from 1985.

The methodological orientation of his research was inspired by Goldmann's writings, particularly The Hidden God, whose approach, associating sociology and history, heterodox Marxism and German sociology, the internal study of cultural works and their connexion to the social structure, served him as starting point.

From the mid-1980s, Löwy became interested in the jewish culture that existed in Central Europe, as well as in Romantic anticapitalism and on the complex interrelations between religion and politics, particularly in Latin America. The concept of elective affinity, borrowed from Max Weber, but re-interpreted, became one of the key methodological tools of his research. His latest books concern Benjamin’s Theses on the Philosophy of History (1940), which Löwy considers as one of the most important documents of revolutionary thinking since Marx’s Theses on Feuerbach; and Kafka as an anti-authoritarian author, with Anarchist sympathies, whose novels are inspired by a sort of "religion of liberty".

In spite of the diversity of its thematic contents, most of Löwy's writing, since his PhD on Marx till now, belong to a Marxist and Historicist sociology of culture. Inspired by Lukács and Goldmann, they also refer to the great tradition of German sociology, from Weber to Karl Mannheim. Their aim is to analyse, interpret and explain the relations between cultural phenomena, particularly religious and political, by situating them in precise social and historical contexts.

== Commitments ==
Löwy is linked to the Revolutionary Marxist current in France, and one of his last books, on Che Guevara, was written in collaboration with Olivier Besancenot, presidential candidate of the Revolutionary Communist League, a Trotskyist party linked to the Fourth International. He is a member of the association ATTAC, of the Copernicus Foundation and of Espaces Marx. He has kept intense political contacts in Brazil.

Löwy cooperated with left currents of the Brazilian Workers' Party (PT) for several years but during recent years his main contact has been with the Brazilian Landless Workers Movement (MST), to whom he gave the money of the Prize Sergio Buarque de Hollanda which he received in 2000 for his book The war of Gods. Nowadays, Löwy supports Socialism and Liberty Party (PSOL), a left dissidence of PT.

Löwy has taken part in the World Social Forum since the beginning, where he has presented several papers, one of which was in collaboration with the Brazilian liberation theologian Frei Betto. More recently, Löwy joined the struggle for ecosocialism; co-author, with Joel Kovel, of the International Ecosocialist Manifesto, he was also one of the organizers of the First Ecosocialist International Meeting in Paris (2007).

Interested since his youth by Surrealism, he met the poet Benjamin Péret during a visit in Paris in 1958, Löwy joined the Paris Surrealist Group, by invitation of Vincent Bounoure, its main organizer since 1969. Two of his books are devoted to Surrealism, in its utopian and revolutionary dimension.

== Publications ==
- The Marxism of Che Guevara, New York, Monthly Review Press, 1973. (Second Edition : Rowman and Littlefield, 2007.
- "Marxism and Revolutionary Romanticism". Telos 49 (Fall 1981). New York: Telos Press.
- Georg Lukács: from Romanticism to Bolchevism, London, Verso, 1981.
- The politics of combined and uneven development. The theory of permanent revolution, London, Verso Books, 1981.
- Redemption and Utopia. Libertarian Judaism in Central Europe, Stanford University Press, 1992.
- Marxism in Latin America from 1909 to the Present, New Jersey, Humanities Press, 1992.
- On Changing the World. Essays in political philosophy: from Karl Marx to Walter Benjamin, New Jersey, Humanities Press, 1993. (Also in Japanese and Persian).
- The war of gods. Religion and Politics in Latin America, London, Verso, 1996.
- Fatherland or Mother Earth? Essays on the national question, London, Pluto Press, 1998.
- Morning Star. Surrealism, Marxism, Anarchism, Situationism, Utopia, Austin, University of Texas Press, 2000 (Expanded edition 2009).
- Romanticism against the Tide of Modernity (with Robert Sayre), Durham, Duke University Press, 2001.
- Joel Kovel and Michael Löwy (2002), "Manifeste écosocialiste international".
- Franz Kafka, rêveur insoumis, Paris, Editions Stock, 2004.
- Fire Alarm. Reading Walter Benjamin’s ‘On the Concept of History', London, Verso, 2005.
- The Theory of Revolution in the Young Marx, Leiden/Boston, Brill, 2003.
- Che Guevara, une braise qui brûle encore, with Olivier Besancenot, Paris, Mille et une nuits, 2007.
- Revolutions, Haymarket Books, 2015.
- Michael Löwy, "Why Ecosocialism: For a Red-Green Future", Great Transition Initiative (December 2018).
- Romantic Anti-capitalism and Nature. The Enchanted Garden, with Robert Sayre, New York, Taylor & Francis, 2020.
- Revolutionary Affinities: Toward a Marxist Anarchist Solidarity, with Olivier Besancenot, PM Press, 2023.

== Sources ==
- Richard Wolin, "A Metaphysical Materialist", The Nation, October 16, 2006, p. 30-35.
