= Sean McMeekin =

American historian (born 1974)

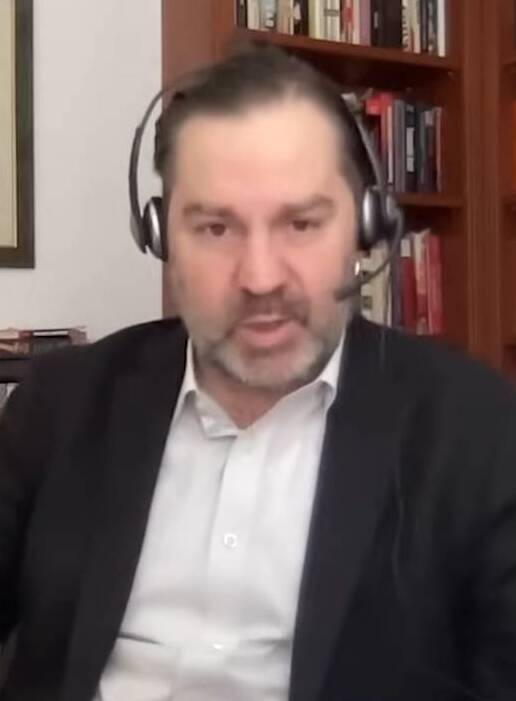
- McMeekin in 2025
- Born: Sean McMeekin; May 10, 1974 (age 52); Nampa, Idaho, US
- Education: Stanford University
- Occupation: Historian
- Spouse: Nesrin Ersoy McMeekin

Sean McMeekin (born May 10, 1974) is an American historian. His work focuses on European history of the early 20th century, and his main research interests include modern German history, Russian history, communism, and the origins of the First and Second World Wars and the roles of the Russian and Ottoman empires.

He has written eight books, along with scholarly articles which have appeared in journals such as Contemporary European History, Common Knowledge, Current History, Historically Speaking, The World Today, and Communisme. He is currently Francis Flournoy Professor of European History and Culture at Bard College.

== Early life and education ==
Sean McMeekin was born on May 10, 1974, in Nampa, Idaho, and grew up in Rochester, New York. He studied history at Stanford University (B.A. 1996) and the University of California, Berkeley (M.A. 1998 and PhD 2001).

== Career ==
McMeekin taught in Turkey as an assistant professor in the Centre for Russian Studies at Bilkent University in Ankara, then in the College of Social Sciences and Humanities of Koç University in Istanbul. He is now Francis Flournoy Professor of European History and Culture at Bard College in New York State.

== Reception of published works ==
McMeekin's 2011 book The Russian Origins of the First World War was initially praised by the popular press as an insightful revisionist study for its use of Tsarist documents. It was criticized by historians for its core theses, which advance a view of Russian involvement beyond what others have concluded. Because McMeekin was the first historian to publish questionable documents from the Tsarist archives suggesting Russian support for Armenian groups inside the Ottoman empire during the war, his treatment of the Armenian genocide has also been criticized, with one scholar pointing out that "The mass slaughter of Armenian civilians was in no way justified by the haphazard Russian support for Armenian paramilitary groups in Eastern Anatolia." The Economist review noted, "if McMeekin's purpose was merely to exonerate all Ottoman behavior and play down Armenian suffering, he would not have included the observation of a Venezuelan soldier of fortune who saw on a mountainside 'thousands of half-nude and bleeding Armenian corpses, piled in heaps or interlaced in death's final embrace.'"

McMeekin's 2013 book, July 1914: Countdown to War and his 2015 study, The Ottoman Endgame: War, Revolution, and the Making of the Modern Middle East were both well-received by the popular press.

His 2021 book, Stalin’s War, received positive reviews from National Review, The Times, and The Financial Times. The historian Serhii Plokhy called it "...a revisionist take on the second world war". It also received positive reviews from the historians Simon Sebag Montefiore, Geoffrey Wawro, and Sir Antony Beevor, who called it "...both original and refreshing, written as it is with a wonderful clarity." It was reviewed negatively by Lawrence Freedman in Foreign Affairs and others for being revisionist and even "distorted". Similarly, the historian Mark Edele argued that the book misquotes Joseph Stalin's speeches, and included sources refuted decades beforehand, or long ago shown to be fraudulent. Edele concluded:

"A gifted writer and a talented polemicist, he has lowered the historian’s craft to the level of propaganda. The result is a lamentable step back in our understanding of Stalin and his second world war."

Nina Khrushcheva, a professor of international affairs and a great-granddaughter of the Soviet leader Nikita Khruschchev, observed that "weighing in at some 800 pages, Stalin’s War compiles an impressive amount of historical information. But, given McMeekin’s procrustean framework, it comes across as cluelessly arrogant."

== Prizes ==
- 2010: Barbara Jelavich Book Prize for The Berlin-Baghdad Express
- 2011: Norman B. Tomlinson Jr. Book Prize for The Russian Origins of the First World War
- 2015: Arthur Goodzeit Book Award for The Ottoman Endgame
- 2016: Historian's Prize of the Erich-und-Erna-Kronauer-Stiftung

== Selected works ==
- — (2003). The Red Millionaire: A Political Biography of Willy Münzenberg, Moscow's Secret Propaganda Tsar in the West. New Haven: Yale University Press. ISBN 978-0-300-09847-1.
- — (2008). History's Greatest Heist: The Looting of Russia by the Bolsheviks. New Haven: Yale University Press. ISBN 978-0-300-13558-9.
- — (2010). The Berlin-Baghdad Express: The Ottoman Empire and Germany's Bid for World Power. Cambridge: Belknap Press. ISBN 978-0-674-05739-5.
- — (2013). The Russian Origins of the First World War. Cambridge: Belknap Press. ISBN 978-0-674-07233-6.
- — (2013). July 1914: Countdown to War. London: Icon Books. ISBN 978-1-84831-593-8.
- — (2015). The Ottoman Endgame: War, Revolution, and the Making of the Modern Middle East, 1908–1923. London: Penguin Press. ISBN 978-1-59420-532-3.
- — (2017). The Russian Revolution: A New History. New York: Basic Books. ISBN 978-0-465-03990-6.
- — (2021). Stalin's War: A New History of World War II. New York: Basic Books. ISBN 978-1-5416-7279-6.
- — (2024). To Overthrow the World: The Rise and Fall and Rise of Communism. New York: Basic Books. ISBN 978-1-5416-0196-3.
