= Stéphane Courtois =

French historian (born 1947)

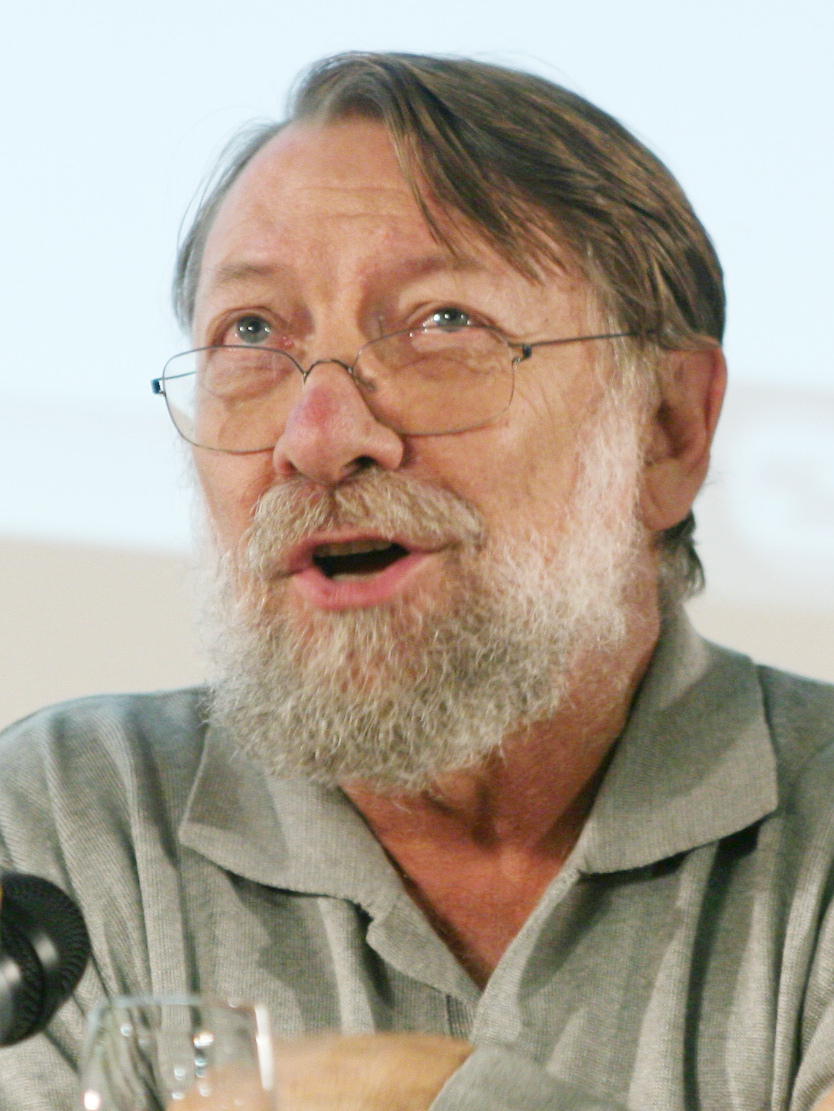
- Courtois in 2009
- Born: 25 November 1947 (age 78); Dreux, Eure-et-Loir, France
- Education: Paris Nanterre University
- Occupations: Director of Research at CNRS; Professor of History at ICES
- Employer(s): Paris Nanterre University; French National Centre for Scientific Research; Catholic Institute of Higher Studies
- Known for: Research on communism and communist genocides

Notes
- Director of the journal Communisme, member of the Scientific Council of the Foundation for Political Innovation (2009–2011)

Stéphane Courtois (French: [stefan kuʁtwa]; born 25 November 1947) is a French historian and university professor, a director of research at the French National Centre for Scientific Research (CNRS), professor at the Catholic Institute of Higher Studies (ICES) in La Roche-sur-Yon, and director of a collection specialized in the history of communist movements and communist states.

The Black Book of Communism, a 1997 book edited by Courtois, has been translated into numerous languages, sold millions of copies, and is considered one of the most influential and controversial books written about the history of communism in the 20th century and state socialist regimes. In the first chapter of the book, Courtois argued that Communism and Nazism are similar totalitarian systems and that Communism was responsible for the murder of around 100 million people in the 20th century. Courtois' attempt to equate the two has been polemically effective, but controversial due to his numbers and his choice of which countries and events to compare, as well as being revisionist.

Courtois is a research director at the French National Centre for Scientific Research, in the Géode (group of study and observation of democracy) at Paris West University Nanterre La Défense. He is also a professor at the Catholic Institute of Higher Studies – ICES. He is editor of the journal Communisme, which he cofounded with Annie Kriegel in 1982, and part of the Cercle de l'Oratoire think tank.

As a student, from 1968 to 1971, Courtois was a Maoist, but he later became a strong supporter of democracy, pluralism, and the rule of law.

== Maoist activism (1968–1971) ==
Courtois was an activist in the Maoist Marxist–Leninist organization Vive communism from 1968 to 1971, which changed its name in 1969 to Vive la Revolution with Roland Castro. At this time he directed the organisation's bookstore at rue Geoffroy-Saint-Hilaire in Paris. He describes himself as having been "anarcho-Maoist," but many "repented" of the extreme left and later became supporters of democracy and multi-party democracy and often anti-communists.

=== Communist Party at war and Communisme journal ===
Having taken legal studies and history, he became known in 1980 with the publication of his thesis, the PCF at war under the direction of Annie Kriegel. It was with her that he founded in 1982 the journal Communisme to bring together anticommunist specialists on French communism. After the death of Kriegel, he became the main organiser of the magazine. He was appointed director of research at the French National Centre for Scientific Research (CNRS), where he was responsible for the "Group observations and studies of democracy" (GEODE). That period at Communisme was seen as an extremely rich period for research of all kinds, the crucible of important work published in the 1980s.

Courtois served as the historical consultant on the controversial 1985 documentary Des terroristes à la retraite, which alleged a conspiracy by the PCF leadership to betray the FTP-MOI resistance group to the French police in 1943. The film accused Boris Holban of betraying Missak Manouchian to the Brigades spéciales. In his interview in the film, Courtois stated: "From summer 1943 on, the Communist Party clearly sought to affirm its superiority within the resistance. To that end, and to reinforce its prestige, it had to have bombings and other armed attacks to publicize. In Paris there was only one group available to carry out such attacks: the foreign combatants. The party leadership had the option of keeping them safe or keeping them in the fight. That was what happened, and we can safely say that they were sacrificed to serve the higher interests of the party". The documentary set off an intense debate in France known as L’Affaire Manouchian. During the affaire, Courtois reversed his position. In the 1989 book Le sang de l'étranger − les immigrés de la MOI dans la Résistance co-written with Adam Rayski and Denis Peschanski, Courtois cleared Holban of the allegation that he was a police informer and concluded that it was "brutally efficient police work" by the Brigades spéciales that led to the mass arrests of the FTP-MOI members in November 1943. ''Le sang de l'étranger had a major impact on the historiography of the French resistance as the book established the majority of the attacks on German forces in the Paris area between April 1942-August 1944 were the work of the FTP-MOI, which had ignored by historians until then in order the make the Resistance appear more French.

=== Visits to archives of the Comintern in Moscow (1992–1994) ===
Following the fall of the Berlin Wall in 1989 and of the "Iron Curtain", the Soviet Union broke up in December 1991, the archives of the Comintern were opened not only to Russian historians but also to western researchers.

The opening represented an opportunity for him to access unpublished sources to rewrite the history of the Comintern and of the Communist parties afflicted to it. Until that time, what was known of the Comintern was only what the Soviet leadership wished to be known, countered only by unverifiable assertions of their opponents. Courtois described the historiographical turning point as a "true revolution in documentation".

For example, a historical study of the PCF had been made for decades not on genuine archival documents but on the basis of stories, such as memoirs published by PCF members, including Jacques Duclos, because the original PCF records were kept not at party headquarters in Paris, but in Moscow, in accordance with the central clauses governing their admission to the Comintern (conditions of admission to the Third International).

In 2006, Courtois wrote a book entitled Communism in France: The revolution in documentation and revised historiography.

He made his first visit to the archives of the Comintern in Moscow in September 1992. Later he made three more visits, the last in December 1994. In 2009, at a conference, Stéphane Courtois said: "I did not go to promote The Black Book of Communism in Russia.... In any case, I do not go back again for quite some time.... I quickly became aware that I was under constant surveillance in the archives".

Courtois gleaned some spectacular information from the archives and in deliberately provoking controversy, which led in the eyes of some at the Communisme journal to a divisive position with the complementary scientific researches there. Since 1993, a large part of the editorial board of Communisme left the journal.

=== Orientation of works after publication of The Black Book ===
If the historiographic production of Courtois before 1995 mainly concerned the PCF, afterward, it focused more on the Comintern and the history of communist regimes in Eastern Europe. In the Black Book, he was concerned with the criminal aspects of the actions of the Comintern. In his book on Eugen Fried, which he cowrote with Annie Kriegel in 1997, the emphasis was more on the control by the Comintern on the national communist parties and the mass anti-fascist organizations such as Amsterdam-Pleyel, Secours Rouge, and the Universal Gathering for peace. In the foreword of Eugen Fried, he indicated that the project initiated in 1984–1985 had to be suspended in 1991 when the archives of the Communist Party of the Soviet Union were transferred to the State Archives of the Republic of Russia. "In 1992, Annie Kriegel and Stéphane Courtois were there in Moscow. They made several trips to the Russian capital and brought back thousands of pages on microfilm...."

In a communication to the Academy of Moral and Political Sciences, Courtois defended the thesis that Stalin was perfectly representative of the Soviet regime introduced in the 1917 Revolution led by Lenin, stating: "The fact remains that in the foundation phase of the system, from 1917 to 1953, it was the ideology that dictated the conduct of Lenin and then of Stalin.... Stalin was an authentic Bolshevik — pupil of the school of Leninism.... Stalin was not the obscure apparatchik described by Trotsky, but one of the direct collaborators of Lenin and among the most appreciated for his unwavering support of the leader, his sense of discipline, his composure and exceptional firmness of character, his determination, and his total lack of scruples or compassion in his actions".

After the publication of Eugen Fried, Courtois led many joint editorial projects, such as A clean sweep From the past! History and Memory of Communism in Europe (2002), which came at the end of the Black Book of Communism and provided additions to the book, mostly written by foreign authors, and the Dictionary of Communism (2007). In 2008, he contributed to the Black Book of the French Revolution, in a chapter devoted to the relationship between Jacobinism and Bolshevism.

In 2009, he returned again to the question of communism with the book Communism and totalitarianism, which was a collection of a series of his articles on the subject.

He has also expanded his work to include all totalitarian regimes. He organises many international conferences on this theme and maintains a collection of the Éditions du Seuil and the Éditions du Rocher.

== Major works ==
=== Methodological influences ===
A student of Kriegel, Courtois said that his book Communism and Totalitarianism (2009) is built on the model of several books by her, including The Bread and the Roses: foundations for a history of socialism (1968) and French communism in the mirror (1974). The methodology, developed by her and adopted by him, consisted of an accumulation of stages of thought of the researcher in the form of texts that are grouped by topic and published regularly.

Taking up the concept of a "history workshop "developed by the historian François Furet, in his eponymous book published in 1982, Stéphane Courtois said that "the serious historian is an artisan who constantly works on the job, because he is dependent on sources, archives, etc.... And of course, these sources, archives, they are constantly changing. Thus, the evolution of this process permits a construction of a united vision more comprehensive and nuanced than at the start.

=== The Black Book of Communism (1997) ===
After many contributions and publications on various aspects of communism, both in France and internationally, Courtois participated in the Black Book of Communism, a project published in November 1997, where he was the coordinator and wrote the preface. Also participating in this work were Nicolas Werth (professor of history and a researcher at the Institute of Modern History (IHTP) where he specialises in the Soviet Union), Jean-Louis Panné (historian and editor at Gallimard, also the author of a biography of Boris Souvarine), Karel Bartosek (researcher at CNRS and editor of the journal New Alternative), Andrzej Paczkowski (Professor of Political Science and member of the board of the archives for the Ministry of Interior). Courtois himself was the co-author of an article on the Comintern.

=== Content ===
The book takes stock of the crimes committed by the various forms of power exercised by communism. The introduction by Courtois is entitled "The Crimes of Communism", which was responsible for the deaths of nearly 100 million human beings.

"The crimes of communism have not been subject to a legitimate and normal assessment from a historical or a moral point of view. Without doubt this is here one of the first times that we try an approach to communism in questioning whether its criminality is both central and global to its existence".

The book is part of an essentialist vision of communism developed by Ernst Nolte that it would have as its essence a general criminal nature.

=== Controversy over number of victims ===
One of the contributors to the Black Book, Nicolas Werth criticised Courtois for having, in his preface, the figure of 20 million economic or political victims of socialism in the USSR while they did not number more than 15 million victims. Another contributor, Jean-Louis Margolin noted that he had never talked about 1 million deaths in Vietnam contrary to what was claimed by Courtois in his text.

How to calculate in an unbiased fashion the numbers of disparate victims who died in civil wars, economic crises or even common criminals on five continents by various regimes for more than 70 years, was also discussed. The authors of the Century of Communism (2000), led by Claude Pennetier, challenged the uniqueness of communism underpinned by the Black Book "If it is a presupposition that this book would definitely wish to call in question, as well as prejudice, it contains some truth. It is the uniqueness of what is called the "communism of the 20th century. From "Past of an Illusion, "Crimes of Communism, the first error is the non-critical use of a single article and will consequently reduce Communism to "one" fundamental property. "The authors of this book did not have much in common with the Hungary of János Kádár and the Cambodia of Pol Pot.

=== Controversy on comparison with Nazism ===
It is less the number of deaths caused by dictatorships who claim to be communist as the comparison with Nazism that has caused controversy in France, which has very similar terms to the famous Historikerstreit which tied up Germany in the mid-1980s because of an article by Ernst Nolte. Some writers and commentators were surprised that Courtois made the comparison with Nazism a theme of part of the preface, when no contributions referred to the question.

Courtois raised the comparison between Nazism and Communism as an issue to be dealt with by historians and called for the establishment of an equivalent of the Nuremberg tribunal to try those Communists responsible. He compared the organisation of the two movements, and the number of victims attributed to communism to the number of deaths from Nazism. He draws a parallel between Nazi "race genocide" and what he calls, following Ernst Nolte, "class genocide". For its supporters, Communism was a humanist and egalitarian ideology unlike Nazism and many historians, starting with some authors of the book, expressed their disagreement with Courtois. In particular, Nicolas Werth said that "the more you compare communism and Nazism, the more obvious are the differences".

According to Annette Wieviorka, director of research at CNRS, "Stéphane Courtois shows the comparison between the acute awareness of the Jewish genocide and that of Communism which is a tissue of falsehoods and approximations", highlightened that the Holocaust was not to become a privileged object of historical research until the 1970s and imposed itself on the collective memory only in the 1980s. He also cites François Furet, who would have written the foreword had he not died prematurely, who said that the Genocide of Jews had "the awful distinction of being an end in itself".

Despite repeated denials of a conflict of interest, some saw this comparison as assimilation pure and simple and as such have seen fit to denounce it. The journalist Benoît Rayski accused some intellectuals, including Stéphane Courtois, Alain Besançon, Ernst Nolte and Jean-François Revel, of wanting to confound the West about the issue of Nazism to promote their own anticommunism.

== Main theses ==
=== Historiographical influences ===
Courtois's works, especially The Black Book of Communism, were a continuation of the "turn" in historiography begun in 1995 with the publication of the essay by the excommunist activist historian and member of the Communist Party from 1947 to 1959, François Furet dealing with the "communist illusion" and entitled The Past of an Illusion. Essay on the Communist idea in the 20th century.

Furet had also agreed to write the preface to The Black Book of Communism but he died in July 1997.

=== "Communism is a form of totalitarianism" ===
For Courtois, communism is a form of totalitarianism, and the same for Italian fascism and German Nazism. In that sense, he opposed Hannah Arendt and George L. Mosse. The first matches the birth of totalitarianism in Russia with the rise of Stalin (not Lenin); from there, it reduced to communist totalitarianism in a very short time to "Stalinism". Historiography based on this theory from Hannah Arendt, designed in the 1950s, is, according to Courtois, the mainstream in the teaching of the totalitarian phenomenon in France in the 21st century but Courtois says "campaign" against the historiographic orientation in which he opposes the idea of a totalitarian communism whose beginnings are the publication of What to do? by Lenin in 1902.

This thesis is outlined in his publication Communism and totalitarianism (Perrin, 2009) which dealt with the subject chronologically (thematic in the last installment) in a four-part series of discussions dedicated to the totalitarian regimes in Europe:

- When night falls: Origins and emergence of totalitarian regimes in Europe (1900–1934) (L'Age d'Homme, 2001)
- Such a long night: The peak of the totalitarian regimes in Europe (1935–1953) (Editions du Rocher, 2003)
- The day rises: Legacy of totalitarianism in Europe (1953-2005) (Editions du Rocher, 2003)
- The totalitarian logic in Europe (Editions du Rocher, 2006).

=== "Lenin was the inventor of totalitarianism" ===
Courtois mainly described this thesis in his biography: Lenin, the inventor of totalitarianism (Perrin, 2007). It is included in a chapter on Communism and totalitarianism (Perrin, 2009).

=== "Glorious memory" and "tragic memory" of communism in Europe ===
According to Courtois, there is a clear dichotomy in the history of communism between a "positive memory" of communism in Western Europe (France, Italy, Spain, etc..) and a "tragic memory" in Eastern Europe (Poland, Romania, the Baltic States, etc.). This theory was developed in the book that followed the Black Book of Communism and is entitled Make a clean sweep of the past! History and Memories of Communism in Europe (2002).

In France, the "positive memory" would be echoed in the social conquests of the Popular Front, the participation of the communists in the International Brigades during the Spanish Civil War, the resistance to the German occupation during World War II, and the Soviet victory over Nazism, which Courtois called "the universal appeal of Stalingrad" (the Soviet victory at Stalingrad marked the "turning point of the war" in favour of the Allies). He took here the concept coined by Furet, the "universal appeal of October" in reference to the acclaim around the October Revolution.

To oppose this was a "tragic memory", which, in Poland, comes from its annexation after the Nazi-Soviet pact and the Katyn massacre, in the Baltic countries, from annexations by the Soviet Union from 1944 to 1990, and in Romania, from annexation by the Soviet Union of the regions of Bessarabia and Northern Bukovina and the establishment of a long dictatorship (45 years). According to the 1991 Commission of Historians' Report on Romania, nearly two million people were killed and nearly 300,000 people were deported to labour camps either within Romania itself, or to Siberia or Kazakhstan. This deep trauma resulted in Romania, by the creation in 1993 at Sighet, a prison used by the Romanian communist regime, a place of memory (research institute, library, museum and summer university) unique of its kind: the "Memorial to the Victims of Communism and of the Resistance" (Memorial to the Victims of Communism and of the Resistance) (Memorialul Victimelor Comunismului şi al Rezistenţei). Conference proceedings and discussions supported by Stéphane Courtois during four visits made to the memorial, and the Centre for Studies of Bucharest, were published in November 2003 under the title Courtois The Sighet(Fundatia Academia Civica) and republished in 2006 (Liternet).

In his speech at the Summer University at Sighet entitled "The Lost Honour of the European Left," Courtois denounced the rejection by more than two-thirds of the Parliamentary Assembly of the Council of Europe of a Resolution and a "Recommendation concerning the condemnation of crimes committed by totalitarian communist regimes", 25 January 2007.

According to Courtois, the rejection was representative of the phenomenon that Alain Besançon described in 1997 as "historical amnesia and hypermnesia" (amnesia for non-Nazi crimes, hypermnesia for Nazi crimes) resulting in a denial of the "memory of the victims of other regimes other than Nazi" in some Western European states. It also prevents the emergence of what he calls a "reunification memorial", which could exist, with commemorations and educational activities taking place in common.

== Public pronouncements ==
=== Support for military intervention in Afghanistan and Iraq ===
He is a member of the Circle of Oratory and is on the editorial board of the journal Brave New World. It is a source of public support for the Afghan war of 2001, against "Islamic fundamentalism".

In the book Iraq, and me. Another look at a world at war, Stéphane Courtois drew a parallel between the communist past and the Islamism of today. Intellectually pro-American, he believes in his famous speech to the UN, Dominique de Villepin was a victim of reactions from Soviet propaganda in France. Having overemphasised "U.S. go home" for fifty years, it leaves its traces. Following the war in Iraq, he found that the abuses committed by American soldiers in Abu Ghraib prison was an "inevitable sideline of war".

=== Support for Gerard Chauvy ===
Stéphane Courtois supported the author Gerard Chauvy in the trial that determined part of a biography of the French Resistance leaders Raymond and Lucie Aubrac was public defamation. François Delpla believed that in the context of this case, "the desire to finish with communism" had been lost on Courtois to the extent that he was running with the wolves against Aubrac, during a campaign questioning the quality of the resistance.

== Controversies with French historians ==
In France, Courtois has been a historian challenged by a number of his colleagues.

=== Henry Rousso ===
The historian Henry Rousso (Vichy, a past that does not pass, 1996) criticized him for simplifying all militant or communist sympathizers as accomplices of the crimes of Stalinism and, by extension, considered all to be conditionally allied with communist forces or with the Soviets as blind accomplices of Stalin.

=== Jean-Jacques Becker ===
The historian Jean-Jacques Becker believed that his research was sensationalist in nature: "This is a fighter who wants to make history effective, that is to say exactly the opposite of history…."

=== Annie Lacroix-Riz et Jean-Jacques Marie ===
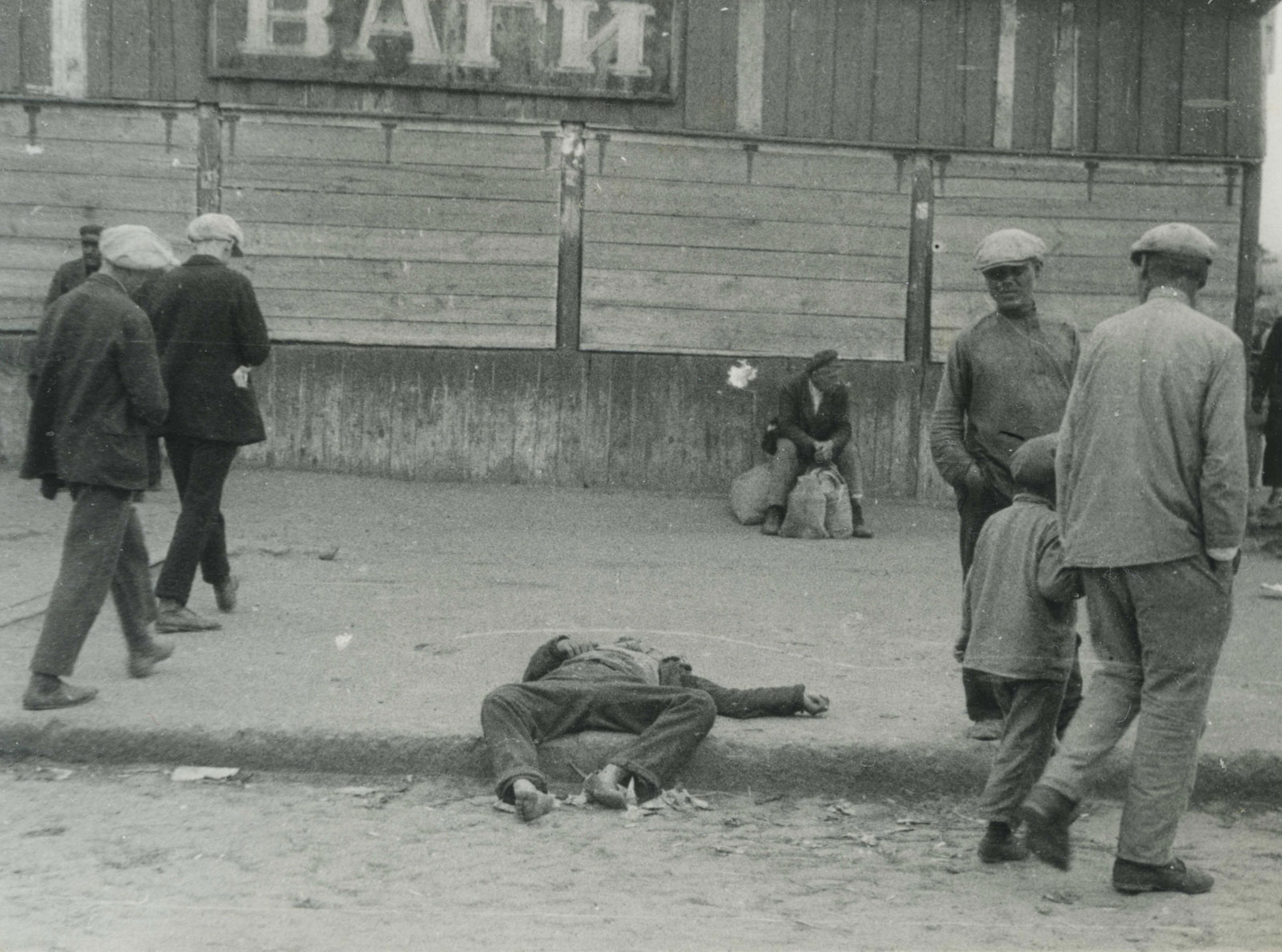
Passers-by ignore the body of a starved man on a street in Kharkiv in 1932.

In 2006, in the magazine Brave New World, he published an article Famine in Ukraine (Holodomor): you said "denial"? (republished on the website of the historical journal Arkheia) in which he publicly accused the French historian, Annie Lacroix-Riz of denying the Holodomor in Ukraine in 1932–1933.

The famine was reported in the Western world in 1933 by Welsh journalist Gareth Jones and in 1935 by Boris Souvarine, and many years later by Alexander Solzhenitsyn in 1973 in The Gulag Archipelago. However, after a carefully sanitized visit in the summer of 1933 by Prime Minister of France Édouard Herriot, the latter declared there to be no famine. The great famine was confirmed by the opening of Soviet archives in the early 1990s.

According to him, Annie Lacroix-Rice tried to downplay the event as one of "scarcity" a famine in which several million people died. This article was issued in response to the creation by Annie Lacroix-Riz, of "a website to appeal to his colleagues to mobilize against an unspeakable lie that ran the world for seventy years: No, ladies and gentlemen, there was no famine in Ukraine in 1932–1933, much less a famine that would have caused millions of deaths, and especially not a famine organized by the Soviet regime itself".

Subsequently, in 2007 and in 2008 respectively, Marxist historians Annie Lacroix-Riz and Jean-Jacques Marie criticized Stéphane Courtois for having expressed his views in an interview with the extreme right monthly Le Choc du mois.

In 2009, he criticized the Trotskyist historian Jean-Jacques Marie for the contents of chapter entitled: "1922: the year of serenity", published in his biography Lenin, 1870–1924 (Balland, Paris, 2004). Courtois accuses Jean-Jacques Marie for apologising for Lenin for whom 1922, on the contrary, was "the year of transition to paranoia". This showed itself on the one hand, by the note from Lenin to the Politburo on 19 March 1922 in which he wanted to use the Soviet famine of 1921–1922 to destroy the Russian Orthodox Church: "It is precisely now when the famine-struck regions eat human flesh, and thousands of corpses litter the roads, that we need to enforce the confiscation of church property with savage energy and most unforgivingly, and crush any hint of resistance, with such brutality that it will be talked about for decades". This "paranoia" is also reflected in the Terror against the Socialist-Revolutionaries (death sentences, gulag, etc..) as well as the expulsion (or sometimes internal exile) of the Russian intelligentsia. This last event is described by him in the chapter, "Lenin and the destruction of the Russian intelligentsia", in his book Communism and totalitarianism (pre-published in Societal magazine No. 55 to 59): "the deportees were warned that any illegal return to Russia would automatically entail the death penalty". On 25 May 1922, Lenin addressed himself to Stalin in the following terms: "hundreds of these gentlemen must be expelled without mercy. We are going to clean up Russia once and for all.... They should all be turned away from Russia". In September 1922, Lenin justified his act to Maxim Gorky: "the intellectuals, the lackeys of capitalism, think they are the brains of the nation. In reality, they are not the brain, they are crap".

== Influence abroad ==
Although sometimes contested in France, his works are generally more favourably received abroad, especially in the former communist regimes of Eastern Europe.

=== Romania ===
==== Translation of his work ====
As proof of his ideological influence, an important part of his work has been translated into Romanian (The Black Book of Communism, Such a long night, Dictionary of communism, Communism and Totalitarianism, The blind spot in European history, etc.).

==== Sighet Memorial and Study Centre in Bucharest ====
Since 2001, he has been the rector of the Summer School of the Sighet Memorial. The visits to Romania are the project of the Ministry of Foreign Affairs.

=== Estonia ===
In 2000, Kommunismi must Raamat the Estonian version of the Black Book of Communism received political support by being prefaced by the President of Estonia Lennart Meri. The preface was titled "Shadows over the world" ("Varjud maailma Kohal"). At the same time, the Prime Minister Mart Laar participated in this collective work by signing an additional chapter of 80 pages "Estonia and Communism" ("Eesti ja kommunism").

=== Moldova ===
He was awarded the honorary title of Doctor Honoris Causa by the Free International University of Moldova (ULIM), in Chisinau, on 8 July 2011.

== Specialised publisher ==
Besides his career as a historian, he is a specialised publisher who has published authors such as Ernst Nolte or Reynald Secher.

=== The Age of Man and Communisme (1982–present) ===
Since 1995, he has been Director (co-director from 1982 to 1995) and co-founder, with Annie Kriegel in 1982, of the journal Communisme at the University Press of France and The Age of Man.

=== Threshold: Archives of communism (1995–1999) ===
He was co-founder, with Nicolas Werth in 1995, of the collection "Archives of communism" from editions du Seuil.

=== Rocher: Democracy or totalitarianism (2002–2008) ===
He was the founder and director from 2002 to 2008 of the collection "Democracy or totalitarianism" from Éditions du Rocher. This collection was transferred to Éditions du Cerf in 2010.

=== Deer: Political Deer (2010–present) ===
He has been the founder and director since 2010 of the collection "Political Deer" Éditions du Cerf.

== Published works ==
Most of his works were written in French, but some have been directly published in a foreign language (English, German, etc.), and some have been translated into foreign languages (The Black Book of Communism has more than 30 translations).

=== Individual works / collective works ===
(In collaboration: "in coll."; under his direction: "dir.")

- 1980: The Communist Party at war. De Gaulle, the Resistance, Stalin ... Ramsay, Paris, 585 p. (ISBN 978-2859561345)
- 1987: Communism with Marc Lazar, MA Editions, Paris, 276 p. (ISBN 978-2866762445)
- 1987: Who knew what? The extermination of the Jews 1941–1945 with Adam Rayski (in coll.), La Découverte, Paris, 235 p. (ISBN 978-2707117052)
- 1989: The foreign blood. MOI Immigrants in the Resistance with Adam Rayski and Denis Peschanski (in coll.), Fayard. German Translation The Red Poster Und der Juden in Immigranten französischen resistance, Schwarze Risse Verlag, Berlin, 1994
- 1989: Testament with Boris Holban (in coll.), Paris, Calmann-Lévy, 1989, 324 p.
- 1991: Comrades and Brothers. Communism and Trade Unions in Europe with Marc Lazar and Michael Waller (in coll.), London, Routledge, 204 p. (ISBN 978-0714634210)
- 1991: Fifty years of French passion. De Gaulle and the Communists with Marc Lazar (ed.) (in coll.), Paris, Balland, 1991, 342 p.
- 1992: Rigour & passion. Homage to Annie Kriegel with Shmuel Trigano and Marc Lazar (dir.) (in coll.), Deer/The Age of Man, Paris / Lausanne, 464p. (ISBN 978-2204049474)
- 1995: History of the French Communist Party with Marc Lazar (in coll.), Presses Universitaires de France, Paris, 440 p. (ISBN 978-2130470489 and 978-2130510635) / History of the French Communist Party. 2nd edition updated with Marc Lazar (in coll.), Presses Universitaires de France, Paris, 2000, 480 p. (ISBN 978-2130510635)
- 1995 Notes on a report (about the Pierre Cot affair), Nanterre, GEODE / Université Paris X, 74 p.
- 1997: Eugen Fried, the great secret of the PCF with Annie Kriegel (in coll.), Threshold, Paris (ISBN 978-2020220507)
- 1997: The Black Book of Communism. Crimes, terror, repression with Nicolas Werth, Jean-Louis Panné, Andrzej Paczkowski, Karel Bartosek, and Jean-Louis Margolin (in coll.), Robert Laffont, Paris, 923 p. (ISBN 978-2221082041, 978-2266086110 and 978-2221088616)
- 2001: A look at the crisis of unionism with Dominique Labbé (eds.) (in coll.), L'Harmattan, 222 p. (ISBN 978-2747514620)
- 2001: When night falls. Origins and emergence of totalitarian regimes in Europe, 1900–1934 (ed.), The Age of Man, Lausanne 416 p. (ISBN 978-2825116104)
- 2002: Make a clean sweep of the past! History and Memory of Communism in Europe (ed.), Robert Laffont, (ISBN 978-2221095003)
- 2002: "Ein Gespenst geht um in Europa." Das Erbe kommunistischer Ideologien (dir.) (in coll.) with Uwe Backes, Cologne / Weimar / Vienna Bölhau Verlag, 2002, 454 p. (ISBN 978-3412150013)
- 2003: Such a long night. The climax of the totalitarian regimes in Europe, 1935–1953 (dir.), Editions du Rocher, 532 p. (ISBN 978-2268045825)
- 2003: Courtois at Sighet, Fundatia Civic Academy Collection: Oral History No. 3, Bucharest, 2003, 304 p. (ISBN 973-8214181) / Courtois at Sighet, Editura Liternet, Bucharest, 2006, 185 p. (ISBN 973-7893530)
- 2006: The day rises. The legacy of totalitarianism in Europe, 1953-2005 (dir.), Editions du Rocher, 494 p. (ISBN 978-2268057019)
- 2006: The Totalitarian Logic in Europe (dir.), Editions du Rocher, 615 p. (ISBN 978-2268059785)
- 2006: Communism in France. The documentation revolution and historiographical renewal (dir.), Publishing Cujas, Paris (ISBN 978-2254076048)
- 2007: Dictionary of communism (dir.), Editions Larousse, Paris (ISBN 978-2035837820)
- 2009: Return to the Soviet-Nazi alliance, 70 years on, Foundation for Political Innovation, 16 p. (ISBN 978-2917613368)
- 2009: Communism and totalitarianism, Perrin, Paris (ISBN 978-2262030803)
- 2009: The blind spot of European memory. 23 August 1939: The Soviet-Nazi alliance, Fundatia Civic Academy, Bucharest, 142 p. (ISBN 978-9738214514)
- 2010: French Bolshevism, Fayard, Paris (ISBN 978-2213661377)
- 2011: Exit from communism. The changing of an epoque in Europe (dir.), Paris, Presses Universitaires de France, Paris, 660 p., (ISBN 978-2130587675)
- 2012: Democracy and revolution. A hundred examples from 1789 to now (ed.) (coll.) Jean-Pierre Deschodt, Yolène Dilas-Rocherieux, Deer / University Press of the Catholic Institute of Graduate Studies, (ISBN 978-2204098014)

=== Contributions (preface, afterword, chapter) ===
- 1992: introduction in Youth into the abyss by Liliane Lévy-Osbert, International Studies and Documentation, Paris (ISBN 978-2851391056)
- 2000: preface in European Civil War 1917–1945 by Ernst Nolte, Syrtes Publishing, (ISBN 978-2845450134)
- 2006: interview "The truth about the underground" in The Dossier Kadare. Following the truth about the underground by Shaban Sinani, Ismail Kadare (in coll.), Odile Jacob, Paris, p. 141-205 (ISBN 978-2738117403)
- 2008 edition prepared and presented by Stéphane Courtois, Fascism & Totalitarianism, by Ernst Nolte, Robert Laffont, Mouthpieces collection, Paris, 1022 p.
- 2008: chapter "From the French Revolution to the October Revolution" in The Black Book of the French Revolution Renaud Escande et al., Cerf, Paris, (ISBN 978-2204081603)
- 2008: preface "From Babeuf to Lemkin: Genocide and Modernity" in The War of the Vendee and the system of depopulation by Gracchus Babeuf, Cerf, Paris, (ISBN 978-2204087322)
- 2011: afterword in Milestones by Nicolas Berdyaev, Serge Bulgakov, Simon L. Frank, Mikhail Guershenzon, Alexander Izgoev, Bohdan Kistiakovsky, Pyotr Struve, Cerf, Paris, (ISBN 978-2204092715)
- 2011: chapter "Furet and Nolte: for a history of Europe in the 20th century" in François Furet. French Revolution, World War, Communism by Christophe Maillard and Pierre Statius, Cerf, Paris (ISBN 9782204093279)
- 2011: afterword "Neo-Robespierrist historians and killing the memory of the Vendée" in Vendee: From Genocide to memory-cide by Reynald Secher, Cerf, Paris, (ISBN 978-2204095808)

== See also ==
- Sovietology
- R. J. Rummel
- François Furet
- Annie Kriegel
