= The Berlin-Baghdad Express =

2010 book by Sean McMeekin

- Author: Sean McMeekin
- Publication date: 2010

The Berlin-Baghdad Express: The Ottoman Empire and Germany’s Bid for World Power is a book by Sean McMeekin, first published in 2010. It looks at efforts made by Imperial Germany during the First World War to use its connections with the Muslim world to defeat the British Empire, including directing an Islamic jihad against it.

== Argument ==
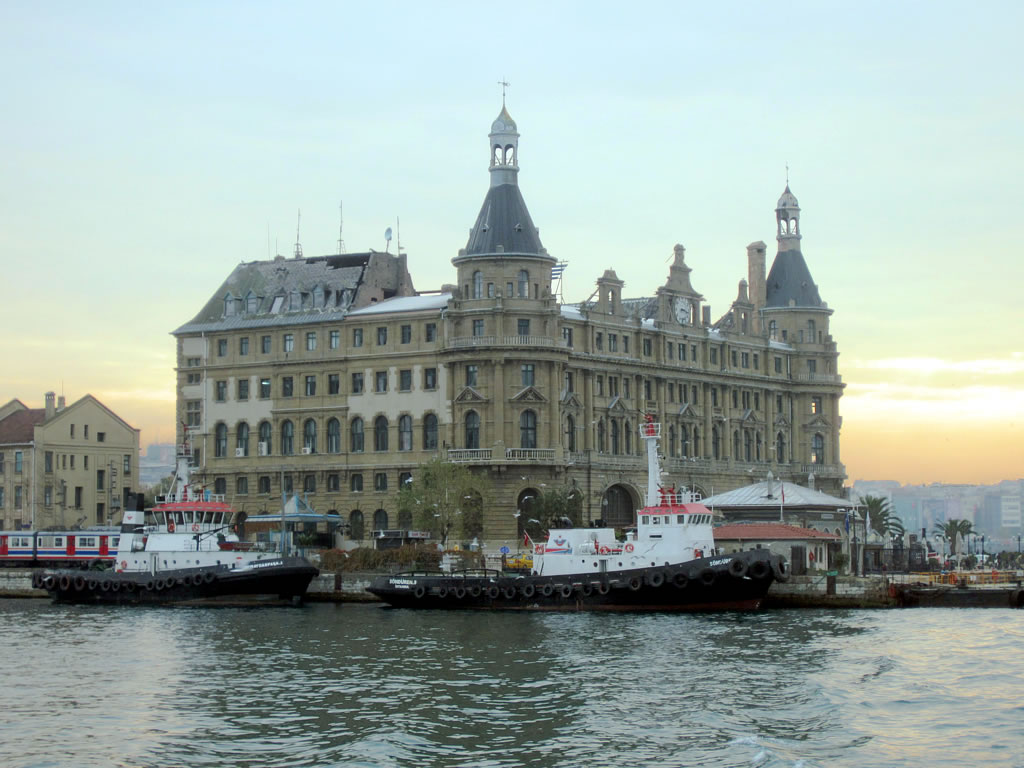
Haydarpasha Istanbul - designed to be a flagship station of the Berlin to Baghdad railway: Kaiser Wilhelm's Weltpolitik taking concrete form (from McMeekin's Prologue)

As the Ottoman Empire lined up with Germany during the First World War a project unfolded to turn the Muslim world against British power: 'from Tripoli to Kabul', the Germans '[spread] jihad, guns and bribes'. France, Russia and Britain ruled over millions of Muslim subjects in their colonial territories. Their resentment over infidel rule might be inflamed in a European war. Imperial latecomer Germany had only a small number of Islamic subjects, by comparison, in her African empire. Afghanistan and Persia were sought as allies for an attack on British India. And desperate attempts were made to finish the Berlin-Baghdad railway. Its construction had begun in 1903 but financial and technical considerations had delayed it - German concerns about the massacre of Armenians in 1915 centered around the delay it caused to further construction.

== Contents ==
Chapters of the book discuss efforts by Max von Oppenheim - the Kaiser's personal envoy - to take charge of the Turko-German holy war, the Baghdad Railway, the Young Turks, the Young Turk Revolution, the declaration of the 'global jihad', the Pursuit of Goeben and Breslau, the activity of Leo Frobenius and Alois Musil, the Raid on the Suez Canal, and the Gallipoli Campaign.

Oppenheim arrived in Constantinople April 1915 - proposing a tour of Asiatic Turkey, setting up jihad propaganda bureaux in Constantinople, Konya, Aleppo, Damascus, Beirut and Jerusalem. Central to his plans for reinvigorating the Ottoman holy war was the still undefined role of Hussein, the Sherif of Mecca. One of Hussein's sons, Faisal - the future king of Syria and Iraq - came to Constantinople to iron out the Hashemite family's differences with the Young Turk regime. He met Oppenheim in Oppenheim's room at the Pera Palace Hotel on 24 April 1915. Oppenheim did not want to discuss relocating the locus of spiritual power with the Sherifs in Mecca; 'the Ottoman Caliphate must remain the unique and central focus towards which the eyes of all Muslims are directed,' he said. According to him it was the duty of all Muslims to fight against English intrigues, to follow the commandments of the Ottoman Caliphate and safeguard the force and prestige of Islam. Faisal didn't share Oppenheim's high regard for the primacy of the Ottoman Caliph.

== Reviews ==
George Walden wrote in The Guardian that "McMeekin has written a powerful, overdue book that for many will open up a whole new side to the First World War".

And Brendan Simms, writing in The Independent, praised the book - "As Sean McMeekin shows in his riveting new book – based on a knowledge not only of the British and German records, but also the Russian-Turkish documents – Berlin's strategy in the Ottoman Empire went well beyond the railroad, which was still winding its way through Anatolia when war broke out in 1914. It formed part of a much broader project of fomenting internal revolution in order to weaken the entente powers, and if possible to knock one or the other out of the war altogether."

Mehmet Yercil, in Times Higher Education, wrote positively about the book but noted that "McMeekin tends to give some credence to the official, apologetic Turkish view that the Armenians, like the Hejaz Arabs a while later, could become a fifth column, especially after the defeat of the Ottoman Third Army against Russia had left the gates of Eastern Anatolia wide open. Indeed, McMeekin states that the Armenians were deported only in Eastern Anatolia." Yercil wondered how that could "account for the fact that, for example, this reviewer's west-central Anatolian home town, Eskişehir, before the war had an Armenian quarter and a Rue Arménienne that no longer exist?" He thought McMeekin's account could have "benefited from a consideration of recent analyses by Hilmar Kaiser and Isabel Hull. On the other hand, his handling of two very complex subjects, namely how the Ottoman Empire entered the war, and what really happened on the Caucasian front after the Bolshevik capitulation in 1917, are the best one will encounter in the historical field."
