= Philip Thody =

English scholar of French literature

- Born: Philip Malcolm Waller Thody; 21 March 1928; Lincoln, England
- Died: 15 June 1999 (aged 71); Leeds, England
- Occupation: Scholar
- Spouse: Joy Woodin (m. 1954)
- Children: 4

Philip Malcolm Waller Thody (21 March 1928 – 15 June 1999) was an English scholar of French literature who was Professor of French Literature at the University of Leeds from 1965 until 1993.

== Early life and education ==
Thody was born in Lincoln in 1928 and educated locally. After national service in the RAF, he read French at King's College London and subsequently lived in Paris for three years, writing a thesis on 'The Vogue of the American Novel in France since 1944', including a year as a lecteur at the Sorbonne.

== Academic career ==
In 1956 Thody was appointed Assistant Lecturer, later Lecturer, at Queen's University Belfast. In 1965 he was appointed Professor of French Literature at the University of Leeds where he remained until his retirement in 1993. He translated and edited work by Albert Camus and Lucien Goldmann, and wrote book-length studies of writers including Camus, Jean-Paul Sartre, Jean Genet, Marcel Proust, Aldous Huxley and Roland Barthes.

Thody launched a "total immersion language course" in French for the Civil Service College in 1972. In 25 years, 700 senior civil servants attended it. Thody was also a member of the civil service final selection panel.

In 1982, he wrote the Thody Report, on improving Diplomatic Service language training.

== Personal life ==
In 1954 he married Joy Woodin. They had two sons and two daughters.

== Death ==
Thody died in Leeds on 15 June 1999, aged 71. He was survived by his wife and children.

== Selected publications ==
- Albert Camus: a study of his work, 1957
- The Fifth French Republic: presidents, politics and personalities, 1960
- Jean-Paul Sartre, 1960
- Sartre: a biographical introduction, 1960
- Jean-Paul Sartre: a literary and political study, 1960
- (ed.) Notebooks, 1935-1942 by Albert Camus, 1963
- (tr.) The hidden God; a study of tragic vision in the Pensées of Pascal and the tragedies of Racine by Lucien Goldmann, 1964
- (ed.) Lyrical and critical essays by Albert Camus, 1967
- Jean Genet: a study of his novels and plays, 1968
- Huxley: a biographical introduction, 1973
- Roland Barthes: a conservative estimate, 1977
- Marcel Proust, 1980
- Le Franglais: forbidden English, forbidden American: law, politics, and language in contemporary France: a study in loan words and national identity, 1995
- Introducing Barthes, 1997
- Introducing Sartre, 1998
