= The Marxism of Che Guevara =

The Marxism of Che Guevara: Philosophy, Economics, and Revolutionary Warfare
- Cover of the first edition
- Author: Michael Löwy
- Original title: La pensée de Che Guevara
- Translator: Brian Pearce
- Language: French
- Subject: Ernesto Guevara
- Published: 1970 (François Maspero, in French); 1973 (Monthly Review Press, in English)
- Publication place: France
- Media type: Print
- Pages: 127 (English translation)
- ISBN: 0-85345-274-1

The Marxism of Che Guevara: Philosophy, Economics, and Revolutionary Warfare (French: La pensée de Che Guevara) is a 1970 book by Michael Löwy. It is a short work addressing the political, ethical and economic components of Ernesto Guevara's thinking.

The English translation by Brian Pearce was published by Monthly Review Press in 1973.

== Response ==
Encyclopædia Britannica described it as "a short but lucid introduction to Guevara's ideas".
