= American Communist History =

- Discipline: History
- Language: English
- Edited by: Denise Lynn

Publication details
- History: 2002–present
- Publisher: Routledge on behalf of the Historians of American Communism
- Frequency: Quarterly

Standard abbreviations
- ISO 4: Am. Communist Hist.

Indexing
- ISSN: 1474-3892 (print); 1474-3906 (web)
- LCCN: 2012222452
- OCLC no.: 52450491

Links
- Journal homepage; Online archive; Online archive

American Communist History is a quarterly peer-reviewed academic journal published by Routledge on behalf of the Historians of American Communism. It covers research on the historical impact of Communism in the United States. The journal was established in 2002 and its founders were primarily founding editor-in-chief Daniel J. Leab (until 2006; also editor of Labor History), and John Earl Haynes. The journal's editorial board is balanced between revisionists and traditionalists and includes some foreign scholars. The current editor is Denise Lynn (University of Southern Indiana).

== Abstracting and indexing ==
The journal is abstracted and indexed in:

- EBSCO databases
- International Bibliography of the Social Sciences
- ProQuest databases
- Scopus

== See also ==
- Communisme
