= Towards a Sociology of the Novel =

- Cover of the 1964 edition
- Author: Lucien Goldmann
- Original title: Pour une sociologie du roman
- Language: French
- Subject: Novel
- Published: 1963
- Publication place: France

Towards a Sociology of the Novel (French: Pour une sociologie du roman) is a 1963 book by Lucien Goldmann. The book was a seminal work for Goldmann. In it, he lays out his theory of the novel.

== Explanation of the text ==
=== Goldmann's thesis ===
“The novel form seems to me, in effect, to be the transposition on the literary plane of everyday life in the individualistic society created by market production. There is a rigorous homology between the literary form of the novel...and the everyday relation between man and commodities in general, and by extension between men and other men, in a market society” (7).

=== Summary ===
==== Influence of Lukács and Girard ====
Goldmann gives us his newest hypothesis on the novel, detailed above in his thesis statement, but he does not explain this idea before giving us a thorough overview of the theory of the novel, as elucidated first by Lukács and then by René Girard.

According to Goldmann, the novel form as identified by both Lukács and Girard follows a certain path: put in the most general terms, it chronicles the rupture between the hero and the world. In this respect, the novel differs from its close cousins, the tragedy and the folk tale. In tragedy, the rupture is entire; in the folk tale, the rupture is either nonexistent or accidental. The novelistic rupture occupies a middle ground between these two extremes. The hero experiences a rupture with his community because his is a quest for authentic values in a degraded world. Since the hero comes from this degraded world, however, he never fully breaks with the community—and is often reconciled with it at the end of the novel.

Goldmann explains that there are three types of novels, which both Lukács and Girard have identified:

1. Abstract realism: the hero has too narrow a vision to understand his complex world.
2. psychological novel: Concerned with the inner life of the hero. The hero is passive and far too ahead of his time to fit into the world.
3. Bildungsroman: This type of novel usually ends with a “self-imposed limitation” as the hero gives up his search for authentic values.

To clarify the differences between Girard and Lukács, Goldmann offers a short summary and analysis of each theorist's insights into the form of the novel. Girard argues that the novel is the story of a degraded search in a degraded world. Moreover, an increase of “ontological sickness” leads to an increase in metaphysical desire in the novel. In other words, the hero, frustrated by his attempt to find concrete values in the world begins to turn toward the metaphysical, the otherworldly for satisfaction.

The hero's quest, according to Girard, is distracted by mediators. These mediators put themselves between the hero and the authentic values for which he searches, thereby turning him away from these authentic values (a bit like Homer's sirens). There are two forms of mediation, external and internal. The external mediating agent is external to the world of the hero. Goldmann's example is the chivalric novels in Don Quixote that distract him from the search for authentic values. The internal mediator is an agent that belongs to the hero's world, such as another character in the novel. Degradation happens because the hero gets closer to the mediating agent, and thereby further away from authentic values and what Goldmann terms “vertical transcendence.”

While Girard and Lukács agreed on many points, they also disagreed on certain key elements of the novel form. Goldmann asserts that this difference lies mainly in their analysis of the novel writer's position in relation to the world created in the novel. Lukács terms this relationship irony, while Girard terms it humor.

Both theorists agree that the novelist must supersede (take the place of) the consciousness of his heroes. They disagree, however, on the nature of this supersession. Girard argues that writing the work helps the writer rediscover authenticity. This is why most “great” works end with the hero's similar conversion. Lukács, on the other hand, has a more pessimistic view of the author's achievements. He argues that the writer cannot supersede so easily because the writer and his imagination are both products of a universally degraded world. Lukács maintains that the writer's irony is also self-reflective, so that the novel actually emphasizes the degraded consciousness of the writer. The fate of the hero is equally unhappy for Lukács: unlike Girard, who believes that the hero's conversion is the discovery of authentic values, Lukács believes that the conversion of the hero is the discovery of the impossibility of authentic values.

The Lukács and Girard converge again, however, when they discuss the place of authentic values in the work. As Goldmann explains, the authentic values are not concretely present in the work; rather, they are only present abstractly in the mind of the writer. The writer cannot concretely place authentic values in the work because novels have no place for abstract ideas — it would be like putting a square peg in a round hole.

The problem becomes, then, taking the abstract/ethical part of the novel, which only exists in the writer's mind, and making it the essential element of a novel which cannot accommodate it. This means, of course, that the novel starts off degraded from the beginning because abstract authenticity cannot be represented in the novel). How is the hero to search for this authenticity?

==== Sociology of the Novel ====
Here Goldmann ends his discussion of the novel form and its perplexities, and moves on to discuss the perplexities of the sociology of the novel. The authenticity question will return after this short summary of the history of the novel in sociology.

As Goldmann explains, the first part of novel writing, from its birth until approximately World War I, the novel was a social chronicle of the time period. If sociologists wanted to understand the time period in which the novel was written, they had only to look at the content of the novel, which provided information of customs, traditions, dress, mannerisms, technology, beliefs, etc. of the time. The belief was, and still is, that the novel reflects the time period in which it was written—it simply cannot help this.

This assumption worked well until World War I. Many novels after this watershed moment simply did not support the belief that a novel's content can give clues about the society in which it was written. These new novels had absurd worlds and an abundance of reification (to treat something abstract as if it were a real thing), and were hardly reliable sources for understanding the society of the time. How to reconcile this new novel with the belief that novels mirror society?

==== The Structure of Modern Society ====
Sidenote: Another related problem that came up was why these novels only appeared after World War I. Marx was explaining reification in the late 19th century, after all, and his commentary related to events that happened even earlier. Why does reification only appear in novels in the 1910s?

Goldmann, of course, provides an answer to this problem (he calls it a hypothesis). Rather than looking at the content of the novel, sociologists need to look at the form of the novel and its relation to the structure of individualistic modern society. Goldmann, in line with the novel-as-mirror-society ideology, says that he doubts the structure of the novel (degraded search for authentic values expressed through mediatization) was invented individually. More likely, it is a reflection of the social life of a group.

This is where Goldmann introduces his thesis: “The novel form seems to me, in effect, to be the transposition on the literary plane of everyday life in the individualistic society created by market production. There is a rigorous homology between the literary form of the novel...and the everyday relation between man and commodities in general, and by extension between men and other men, in a market society” (7). In other words, the novel form is representative of everyday life, specifically of life in an individualistic, market-driven society.

Goldmann then launches into a neo-Marxist comparison between the pre-market and the market society. In the pre-capitalistic society, man judged commodities (clothing, tools, food) by its use value—that is, its value to him as the person who was going to use it. Questions might include, “Is this a good shirt?,” “Is this wild boar edible?,” and so on. In a market society, however, the relationship between the man and the commodity is mediated by money. In this setup, man considers not the commodity's use value, but the mediator's exchange value. Questions might include “What can I get for this money?,” or “How much am I worth in terms of money?” The authentic relationship between man and commodities disappears, and is replaced by these exchange values.

Man → Commodity
Man → Money → Commodity

Goldmann explains that use values have not disappeared entirely; rather, they are like authentic values in the fictional world: they are implied and abstract.

Not all of society gears itself towards exchange values, however. Just as in the novel world a hero breaks with society because of his search for authentic values, so in the real world, some people stay oriented towards use values. These people do not fit in with the rest of society, and so they experience a rupture, much like the hero in the novel. Goldmann clarifies that individuals in society do aim at use values sporadically, but they fail. Considering the structure of the market-driven society in which we function, the novel form is not surprising (as it is representative of the social structure).

==== The Novel and the Structure of Market Society ====
Goldmann here restates and elaborates on his thesis: “Thus the two structures, that of an important fictional genre and that of exchange proved to be strictly homologous, to the point at which one might speak of one and the same structure manifesting itself on two different planes. Furthermore, as we shall see later, the evolution of the fictional form that corresponds to the world of reification can be understood only in so far as it is related to a homologous history of the structure of reification” (8). In other words, we can only understand the evolution of the novel if we understand the structure of reification in the real world.

Here Goldmann takes a short detour to answer a question that must now be plaguing every Marxist and non-Marxist reading the essay. Mainly, “How was the novel form able to emerge from economic reality?” Both Marxists and non-Marxists have previously thought that the novel does not emerge directly out of social life, but out of a collective consciousness that is more abstract and more comprehensive than the particular moment in time in which the novel was written. This is how people thought novels developed:

Social life → Collective consciousness → Literary form

Goldmann noticed, however, that the collective consciousness did not seem to be the necessary intermediary in the new novel because the exchange structure seen in society and the novel form was not existent in the collective consciousness. Moreover, the novel form seems to be not the transposition of something in the collective consciousness, but a search for something missing and implicit in the collective consciousness.

The result is a direct transposition of economic life into literary life (remember the values structures?). While some might consider this development bizarre, Goldmann has a ready answer to explain this development: Marx theorized that in market societies, the collective consciousness ultimately disappears as a separate identity because it becomes a direct reflection of economic life.

So, how do we explain the economic structures->literary manifestations link outside of the collective consciousness? Goldmann blesses us with a four-point hypothesis.

1. Bourgeois society starts to think of money not as a mediator, but as an end point (an absolute value).
2. Some problematic characters remain in this society who do not fit in because they stay focused on the qualitative (use values).
3. The novel form is an expression of discontent and the desire for qualitative values in society as a whole, not just in individuals.
4. The emphasis on the individual in the capitalist market economy led to a development of the individual in novel form.

Goldmann elaborates on this fourth assertion by reminding us that the novel form gives birth not just to an individual, but to a problematic individual. Here's how:

- The experience of the problematic individual in society (see #2 above).
- The contradiction of a bourgeois society that both values the individual and places extreme restrictions on him. The individual eventually disappears from real life and the novel when the economy changes from free competition to monopolies (this happens around 1900-1910).

We thus have two novel periods for the new novel Goldmann is describing (this does not include the happy time when content and not form gave us insight into society). In the transitional period the writer attempts to replace biography with values. In the second, post-Kafka period, the writer gives up on replacing and attempts to write without a subject, thereby eliminating the search for values (we are still in this period says Goldmann in 1963). This disappearance of the subject can also be seen in the theater of absence exemplified by playwrights like Beckett and Adamov, as well as in non-representational art.

The novel form is both critical and oppositional. It is critical of bourgeois society. It is an opposition to a time that could not fathom/did not have the vocabulary for conscious (read: Marxian) resistance to the status quo. Since the novel hero resists this state of affairs, the problematic hero actually is “bound up certainly with history”—but not consciously (13).

Goldmann's argument that the novel reveals the unconscious values of the bourgeoisie, suggests the question, were there works that showed the conscious values and aspirations of the bourgeoisie? Goldmann suggests that one French novelist may have succeeded in a representation of conscious bourgeois values: Balzac. Individualism structured the consciousness of the bourgeoisie in its heyday, and Balzac is the one novelist who really shows the individualism value.

In general, however, the conscious value system played a secondary role in the novels of the time. Goldmann offers no specific answers on this questions, but does offer us a 3-part hypothesis:

1. Valid artistic creation only happens when there is a search for transcendent, trans-individual values. Man is only authentic if he conceives himself part of a community.
2. The bourgeois society is the first ideology in history to deny transcendence; rationalism was its creed. This bourgeois ideology even ignores art in its extreme manifestations.
3. There was a second, “inauthentic” novel form that draws on the collective consciousness. Goldmann suggests that Eugène Sue or Alexandre Dumas, père are examples of this form.
