= Blandine Kriegel =

French philosopher (born 1943)

- Born: 1 December 1943 (age 82); Neuilly-sur-Seine, France
- Occupations: Philosopher; political scientist; professor
- Spouse: Alexandre Adler (died 2023)
- Relatives: Maurice Kriegel-Valrimont (father) Danièle Kriegel (cousin)
- Awards: Commander of the Order of the Legion of Honour (2008)

Education
- Education: University of Lyon
- Doctoral advisor: Bernard Bourgeois

Blandine Kriegel (born 1 December 1943) is a French philosopher, political scientist, and professor. Throughout her career, Kriegel has been president of the Haut Conseil à l'intégration, advisor to Jacques Chirac and member of the Comité consultatif national d'éthique. Kriegel was furthermore assistant to Michel Foucault at the Collège de France.

== Early life and education ==
Kriegel was born in Neuilly-sur-Seine on 1 December 1943. She is the daughter of the resistance fighter, jurist and communist deputy Maurice Kriegel-Valrimont and the resistance fighter Paulette Lesouëf de Brévillier, the niece of the historian and resistance fighter Annie Kriegel and the cousin of the journalist and writer Danièle Kriegel.

In 1967, Kriegel joined the Union des jeunesses communistes marxistes-léninistes. She obtained the agrégation of philosophy in 1968 and became a philosophy teacher at the Amiens high school. She broke with political commitment in 1970.

== Career ==
Kriegel became a research associate at the French National Centre for Scientific Research in 1978.

Kriegel broke with Marxism with the publication of her work L’État et les esclaves ('The state and the slaves') in 1979. She completed her philosophy thesis at the University of Lyon under the direction of Bernard Bourgeois. President François Mitterrand entrusted her with a mission on the modernization of the state in 1984, which would give rise to various publications.

In 1994, Kriegel became a professor at the Paris Nanterre University.

In 2002, Kriegel chaired the mission of evaluation, analysis and proposals relating to violent representations on television, which submitted a report to the Minister of Culture Jean-Jacques Aillagon. His conclusions were not appreciated by "the post-'68 press", in the words of Alain Finkielkraut.

Kriegel was appointed president of the Haut Conseil à l'intégration in October 2002. She also worked to introduce French speakers to the intellectual movement called the Cambridge School. Six years later, in 2008, she was promoted to Commander of the Order of the Legion of Honour.

In 2011, in La République et le prince moderne ('The Republic and the Modern Prince'), Kriegel suggested that the first true "republican" revolution in Europe was that of the Netherlands, through the Plakkaat van Verlatinghe that the northern states drafted to proclaim the fall of King Philip II of Spain. This revolution would have, according to her, anticipated two centuries in advance that of the United States of America in 1776 and of France in 1789.

From 2012 to 2018, she was a member of the Committee for Prefectural History.

== Political commitments ==
After having been close to the Socialist Party, in 1995, Kriegel supported the candidacy of Jacques Chirac in the presidential election. She is furthermore opposed to positive discrimination but a member of the sponsorship committee of the Marianne de la diversité foundation.

== Honours ==
Honours
Ribbon bar	Honour	Country	Date	Source
	Commander of the Order of the Legion of Honour	France	2008	
