= Ernest Labrousse =

French historian

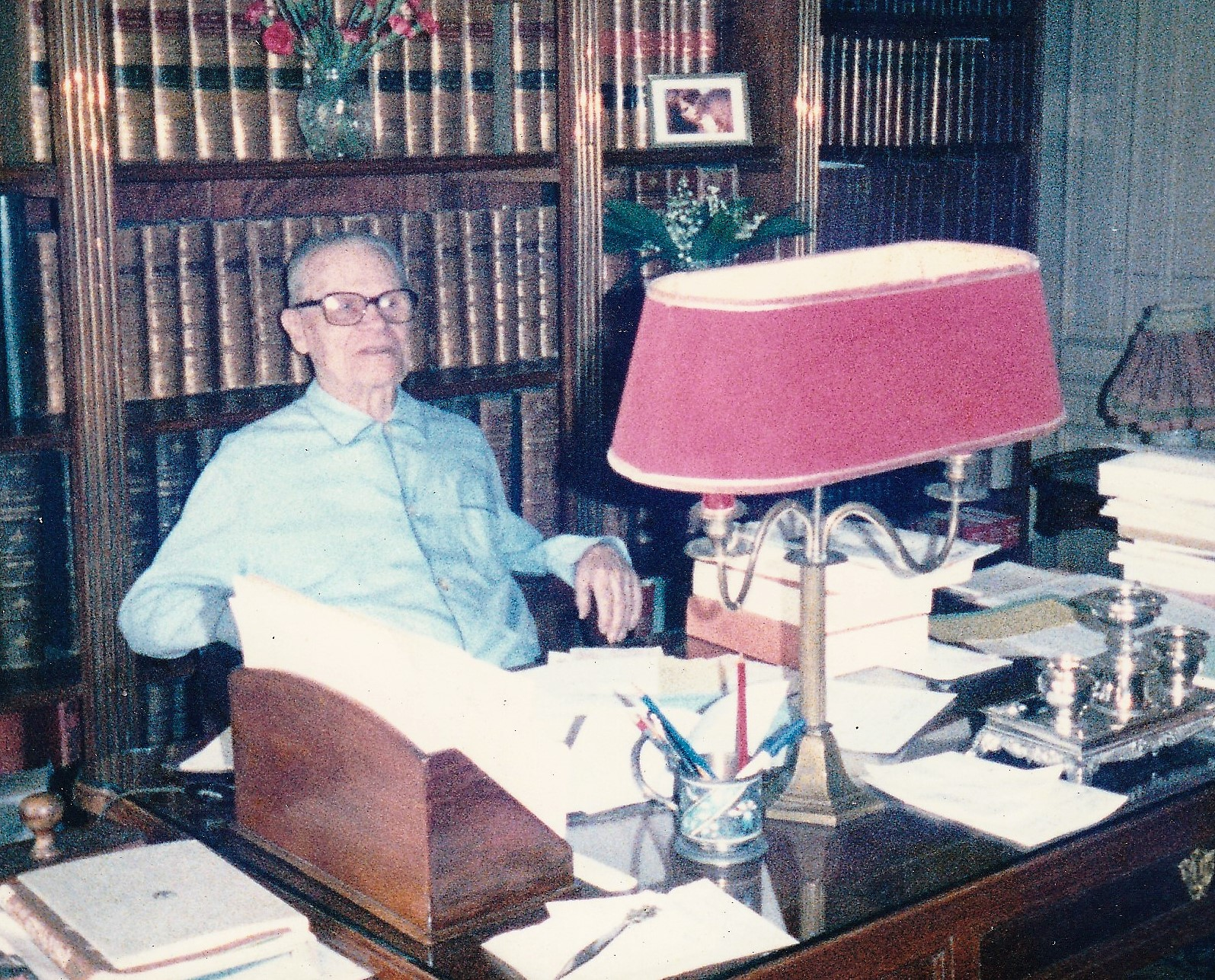
- Portrait of Labrousse at his desk, 1986
- Born: Camille-Ernest Labrousse; 16 March 1895; Barbezieux, Aquitaine, French Third Republic
- Died: 24 May 1988 (aged 93); Paris, French Fifth Republic
- Political party: PSU
- Other political affiliations: SFIO; PCF

Academic background
- Doctoral advisor: Albert Aftalion

Academic work
- Discipline: History
- Sub-discipline: Social and economic history
- Doctoral students: Annie Kriegel; Emmanuel Le Roy Ladurie
- Notable students: Pierre Vidal-Naquet
- Main interests: French history
- Notable ideas: Cliometrics

Camille-Ernest Labrousse (French: [kamij ɛʁnɛst labʁus]; 16 March 1895 – 24 May 1988) was a French historian specializing in social and economic history.

== Biography ==
Labrousse established a historical model centered on three nodes, economic, social and cultural, inventing the quantitative history sometimes now called cliometrics. Eschewing biographies and the narrative accounts of individual witnesses, which have provided the backbone of traditional historiography, he applied statistical methods and influenced a whole generation. Fernand Braudel said that if it were not for Labrousse, "historians would never have set to work as willingly as they did on the study of wages and prices". Labrousse's prominence was also a result of his post at the Sorbonne, where he supervised a generation of French post-doctoral thèses and his organizational skills from the 1950s onward in leading team research efforts that were models of the historian's craft.

His first great work was his Esquisse du mouvement des prix et des revenus en France au XVIIIe siècle ("Sketch of the movement of prices and revenues in France during the 18th century", 1932), the result of his law dissertation under the direction of Albert Aftalion. It synthesizes several data series on prices of food and manufactures, on incomes, including the inflationary rise in land rents, and on lagging wages over the course of the century, as part of the interplay between economic trends and class frictions that led ultimately to revolution.

Labrousse's own work concentrated on 18th and 19th-century France, but his constant concern for working methods that could be expanded beyond his subjects at hand to inspect other parts of the early modern world and the world that was transformed by the Industrial Revolution, is exemplified in the range of studies in the hommage of his pupils and their pupils that was edited by Braudel and others, Conjoncture économique, structures sociales (Paris 1974). The "Labrousse model" of the subsistence crisis in the preindustrial grain-and-textiles economy of France and its effect in precipitating the French Revolution, detailed in the second of his two magisterial works, La Crise de l’économie française (1943), which Fernand Braudel called "the greatest work of history to have appeared in France in the course of the last twenty-five years." has especially wide application, though his paradigm has been adjusted by subsequent studies that have reintroduced complexities.

== Major works ==
- Esquisse du mouvement des prix et des revenus en France au XVIIIe siècle, 2 vols. (Paris:Dalloz) 1932.
- La Crise de l’économie française à la fin de l'ancien régime et au début de la Révolution (Paris:PUF) 1943, which gained him a chair at the Sorbonne. It was introduced to an English-speaking audience by Shepard B. Clough in a review article "The Crisis in French Economy at the Beginning of the Revolution", The Journal of Economic History (1946) pp 191–96.
- Histoire économique et sociale de la France, 3 vols. (Paris:PUF) 1970-79.
