= Politis (magazine) =

French newspaper

Politis is a weekly left-wing "anti-capitalist" French news magazine published in Paris, France.

== History and profile ==
The magazine was established by Bernard Langlois under the title of Politis-le Citoyen in January 1988. Before it was renamed as Politis the name of the magazine was changed to Le Nouveau Politis. The headquarters of the magazine is in Paris, and it was previously published on a monthly basis.

Although Politis has a left-wing stance it has no political affiliation and publishes articles by the figures from various leftist parties and organizations, including French Communist Party (PCF), the New Anti-Capitalist Party (NPA), ATTAC and the Alternatifs movement. The magazine has also an ecologist approach.

Politis is financed through subscription. In 1996 the magazine had a circulation of 25,000 copies.
