= Communisme =

- Discipline: History of communism
- Language: French

Publication details
- History: 1982–present
- Frequency: Biannually

Standard abbreviations
- ISO 4: Communisme

Indexing
- ISSN: 0751-3496

Communisme is a French multidisciplinary academic journal in the field of communist studies, focusing in particular on the history of communism, founded in 1982 by Annie Kriegel and Stéphane Courtois. The starting objective of the journal has been to scientifically analyze the history of communism.

== History ==
=== Description ===
This French biannual multidisciplinary journal brought together specialists of different generations and targeted young people. The editorial board included: Nicolas Werth, Marc Lazar, Philippe Buton, Michel Hastings, Karel Bartosek and Denis Peschanski. Published works include both the teleological (political and doctrinal side) and social (relationships with society, social settlements) dimensions of communism.

=== Evolution ===
Access to archives of the Comintern, following the collapse of the communist regimes of Eastern Europe, was interpreted by Stéphane Courtois as providing an opportunity to create a true history of communism. This approach has been criticized as "aimed at justifying a rewrite of history, the craze for suspecting all "affairs", the explicit desire to exploit the political history of communism in trying to present himself as the sole possessor of the truth of communism".

=== Departures ===
Since 1993, a significant portion of the editorial board of the Communisme journal distanced themselves to express their disagreement with the evolution of the journal. Numerous stirrings agitated the editorial team of the journal, especially the Jean Moulin matter (when he was accused of being a Soviet agent) and the publication of the Black Book of Communism (under the direction of Courtois, who put Nazism and Communism on the same plane in his preface). This resulted in the resignations of the core of the editorial board, including Karel Bartosek and Nicolas Werth.

The historian Denis Peschanski, who was among the first contributors to the journal "motivated by a desire to make communism a scientific subject" left because he did not feel in tune with the editorial line. He explained that "the collapse of the team began when a renewed police-related history appeared of the PCF which was a "scoop".

== See also ==
- American Communist History journal (US)
