= Lucien Goldmann =

Romanian-French philosopher, Marxist theoretician, and sociologist (1913–1970)

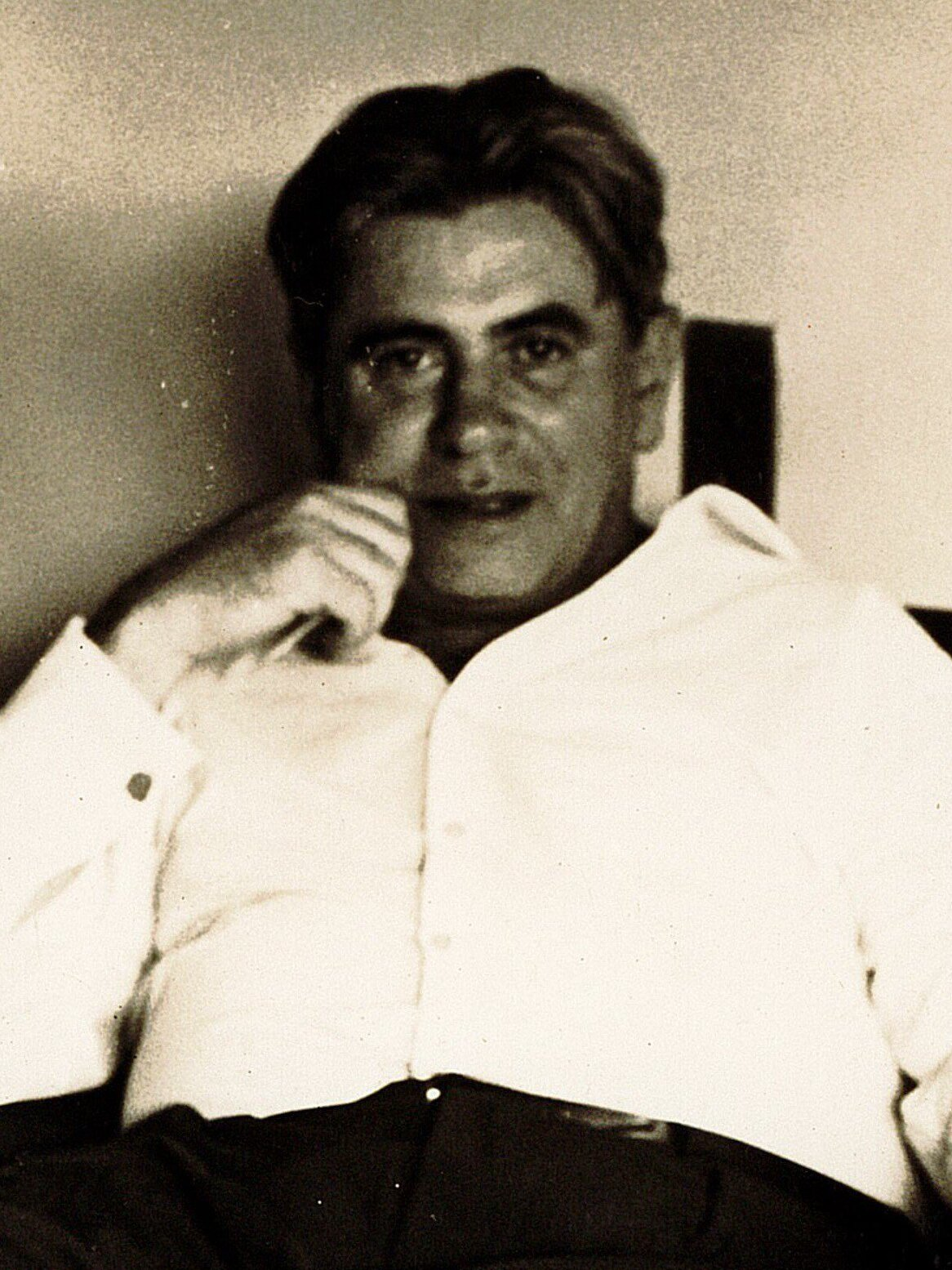
- Goldmann in 1964
- Born: 20 July 1913; Bucharest, Kingdom of Romania
- Died: 8 October 1970 (aged 57); Paris, France
- Spouse: Annie Goldmann

Education
- Education: University of Bucharest (LL.B.); University of Vienna; University of Paris; University of Zurich (PhD, 1945)
- Thesis: Mensch, Gemeinschaft und Welt in der Philosophie Immanuel Kants. Studien zur Geschichte der Dialektik (1945)
- Doctoral advisor: Karl Dürr

Philosophical work
- Era: 20th-century philosophy
- Region: Western philosophy
- School: Continental philosophy Western Marxism; Genetic epistemology
- Institutions: EHESS
- Doctoral students: Julia Kristeva; Sylvère Lotringer; Michael Löwy
- Main interests: Epistemology, sociology
- Notable ideas: Genetic structuralism

Lucien Goldmann (French: [ɡɔldman]; 20 July 1913 – 8 October 1970) was a French philosopher and sociologist of Romanian Jewish origin. A professor at the EHESS in Paris, he was a Marxist theorist. His wife was sociologist Annie Goldmann.

== Biography ==
Goldmann was born in Bucharest, Romania, but grew up in Botoșani. He studied law at the University of Bucharest and the University of Vienna under the Austromarxist jurist Max Adler. In 1934, he went to the University of Paris to study political economy, literature, and philosophy. He moved to Switzerland in November 1942, where he was placed in a refugee camp until 1943.

Through Jean Piaget's intervention, he was subsequently given a scholarship to the University of Zurich, where he completed his PhD in philosophy in 1945 under the supervision of Karl Dürr with a thesis entitled Mensch, Gemeinschaft und Welt in der Philosophie Immanuel Kants. Studien zur Geschichte der Dialektik (Man, Community and World in the Philosophy of Immanuel Kant: Studies in the History of the Dialectics).

Around 1950, he was living in Paris and writing his first book, The Hidden God.

In 1968, Goldmann was a visiting professor at Columbia University.

== Philosophy ==
Goldmann founded the theory of genetic structuralism in the 1960s. He was a Marxist humanist and was best known for his sociology of literature. In later life he became an important critic of structuralism.

While many Parisian leftists staunchly upheld Marxism's "scientificity" in the 1950s and 1960s, Lucien Goldmann insisted that Marxism was by then in severe crisis and had to reinvent itself radically if it were to survive. He rejected the traditional Marxist view of the proletariat and contested the structural Marxist movement. In fact, the popularity of such trends on the Left Bank was one reason why Goldmann's own name and work were eclipsed — this despite the acclaim of thinkers as diverse as Jean Piaget and Alasdair MacIntyre, who called him "the finest and most intelligent Marxist of the age."

He refused to portray his aspirations for humanity's future as an inexorable unfolding of history's laws, but saw them rather as a wager akin to Blaise Pascal's in the existence of God. "Risk", Goldmann wrote in his classic study of Pascal's Pensées and Jean Racine's Phèdre, "is possibility of failure, hope of success, and the synthesis of the three in a faith which is a wager are the essential constituent elements of the human condition". He called his work "dialectical" and "humanist". He sought to synthesize the genetic epistemology of Piaget with the Marxism of György Lukács. By 1968, however, according to Lionel Abel, he claimed to have renounced Marxism completely in favour of libertarianism and utopianism.

== Selected bibliography ==
=== In German ===
- Mensch, Gemeinschaft und Welt in der Philosophie Immanuel Kants (University of Zurich, 1945). Doctoral thesis.

=== In French ===
- Le dieu caché; étude sur la vision tragique dans les Pensées de Pascal et dans le théâtre de Racine. Paris: Gallimard, 1955.
- Recherches dialectiques. Paris: Gallimard, 1959.
- Pour une sociologie du roman. Paris: Gallimard, 1964.
- Sciences humaines et philosophie. Suivi de structuralisme génétique et création littéraire. Paris: Gonthier, 1966.
- Structures mentales et création culturelle. Paris: 10/18, 1970.
- Epistémologie et philosophie. Paris: Denoël, 1970.
- Lukacs et Heidegger. Paris: Denoël-Gonthier, 1973.

=== English translations ===
- The Hidden God: a study of tragic vision in the Pensees of Pascal and the tragedies of Racine. Trans. Philip Thody. London: Routledge, 1964.
- Immanuel Kant. Translated from the French and German by Robert Black. (London: New Left Books, 1971; Verso, 2011).
- "Is there a Marxist Sociology?". International Socialism 34. London. 1968.
- The Human Sciences and Philosophy. London: Jonathan Cape, 1973.
- The Philosophy of Enlightenment. Trans. Henry Maas. London: Routledge, 1973.
- Towards a Sociology of the Novel. 1964. Trans. Alan Sheridan. New York: Tavistock Publications, 1975.
- "The Epistemology of Sociology". Telos 18 (Winter 1976–77). New York: Telos Press.
- Cultural Creation in Modern Society Introduction by William Maryl and Translated by Bart Grahl (New York: Telos Press, 1976).
- Essays on Method in the Sociology of Literature Translated and edited by William Q. Boelhower (New York: Telos Press, 1979).
- "Genet's The Balcony: A Realist Play." Trans. Robert Sayre. Praxis: A Journal of Radical Perspectives on the Arts 4 (1978): 123-131. Trans. of "Une Pièce réaliste: Le Balcon de Genet" in Les Temps Modernes 171 (June 1960).
- Lukacs and Heidegger: Towards a New Philosophy. Trans. William Q. Boelhower. London: Routledge, 2009.
