= Claudie Weill =

French historian

- Born: 1945
- Died: September 2018 (aged 72–73)
- Occupation: Historian

Claudie Weill (1945 – 29 September 2018) was a French historian. She worked on the history of the German working world. She was also a specialist on Rosa Luxemburg.

== Partial publications ==
- Claudie Weill, Les cosmopolites - Socialisme et judéité en Russie (1897–1917), Paris, Éditions Syllpse, Collection "Utopie critique", févr. 2004, ISBN 2-84797-080-0 (presentation), Phd (dir. Marc Ferro)
- Deutsche und russische Sozialdemokratie um die Jahrhundertwende
- À la rencontre de Rosa Luxembourg.
- Die deutsche Arbeiterbewegung 1844-1914, 1969
- Deux lettres inédites de Karl Liebknecht, 1969
- Le Syndicalisme en Allemagne, 1970
- Le Rôle de la social-démocratie allemande dans la formation de la social-démocratie russe, 1898-1904. 1973
- A propos du terme "Bolchevisme", 1975
- Cinquante ans de rapports entre patrons et ouvriers en Allemagne, t. II, depuis 1945, 1976
- Marxistes russes et social-démocratie allemande, 1898-1904, 1976
- Pavel Axelrod and the Development of Menshevism, 1977
- Nation et lutte de classe, 1977
- Les étudiants russes en Allemagne, 1900-1914, 1979
- Les Socialistes revolutionnaires, 1980
- Ein 'Modell Deutschland' in den Farben Frankreichs?, 1980
- Le Seminaire de Georges Haupt a l'Ecole des Hautes Etudes, 1980
- Le Lapsus des intellectuels, 1982
- Die Roten Studenten. Dokumente und Erinnerungen 1938-1945, 1982
- La "question des étrangers" : les étudiants russes en Allemagne; 1900-1914, 1982
- Juifs en Pologne. La question juive pendant l'entredeux-guerres, 1982
- Introduction a l'oeuvre theorique de Staline, tome I, 1982
- Le Shtetl. La bourgade juive de Pologne, 1985
- Rosa Luxemburg aujourd'hui, 1986
- Walter Benjamin im Exil. Zum Verhaltnis von Literaturpolitik und Aesthetik, 1987
- Die Kopfgeburten der Arbeiterbewegung oder Die Genossin Luxemburg bringt alles durcheinander (Les gestations cerebrales du mouvement ouvrier ou La camarade Luxemburg met tout sens dessus dessous), 1987
- L'internationale et l'autre : les relations inter-ethniques dans la IIe Internationale (Discussions et débats), 1987
- Le roman de Tatiana, 1987
- Kautskys russisches Dossier. Deutsche Sozialdemokraten als Treuhander des russischen Parteivermogens 1910-1915 (le dossier russe de Kautsky. Des social-democrates allemands depositaires de l'avoir du parti russe 1910-1915), 1987
