= Annie Kriegel =

French historian (1926–1995)

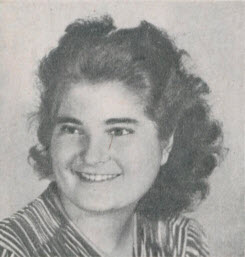
- Annie Kriegel in 1947
- Born: Annie Becker; 9 September 1926; Paris, France
- Died: 26 August 1995 (aged 68); Paris, France
- Occupation: Historian
- Spouse(s): Guy Besse; Arthur Kriegel
- Relatives: Jean-Jacques Becker (brother); Maurice Kriegel-Valrimont (brother-in-law)

Academic background
- Education: École normale supérieure de jeunes filles University of Paris 1 Panthéon-Sorbonne
- Doctoral advisor: Ernest Labrousse

Annie Kriegel (née Annie Becker; 9 September 1926 – 26 August 1995) was a French historian, a leading expert on communist studies and the history of Communism, a cofounder (1982) of the academic journal Communisme along with Stéphane Courtois. She was also a columnist for Le Figaro.

== Career ==
Kriegel joined the French Communist Party (PCF) as a student in 1945 and remained a member until 1957. From October 1951 to December 1953 she was a member of the federal bureau of PCF and from 1952 headed the section of education and ideological combat. She lost her position after siding with Pablo Picasso whose portrait of Joseph Stalin was criticised inside the party. She changed her political views following Nikita Khrushchev's denunciation of Stalinism in On the Cult of Personality and Its Consequences (1956) and became an outspoken anticommunist.

From 1954 she pursued research on the Communist movement in France at Sorbonne under the direction of Ernest Labrousse, which resulted in two theses: Aux origines du communisme français 1914-1920 (defended 1964) and La croissance de la CGT 1918-1921, essai statistique (published 1966). She shifted from her background in history towards a sociological approach in the process. From 1962 she wrote articles on Eastern Europe and Communism for France observateur under the pseudonyms Stanislas Ligier and David Ellimer at the invitation of François Furet.

In 1964, she joined the University of Reims, a former Catholic institution abolished in 1793, which was being re-established at the time, then took up the first chair in political sociology at the Paris Nanterre University in 1969, where she remained until her retirement in 1992. Between 1967 and 1970 she published in the bi-monthly Quinzaine littéraire linked to the anti-Stalinist Left. In 1970 she began writing for Le Figaro at the invitation of Raymond Aron whom she replaced as editor in 1977 after becoming a regular columnist in 1976.

The journal Communisme, founded with Stéphane Courtois in 1982, was an extension of her seminar on the subject at Nanterre.

In 1990, she critised the Gayssot Act, which criminalised Holocaust denial, as “legitimising an unbearable Jewish thought police”.

== Family ==
Her brother was the historian Jean-Jacques Becker, and she was married to Arthur Kriegel, a brother of Maurice Kriegel-Valrimont.

== Commemoration ==
The Association Annie Kriegel, of which Emmanuel Le Roy Ladurie was the first president and Stéphane Courtois the secretary-general, is named in her honour. It was founded with the aim of supporting social science research in 2000 in Saint-Valéry-sur-Somme.

The Association for the Memory of Past and Present Crimes of Communism (Association pour la mémoire des crimes historiques et actuels du communisme) was founded in 2012 in Villedieu-sur-Indre with the aim of continuing the work of Annie Kriegel and Stéphane Courtois by “publicising the reality of different Communist regimes since 1917”, including “the present dictatorships of China, Vietnam, North Korea and Cuba”.

== Principal works ==
- 1920. Le Congrès de Tours. Naissance du PCF, Paris: Julliard, 1964.
- (with Michelle Perrot) Le socialisme français et le pouvoir, Paris: Études et documentation internationale, 1966.
- Les Communistes français : essai d’ethnographie politique, Paris: Seuil, 1968 (2nd edition, with Guillaume Bourgeois, 1985).
- Le Pain et les roses : jalons pours une histoire des socialismes, Paris: PUF, 1968.
- Les Grands Procès dans les systèmes communistes, Paris: Gallimard, 1972.
- Communismes au miroir français, Paris: Gallimard, 1974.
- Les internationales ouvrières (1864-1943), 4th edition, Paris: PUF, 1975.
- (with Donald Blackmer) The International Role of the Communist Parties of Italy and France, Cambridge, MA: Harvard University Center for International Affairs, 1975.
- 'The French Communist Party and the Fifth Republic', in Communism in Italy and France, ed. Donald Blackmer and Sidney Tarrow, Princeton, NJ: Princeton University Press, 1975, pp. 69–86. doi:10.1515/9781400867387-006
- Un autre communisme?, Paris: Hachette, 1977.
- Les Juifs et le monde moderne. Essai sur les logiques d’émancipation, Paris, Seuil, 1977.
- Le communisme au jour le jour : chroniques du Figaro (1976-1979), Paris: Hachette, 1979.
- 'Public Opinion, Intellectuals and Terrorism in Western Europe', in International Terrorism: Challenge and Response: Proceedings of the Jerusalem Conference on International Terrorism (1979), ed. Benjamin Netanyahu, New Brunswick: Transaction Books, 1981, pp. 172–179.
- Ce que j’ai cru comprendre (memoir), Paris: Robert Laffont, 1991.

== Sources ==
- Aurell, Jaume [in Spanish] (2006), "Autobiographical Texts as Historiographical Sources: Rereading Fernand Braudel and Annie Kriegel" (PDF), Biography, 29 (3): 425–445, ISSN 0162-4962
