= Christian Jambet =

French philosopher and Islamologist

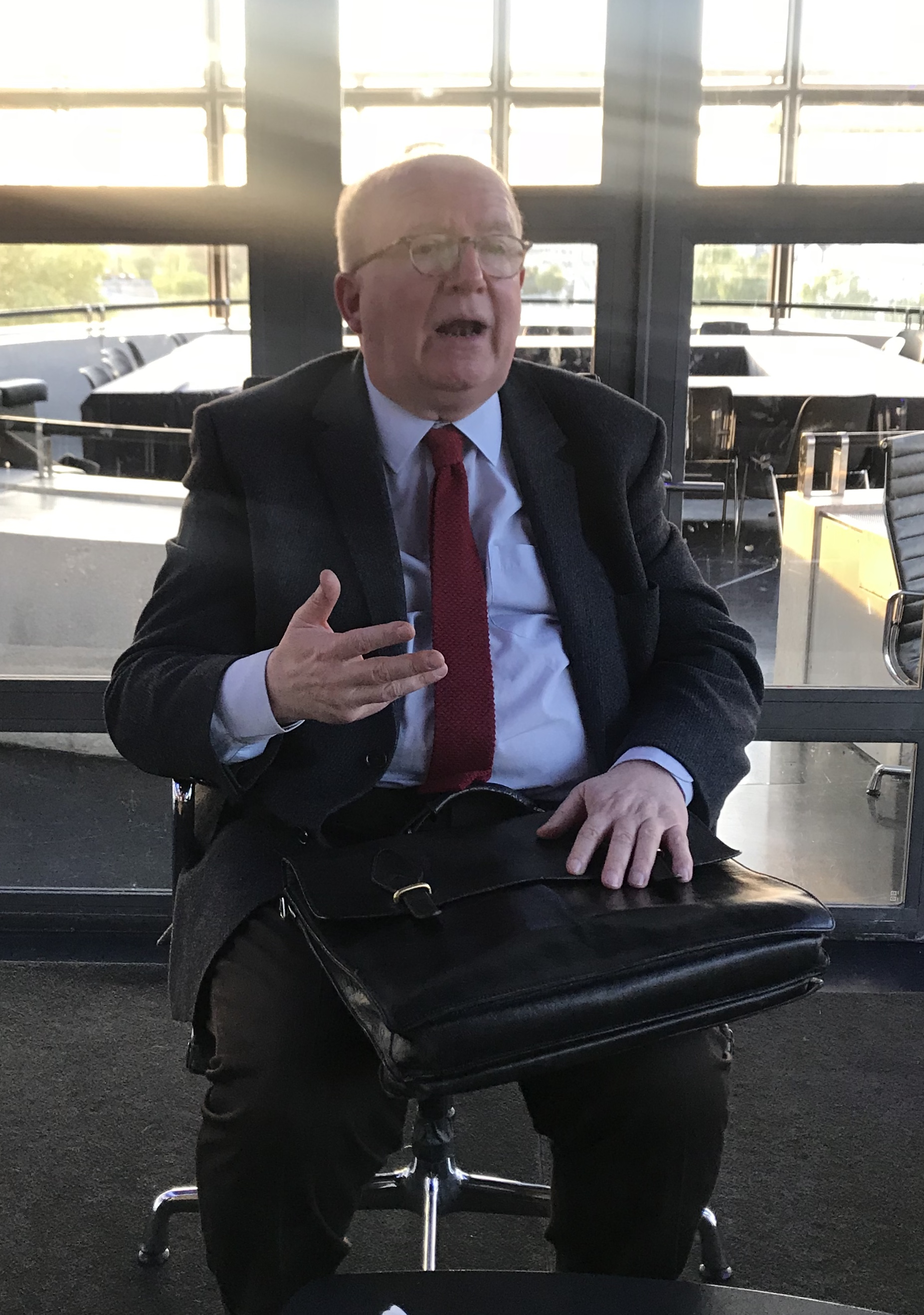
Christian Jambet in 2018

Christian Jambet (French: [kʁistjɑ̃ ʒɑ̃bɛ]; born 23 April 1949, Algiers, Colonial Algeria) is a French philosopher and Islamologist. He was a student of Henry Corbin. His work has engaged with Nizari Isma'ilism and has explored the thought of Avicenna, Mulla Sadra, and Nasir al-Din al-Tusi among others. In his treatment of these thinkers, he notes the lasting influence of figures associated with Neoplatonism such as Plotinus and Proclus (cf. Theology of Aristotle). He was inducted as a member of L'academie Francaise in 2024.

== Publications ==
=== Essais ===
- 1976: Apologie de Platon, Essais de métaphysique, coll. « Théoriciens », Éditions Grasset, 249 p.
  With Guy Lardreau, Ontologie de la révolution :
  - 1976: I. L'ange. Pour une cynégétique du semblant, coll. « Figures », Éditions Grasset.
  - 1978: II. Le Monde. Réponse à la question « Qu'est-ce que les droits de l'homme ? », coll. « Figures », Éditions Grasset, 281 p.
- 1983: La Logique des Orientaux. Henry Corbin et la science des formes, coll. « L'Ordre philosophique », Éditions du Seuil, 315 p.
- 1990: La Grande résurrection d'Alamût. Les formes de la liberté dans le shî'isme ismaélien, Verdier, Lagrasse, 418 p.
- 2002: L'Acte d'être. La philosophie de la révélation chez Mulla Sadra, coll. « L'espace intérieur », Fayard, 447 p.
- 2003: Le Caché et l'apparent, coll. « Mythes et religions », L'Herne, 206 p.
- 2004: with Mohammad Ali Amir-Moezzi : Qu'est-ce que le shî'isme ?, Fayard, 386 p.
- 2007: with Jean Bollack and Abdelwahab Meddeb : La Conférence de Ratisbonne, enjeux et controverses, Bayard, 115 p.
- 2008: Mort et résurrection en islam, L'au-delà selon Molla Sadra, coll. « Spiritualités », Albin Michel.
- 2011: Qu'est-ce que la philosophie islamique, folio essais.
- 2016: Le gouvernement divin. Islam et conception politique du monde, CNRS éditions, ISBN 978-2271069962

=== Commented translations ===
- 1994: Oscar Wilde : Ballade de la geôle de Reading, trad. et postface de CJ, Verdier, 104 p.
- 1996: Nazîroddîn Tûsî : La Convocation d'Alamût, Somme de philosophie ismaélienne, Verdier, 375 p.
- 1998: Jalâloddîn Rûmî : Soleil du réel, Poèmes d'amour mystique, Imprimerie nationale, 227 p.
- 2000: Se rendre immortel, suivi de la traduction de Mollâ Sadrâ Shîrâzî : Traité de la résurrection, Fata Morgana, 186 p.

=== Editions and important prefaces ===
- 1975: Gilles Susong : La Politique d'Orphée, Essai sur la tradition despotique en Grèce ancienne, Grasset.
- 1987: Victor Farias, "Heidegger et le Nazisme", Verdier.
- 1991: Les homélies clémentines, Verdier.
- 1992: Leili Echghi : Un temps entre les temps, L'imam, le chi'isme, l'Iran, Le Cerf.
- Henry Corbin :
  - 1993: Itinéraire d'un enseignement, Institut français de recherche en Iran.
  - 1994: Trilogie ismaelienne, Verdier.
  - 2001: Suhrawardi d'Alep, Fata Morgana.
  - 2003: Sohrawardi : Le livre de la sagesse orientale, Gallimard
  - 1999: Correspondance Corbin-Ivanow, Peeters.
- 2000: Isabelle de Gastine, translation of Nezâmi : Les sept portraits, Fayard.
- 2001: Michel Cazenave : La chute vertigineuse, Arma Artis.
- 2005: S.J. Badakhchani, edition and translation of Rawda-yi taslim: Paradise of submission, A medieval treatise on Ismaili thought, Tauris.
- 2005: Forough Farrokhzad: La conquête du jardin, Poèmes, 1951–1965, Lettres persanes.
- 2007: Farhad Daftary: Légendes des Assassins, Mythes sur les Ismaéliens, Vrin.
- 2009: Louis Massignon, Écrits mémorables, 178 texts (some unpublished) edited, presented and annotated under the direction of Christian Jambet, by François Angelier, François L'Yvonnet and Souâd Ayada, Robert-Laffont, coll. « Bouquins », 2 volumes.

=== Participation to collective works ===
- 2009: Philosophies d'ailleurs. Les pensées indiennes, chinoises et tibétaines, under the direction of Roger-Pol Droit, Éditions Hermann.

== See also ==
- Gauche prolétarienne
