= Gauche prolétarienne =

Proletarian Left Gauche prolétarienne
- Abbreviation: GP
- Leader: Benny Lévy
- Founded: September 1968
- Dissolved: November 1973
- Split from: UJC(ml)
- Newspaper: La Cause du peuple
- Ideology: Maoism; Mao-spontex; Libertarian Marxism
- Political position: Far-left

The Gauche prolétarienne (GP; lit. 'Proletarian Left') was a French Maoist political party which existed from 1968 to 1974. According to Christophe Bourseiller, the Gauche prolétarienne was "the most important numerically as well as in cultural influence" of all the French Maoist organizations after May 1968.

== History ==
The GP was formed in October 1968 by former members of the dissolved Union des jeunesses communistes marxistes-léninistes (UJC-ML), which in its turn had been founded by students at the École normale supérieure in Paris in December 1966. Its founders included Olivier Rolin and the brothers Benny and Tony Lévy, with Benny Lévy emerging as the undisputed leader of the GP. Heavily influenced by the Marxist philosopher Louis Althusser, they embraced Maoism in an effort to build a revolutionary organization independent of the French Communist Party (PCF).

At its inception, the GP undertook a relentless self-criticism over the UJC-ML's interpretation of the May 1968 events; the latter organization had been skeptical of the anti-authoritarian ethos of May 1968, which was thought to have made it underestimate the protest movement. During the winter and spring of 1969, the GP welcomed former student leaders Alain Geismar and Serge July into its ranks; its vision, as laid out in an April 1969 publication, was to "draw on the best of the May student movement, fuse it with Maoist practice, and end up with a genuine proletarian movement." The group's libertarian and spontaneous approach to Mao's thought caused its ideology to become known as "Mao-spontex"; originally used pejoratively, the label was taken from Spontex, the brand name of a cleaning sponge.

Prominent people who were at one point members of the GP include Serge July, Olivier Rolin, Frédéric H. Fajardie, Gérard Miller, Jean-Claude Milner, Marin Karmitz, André Glucksmann, Gilles Susong, Christian Jambet, Guy Lardreau, Daniel Rondeau, Olivier Roy, Judith Miller, Dominique Grange, and Gilles Millet. A group of former members became core members of the New Philosophers in the 1970s. Several members of the group were involved with the founding of the French daily Libération which evolved into a centre left mainstream mass circulation daily newspaper.

== See also ==
- Autonomism
- Armed Nuclei for Popular Autonomy
- Murder of Pierre Overney
- Operaismo
