= Wieviorka =

Wieviorka is a surname. Notable people with the surname include:

- Annette Wieviorka (born 1948), French historian
- Michel Wieviorka (born 1946), French sociologist
- Olivier Wieviorka (born 1960), French historian
- Sylvie Wieviorka (born 1950), French psychiatrist, academic, and politician
