= La Cause du peuple =

- Proletarians of all countries, Oppressed Peoples and Nations, Unite!
- Owner: Gauche prolétarienne (1968-1972)
- Founder: Roland Castro
- Founded: 1968, refounding in the 2010s
- Political alignment: Communism; Marxism-Leninism-Maoism; Proletarian internationalism Anti-imperialism; Anti-revisionism; Historical: Mao-Spontex (1968-1972)
- Headquarters: Paris
- Sister newspapers: Solange Creton; Libération (Until 1972)
- Website: https://www.causedupeuple.net/

La Cause du peuple was a French newspaper. The newspaper was founded on May 1, 1968 by Roland Castro and was the press organ of the party Gauche prolétarienne (GP).

When the GP was banned by the Gaullist state in 1970, promoting La Cause du peuple and selling it on the street became a badge of honor for left-leaning intellectuals such as Jean-Paul Sartre, Simone de Beauvoir, Claude Lanzmann, Jean-Luc Godard and François Truffaut.

In the 2010s and 2020s, La Cause du Peuple was refounded. Its editorial line is radically anti-imperialist and anti-revisionist, following Marxist-Leninist-Maoist principles and the universal contributions of President Gonzalo.

== See also ==
- Maoism in France
- Marxism–Leninism–Maoism
- May 1968 events in France
- Mao-Spontex
