= Alain Geismar =

French politician and physicist

Alain Geismar (French: [alɛ̃ ʒɛsmaʁ]; born 17 July 1939) is a French politician, physicist, and Honorary Inspector General of Education.

He was one of the student leaders during the unrest of May 1968 in France.

== Biography ==
Geismar was born in Paris to an Alsatian Jewish family. He attended the Lycée Janson-de-Sailly high school and later became the fourth leader of the Union of Communist Students alongside André Senik.

Geismar is married to Sylvie Wieviorka, deputy mayor of the Parti Socialiste (PS) of the 2nd arrondissement of Paris. He was previously married to Rédith Estenne, with whom he had two sons, François (b. 1965) and Pierre (1973–2006).

== Politics ==
While attending the National School of Mines in Nancy, Geismar began his political career campaigning for the Étudiants socialistes unifiés (ESU), the Unified Socialist Students. He became the organization's national leader under the direction of Jean Poperen, his former history teacher at Janson de Sailly. In 1965, he became deputy secretary-general of the National Union of Higher Education (SNESup), opposing the orthodoxy of the French Communist Party (PCF) and the so-called "leftist" tendency. By the end of 1966, he left the Unified Socialist Party (Parti socialiste unifié, PSU) to become the elected secretary-general of SNESup on the basis of a motion "for a small cultural revolution at the University" in late 1967.

On 2 May 1968 Geismar became one of the leaders of May 68 with Jacques Sauvageot (vice-president of the National Union of Students of France) and Daniel Cohn-Bendit (Mouvement du 22 Mars) and joined the Movement of 22 March on 8 May.

By the end of 1968, he was leading a Maoist organization with his partner Benny Lévy, the Gauche prolétarienne (GP). On 22 October 1970 he was sentenced to 18 months in a Fresnes prison for his acts on reconstituting the dissolved movement.

Once out of prison, Geismar continued working in politics. On 18 June 1976 he signed the Appel du 18 joint manifesto supporting 'the total decriminalisation' of cannabis.

In 1984, Geismar was appointed as deputy director-general of IT Agency (ADI) by its president, Charlie Garrigues, and became the director of ADI's education division. He helped install computers in prisons to prepare prisoners for civilian life. In 1987, the ADI's education division was abolished and returned to its original administrative functions.

In 1986, he joined the French Socialist Party, and he was appointed Inspector-General of National Education on the 16th of October, 1990.

In May 1991, he entered the cabinet of Lionel Jospin under Deputy Director André Laignel's cabinet in the Michel Rocard government. Then, he became Minister of State, Minister of National Education (Édith Cresson government). In 1992, he joined the office of Jean Glavany, the Secretary of State for Technical Education.

From 2001 to his retirement in July 2004, he was in charge of education and educational research at various universities in France, as well as an adviser for the mayor of Paris, Bertrand Delanoë.

== Works ==
- The student revolt: the organizers speak (with Jacques Sauvageot and Daniel Cohn-Bendit ), presentation by Hervé Bourges, Éditions du Seuil, collection "The immediate history", 1968, 128 p.
- Towards the Civil War (with Serge July and Erlyn Morane), Éditions et publications premiers, collection Stratégies, Denoël, 1969, 440 p.
- Why we are fighting. Statement by Alain Geismar at his trial (20, 21 and 22 October 1970), Paris, Maspero, 1970, 28 p.
- Minutes from Alain Geismar's trial, preface by Jean-Paul Sartre, Paris, France, Éditions Libres-Hallier, Documents L'Idiot international, 1970, 219 p.
- L'engrenage terroriste. Paris: Fayard, 1981. ISBN 9782213009711
- Mon Mai 1968. Paris: Perrin, 2008. ISBN 9782262028251
