= Géraldine Martineau =

French actress

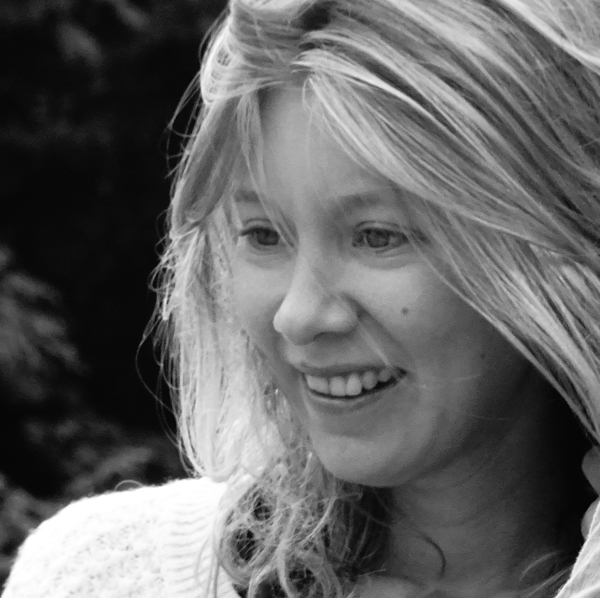
- Martineau in 2017
- Born: 1984 or 1985 (age 40–41); Nantes, France
- Occupation(s): Actress, theatre director
- Years active: 2004–present

Géraldine Martineau (born 1984 or 1985) is a French actress, originally from Nantes, France. She started acting when she was 8 years old. At the age of 17, she was accepted into the Cours Florent and started a course in the Classe Libre (a free 2-year acting course), before she entered the Conservatoire national supérieur d'art dramatique two years later. She has acted on stage, on television and in movies.

== Theater ==
=== Actress ===
Year	Title	Author	Director	Notes
2004–05	A Day at the Museum	Jean-Michel Ribes	Jean-Michel Ribes	
2008	Penthesilea	Heinrich von Kleist	Jean Liermier	
2008–09	The Wild Duck	Henrik Ibsen	Yves Beaunesne	
2010–11	Terre océane	Daniel Danis	Véronique Bellegarde	
2010–11	Roberto Zucco	Bernard-Marie Koltès	Pauline Bureau	
2011	Paroles d’acteurs	Robert Garnier	Valérie Dréville	
2011–13	Twelfth Night	William Shakespeare	Jean-Michel Rabeux	
2011–14	Ouasmok ?	Sylvain Levey	Anne Contensou	
2012	Sunderland	Clément Koch	Stéphane Hillel	
2012	The Government Inspector	Nikolai Gogol	Tommy Weber	
2012–13	Isabelle et la Bête	Grégoire Solotareff	Véronique Bellegarde	
2013	L’Otage, Le Pain dur	Paul Claudel	Thomas Condemine	
2014	Corps étrangers	Stéphanie Marchais	Thibault Rossigneux	
2014	I Don't Remember Very Well	Gérard Watkins	Gérard Watkins	
2014–15	Sirènes	Pauline Bureau	Pauline Bureau	
2014–16	La Tragédie du belge	Sonia Bester	Isabelle Antoine & Sonia Bester	
2015–17	Dormir cent ans	Pauline Bureau	Pauline Bureau	
2015–17	Le Poisson belge	Léonore Confino	Catherine Schaub	Molière Award for Best Female Newcomer
2016	On a dit on fait un spectacle	Sonia Bester	Isabelle Antoine & Sonia Bester	
2018	Aime-moi	Géraldine Martineau	Zazon Castro & Géraldine Martineau	
2019	Pompier(s)	Jean-Benoît Patricot	Catherine Schaub	Nominated - Molière Award for Best Actress
2019	Déglutis, ça ira mieux	Andréa Bescond & Éric Métayer	Andréa Bescond & Éric Métayer	
2020	Boxes	Jane Birkin	Richard Brunel	
2020	Aime-moi	Géraldine Martineau	Zazon Castro & Géraldine Martineau	
2020–22	Le Bourgeois gentilhomme	Molière	Christian Hecq & Valérie Lesort	
2021	Pompier(s)	Jean-Benoît Patricot	Catherine Schaub	
2022	Le Crépuscule des singes	Alison Cosson & Louise Vignaud	Louise Vignaud	
2023	The Lady from the Sea	Henrik Ibsen	Géraldine Martineau	

=== Director ===
Year	Title	Author	Notes
2010	Miss Julie	August Strindberg	
2017–18	The Death of Tintagiles	Maurice Maeterlinck	
2018	Aime-moi	Géraldine Martineau	
2018–19	La Petite Sirène	Géraldine Martineau	Molière Award for Best Show for Young Audiences
2020	Aime-moi	Géraldine Martineau	
2020	Ce qu’on n’a pas dit	Noémie de Lattre	
2020	Est-ce que tu danses la nuit…	Christine Orban	
2020	Il y a plus d’une bête dans la jungle	Anne Le Ny	
2021–22	La princesse jaune / Djamileh	Camille Saint-Saëns / Georges Bizet	
2022	Libre !	Irène Jacob	
2022	Notes bleues	Blandine Rinkel	
2022	Le Quai aux fleurs	Kaouther Adimi	
2023	The Lady from the Sea	Henrik Ibsen	
2024	Prima Facie	Suzie Miller	
2024	L’Extraordinaire Destinée de Sarah Bernhardt	Géraldine Martineau	

== Filmography ==
=== Cinema ===
Year	Title	Role	Director	Notes
2007	Hellphone	Charlotte	James Huth	
2008	A Day at the Museum	The girl in green	Jean-Michel Ribes	
2009	La Fonte des neiges	Antoinette	Jean-Julien Chervier	
2010	Aglaée	Aglaée	Rudi Rosenberg	Short; Clermont-Ferrand International Short Film Festival - Best Actress
2010	Blanche	Blanche	Pierre Mazingarbe	Short
2011	Léa	Alice	Bruno Rolland	
2011	Les poissons préfèrent l'eau du bain	Sarah	Pierre Mazingarbe	Short
2012	The Lookout	Sonia	Michele Placido	
2012	Chantou	The young girl	Marion Cozzutti	Short
2012	Bye Bye maman	The beautician	Keren Marciano	Short
2012	Le Roi des Belges	Eve	Pierre Mazingarbe	Short
2012	Le jardin des Eden	Juliette	Sébastien Ors	Short
2015	Le nouveau	Aglaée	Rudi Rosenberg	
2015	Les chercheurs	Elsa	Aurélien Peilloux	Short
2016	Supermarket		Pierre Dugowson	Short
2017	Bloody Milk	Emma	Hubert Charuel	
2017	Marie-Francine	Anaïs	Valérie Lemercier	
2017	Jusqu'à écoulement des stocks		Pierre Dugowson	Short
2018	Le poulain	Géraldine	Mathieu Sapin	
2018	Les bonnes intentions	The learner driver	Gilles Legrand	
2018	La surface de réparation	Suzanne	Christophe Régin	
2018	Sur un AirBnb	Rita	Zazon	Short
2019	On ment toujours à ceux qu'on aime	Henriette	Sandrine Dumas	
2019	Boustifaille	Daphnée	Pierre Mazingarbe	Short
2021	Vaurien	Camille	Peter Dourountzis	
2022	Annie Colère	The abortion woman	Blandine Lenoir	
2024	Louise Violet	Félicie	Éric Besnard	

=== Television ===
Year	Title	Role	Director	Notes
2010	La commanderie	Flora	Didier Le Pêcheur	TV mini-series
2010	Interpol	Romane	Éric Le Roux	TV series (1 episode)
2011	Le juge est une femme	Nathalie Chazela	René Manzor	TV series (1 episode)
2013	Alias Caracalla, au coeur de la Résistance	Mado	Alain Tasma	TV mini-series
2014	Guillaume le Conquérant	Mathilde	Frédéric Compain	TV movie
2015–18	Martin, sexe faible	The boss	Paul Lapierre, Juliette Tresanini, ...	TV series (9 episodes)
2018	Le temps des égarés	Audrey	Virginie Sauveur	TV movie
2018	Les secrets	Justine	Christophe Lamotte	TV mini-series
2020	Si tu vois ma mère	Elodie	Nathanaël Guedj	TV movie
2020	Balthazar	Gwen Arzel	Mona Achache	TV series (1 episode)
2022	Yes vous aime	The left client	Guillaume Cremonese	TV series (1 episode)
2023	Sambre - Anatomy of a Crime	Nadine Fortin	Jean-Xavier de Lestrade	TV mini-series
