= Fidel Manrique =

Spanish anarchist

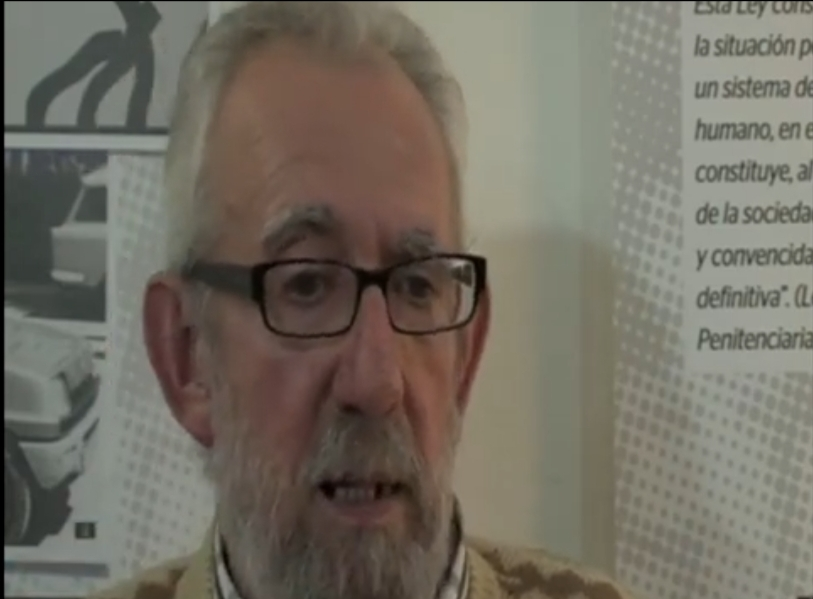

General Secretary of the CNT
- In office 21 July 2007 – December 2010
- Preceded by: Rafael Corrales
- Succeeded by: Alfonso Álvarez

Personal details
- Born: 1950 (age 75–76) Medina del Campo, Valladolid, Spain

Fidel Manrique Garrido (b. 1950) is a Spanish anarcho-syndicalist affiliated with the Confederación Nacional del Trabajo (CNT), a national trade union federation.

== Biography ==
Fidel Manrique was born in the Castilian city of Medina del Campo in 1950. He studied at the Escuela de Maestría Industrial in Santander and moved to Barcelona to work in the chemical industry in the late 1960s. In the Catalan capital, he became a convinced anarchist after reading Peter Kropotkin's book Mutual Aid and joined the Iberian Liberation Movement (MIL). During the Spanish transition to democracy, he moved back to Cantabria and helped to establish a local branch of the National Confederation of Labour (CNT).

In February 1978, Manrique and Fernando Merino participated in a bank robbery in Valladolid, during which they stole 1.5 million pesetas from a local savings bank. The following month, Manrique and Merino were arrested in Valladolid, along with 7 other members of the CNT's local branch. In 1980, Manrique was sentenced to 6 and a half years' imprisonment and Merino to 4 and a half years. They had both confessed to the robbery, which they committed to fund the CNT.

Despite a number of splits within the Spanish anarchist movement, he remained committed to anarchist activism into the 21st century. In 2007, he was elected as General Secretary of the CNT and served in the post until 2010. In 2010, Manrique published an article in Andalucía Libertaria in which he criticised democracy for political corruption, stating his belief that voting provided political legitimacy to a minority group of self-interested politicians and political parties. He was particularly critical of the austerity policies pursued by the government of José Luis Rodríguez Zapatero, which he saw as working in the benefit of the "exploiters", and sought to mobilised the CNT against it. Later that year, he joined the 2010 Spanish general strike, although he was critical of the participation of the Workers' Commissions (CCOO) and General Union of Workers (UGT), believing they were engaging in it as a publicity stunt. He saw the strike as the beginning of a process of the reorganisation of the Spanish labour movement.

Preceded by Rafael Corrales Valverde	General Secretary of the CNT; 2007–2010	Succeeded by Alfonso Álvarez
