= Armed Nuclei for Popular Autonomy =

Former French Maoist armed organization

Noyaux armés pour l'autonomie populaire NAPAP
- Leaders: Frédéric Oriach; Christian Harbulot (alleged)
- Dates active: 1976–1981
- Active regions: Île-de-France
- Ideology: Communism; Maoism
- Status: Inactive

Armed Nuclei for Popular Autonomy (French: Noyaux armés pour l'autonomie populaire), also known as NAPAP, was a French Maoist armed organization formed in December 1976. According to the police, the leader of the NAPAP was Christian Harbulot. Members of the NAPAP influenced the Communist Combatant Cells in Belgium.

== Members ==
- Frédéric Oriach
- Henri Savouillan
- Michel Lapeyre
- Jean-Paul Gérard

== Bombings claimed by NAPAP ==
- 12 January 1976: assault of Paul Gardent, director general of Charbonnages de France (claimed by Vaincre et vivre).
- 23 March 1977: assassination of Jean-Antoine Tramoni, the murderer of Pierre Overney.
- 26 March 1977: attack on the Renault-Flins car park.
- 3 April 1977: fire from the Confédération des syndicats libres
- 6 June 1977: attacks against the Usinor factory in Thionville and against Chrysler-France in Paris.
- Summer 1977: series of anti-nuclear attacks with the help of anarchist militants from the Internationalist Revolutionary Action Groups.
- 8 October 1977: attack on the home of the Minister of Justice Alain Peyrefitte.
- 14 October 1977: attacks against the Palace of Justice and the Ministry of Justice in Paris.
- 21 October 1977: attack on Mercedes.
- 25 June 1978: on the night of 25 to 26, a 6kg bomb exploded at the Palace of Versailles. Claimed by NAPAP and then by the International Unemployment Group, it was in fact conducted by the Breton Liberation Front.
- 9 July 1980: attack against the German Railway Company.

== See also ==
- Gauche prolétarienne
- Mao-Spontex
