= Eshghi =

Persian-language name

- Language: Persian

Origin
- Region of origin: Iran

Other names
- Variant form: Echghi

Eshghi is a Persian name common in Iran. The numerical value of Eshghi is: 4 in Chaldean numerical system.

== People with Eshghi as last/family name ==
- Gohar Eshghi (born 1946), Iranian civil activist
- Leili Eshghi, Iranian sociologist
- Mirzadeh Eshghi (1894–1924), Iranian political writer
- Pasha Eshghi (born 1992), Canadian filmmaker
