= Concrete Utopia (disambiguation) =

Concrete utopia might refer to:

- Concrete Utopia, a South Korean film
- a name given for Architecture of Yugoslavia
- Concrete utopia movement, a political movement created by Roland Castro
