= Rafael Corrales =

Rafael Corrales may refer to:

- Rafael Corrales Ayala (1925–2015), Mexican politician, governor of Guanajuato from 1985 to 1991
- Rafael Corrales Valverde (born 1957), Spanish anarcho-syndicalist affiliated with the Confederación Nacional del Trabajo
