= VLR =

VLR may refer to:

== Organizations ==
- Vic Lee Racing, a UK auto racing team (1980s-2004)
- Vive la révolution (group), a political group in France (1968–1971)

== Transportation ==
- Vallenar Airport in Chile
- Vellore Cantonment railway station in India
- Delahaye VLR, a 1950s jeep-like vehicle
- Very light rail, a classification of public transport systems
  - Very Light Rail National Innovation Center in Dudley, Metropolitan Borough of Dudley, UK
  - Coventry Very Light Rail, a tram demonstrated in Coventry, UK
  - Revolution VLR, a railway demonstrated at former Buildwas railway station in Shropshire, UK
- Very long range aircraft, e.g. Consolidated B-24 Liberator

== Gaming ==
- Zero Escape: Virtue's Last Reward, a video game
- VLR (discussion forum), a discussion forum and news site about the video game Valorant and the Valorant Esports scene

== Other uses ==
- Variable lymphocyte receptor, a protein family
- Victorian Law Reports, a series of law reports in Australia
- Virginia Landmarks Register, a list of historic properties in Virginia, US
- Visitor Location Register, a database in a (cellular) GSM network
