= François Angelier =

French writer

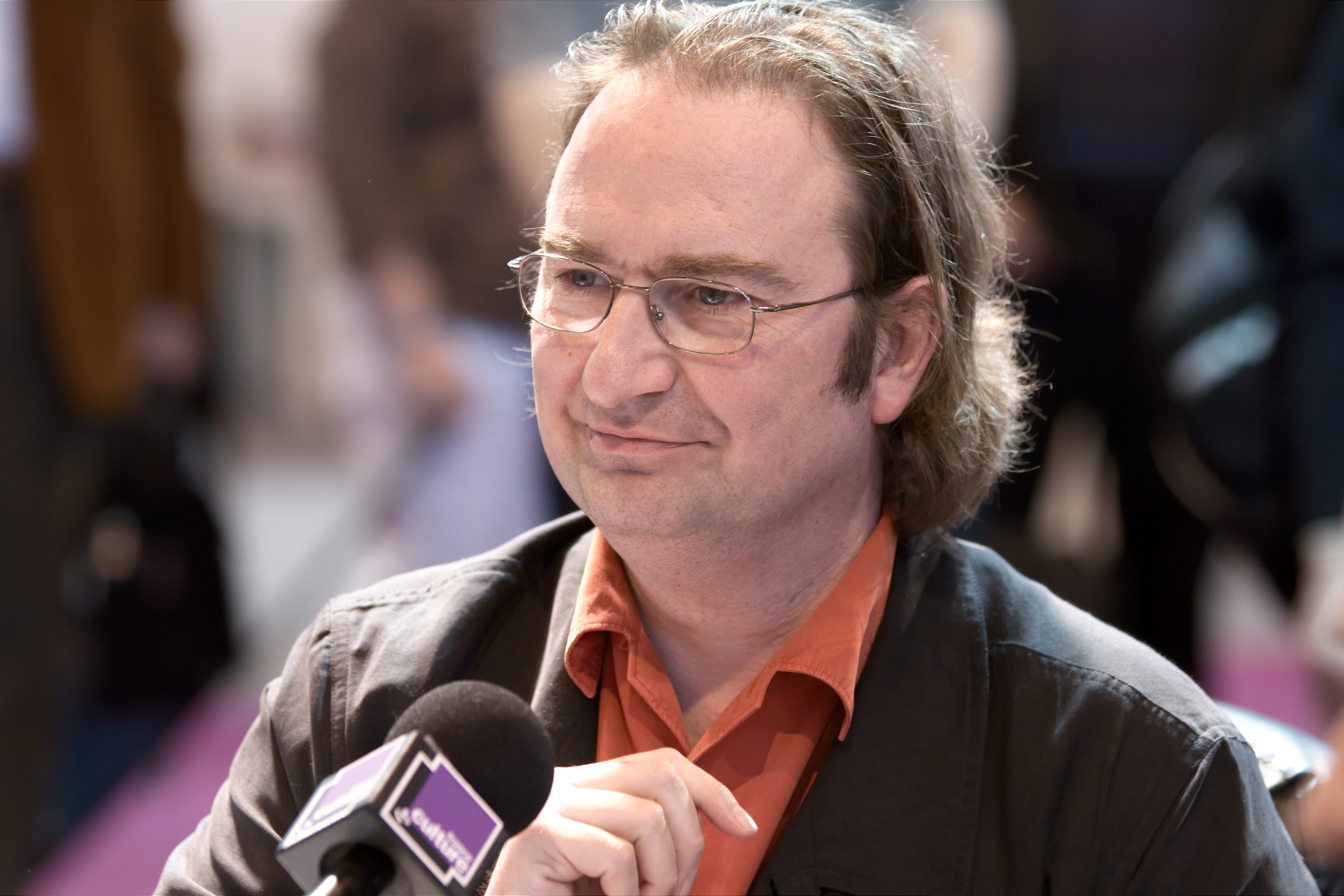
François Angelier in March 2010

François Angelier (born 22 August 1958) is a French journalist, presenter, essayist, biographer and author of fantasy novels.

== Biography ==
Angelier's early discovery of Wilfred Owen, Claude Seignolle, Michel de Ghelderode, Wolfgang Kubin, Gustav Meyrink and especially Jean Ray fired his interest in mauvais genres. After studying in Paris and a short time with a theatre troupe, Angelier made his radio debut in 1981 with a programme on H.P. Lovecraft. With Emmanuel Laurentin and Jean-Christophe Ogier, he launched Bande à Parte on the French radio station France Culture in summer 1991—a programme dedicated to fantasy, fiction and comic books.

== Awards ==
- Prix du Roman, Fantastic'Arts, Gérardmer 2001 for Le Templier.

== Bibliography ==
=== Novel ===
- Le Templier (Masque GF, 2001)

=== Anthologies ===
- La Nuit (Éd. J. Million, 1995)
- La Salette : apocalypse, pèlerinage et littérature (1856–1996) (Éd. J. Million, 2000, with Claude Langlois).

=== Essays, Biographies ===
- Le Drageoir aux épines ou l'intime souffrance de Joris-Karl Huysmans (1993);
- Saint François de Sales ou Monsieur des abeilles (Pygmalion "Chemins d’éternité", 1997);
- Paul Claudel : chemins d'éternité (Pygmalion "Chemins d’éternité", 2001);
- Claudel ou la conversion sauvage (Salvator "Juste un débat", 2003);
- Dictionnaire Jules Verne (Pygmalion, 2006).
