= Sylvie Wieviorka =

French psychiatrist and politician

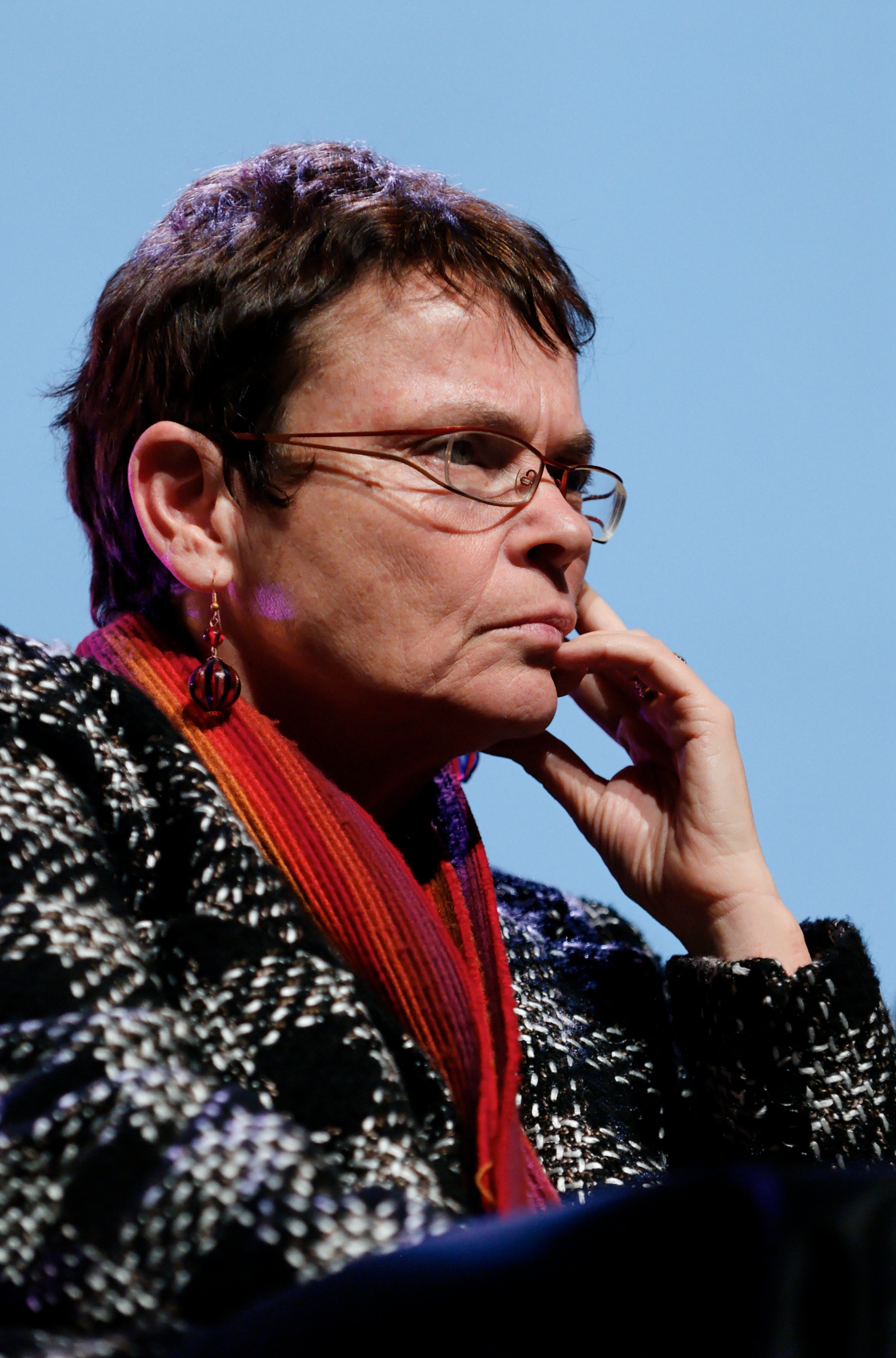
Sylvie Wieviorka in 2008

Sylvie Wieviorka (born February 3, 1950, in Paris), is a French psychiatrist, academic, and politician.

== Family ==
Wieviorka is the sister of historian Annette Wieviorka, sociologist Michel Wieviorka, and historian Olivier Wieviorka. Her paternal grandparents, who were Polish Jews, were arrested in Nice during World War II and murdered in Auschwitz. Her grandfather, Wolf Wiewiorka, was born on March 10, 1896, in Minsk, Belarus. Her grandmother, Rosa Wiewiorka, née Feldman, was born on August 10, 1897, in Siedlce, Poland. Their last address in Nice was 16 rue Reine Jeanne. They were deported in convoy No. 61, dated October 28, 1943, from the Drancy internment camp to Auschwitz. They were detained before at Camp de Beaune-la-Rolande. Her father, a refugee in Switzerland, and her mother, a refugee in Grenoble, survived the war.

== Medical and academic career ==
Wieviorka is a psychiatrist, and the medical director of a Parisian drug addiction center. She is the author of several books and numerous articles on drug addiction, and teaches at the University of Paris VIII. She is married to Alain Geismar, who was formerly a leader of the May 68 movement and advisor to Paris mayor Bertrand Delanoë.

== Political background ==
In her youth, Wieviorka was active in various neo-Communist left movements, including Maoist movements. In 1997, she joined the Socialist Party of France (PS). She had participated in the "drugs" commission of the PS since 1995, and spent several years afterward as the party's national delegate for drugs and drug addiction.

In 2001, she was the campaign director for Pierre Schapira, who led the "change d'ère" list for the second arrondissement of Paris during the 2001 municipal campaign, and became the first deputy mayor.

In 2001, Wieviorka became the Secretary of the section of the Socialist Party of the 2nd arrondissement of Paris, a position to which she was re-elected twice, in 2002 and 2005. She then joined the Federal Council, the Federal Bureau, then the Federal Secretariat of the Parisian PS. In 2005, she led the party at the Paris federation and led Parisian socialists through the municipal election of 2008.

Wieviorka was designated head of the list for the 2008 municipal elections in the second arrondissement, one step ahead of Bertrand Delanoë. This list won the first round of elections (32%), followed by the list of the outgoing Green mayor. By virtue of an agreement between the Socialist Party and the Greens, the SP's list merged with that of Green candidate Jacques Boutault, and left the head of the list to the latter. The combined list collected 68.34% of the votes in the second round. She became a regional advisor in May 2008, following the resignation of a regional councilor, and in November 2008, she co-hosted motion D for the Reims Congress, supported by Laurent Fabius, Martine Aubry, and IMF managing director Dominique Strauss-Kahn.

Wieviorka would remain deputy mayor until the municipal elections of 2014.
