= Vive la révolution (group) =

Long Live the Revolution Vive la révolution
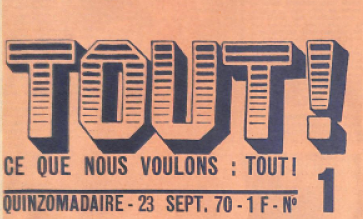
- The headline of the no. 1 of Tout! published by Vive la révolution.
- Abbreviation: VLR
- Leader: Roland Castro
- Founded: October 1968
- Dissolved: April 1971
- Split from: UJC (ml)
- Headquarters: Nanterre
- Newspaper: Tout!
- Ideology: Maoism; Libertarian socialism Mao-spontex
- Political position: Far-left

Long live the revolution (French: Vive la révolution, VLR) was a French libertarian Maoist group which appeared in 1968, led by Roland Castro and Tiennot Grumbach and founded by 40 people, mostly from the Maoist UJC (ml) and the 22 March Movement of Nanterre. Unlike many revolutionary Marxist-Leninist groups, VLR was distinguished by its festive and libertarian aspect.

== History ==
Founded by Maoist dissidents from the Union of Marxist-Leninist Communist Youth (UJC (ml)) and the Marxist-Leninist Communist Party of France (PCMLF), Vive le Communisme (VLC) appeared in October 1968 in the University of Nanterre.

In the 1969 French presidential election, VLC called for votes for the candidate of the Revolutionary Communist League, Alain Krivine.

In July 1969, VLC changed its name to Vive la révolution (VLR).

VLR dissolved itself in April 1971 but Tout! continued to appear until the July issue.

== Tout! ==
In 1970–1971, VLR published Tout! (English: All!), a French language newspaper with a spontaneist Maoist or even libertarian tendency, under the caption "Ce que nous voulons: tout", English: "What we want: everything"). With 50,000 copies printed, in 1971 the monthly was the most read and the most widely distributed in France among far-left journals. Jean-Paul Sartre was mentioned on the last page as being the publication director. With a few exceptions, no article was signed, except by initials or first names.

The 17 issues published were distinguished by a dominant iconographic part and the abundant use of flat-bottomed "psychedelic" color inks - adopted from the British underground press such as Oz, which, along with Actuel, was a unique case in the anti-commercial press of the time. Editorially, it had a very free and virulent tone. In particular, controversial themes for the time were discussed, including radical feminism and homosexuality, as well as many references to the Black Panthers.

== Notable members ==
Among its leaders were the architect Roland Castro, the gay militant writer Guy Hocquenghem, the feminist sociologists Nadja Ringart and Françoise Picq (who would participate in the creation of the MLF in 1970), the future diplomat François Bujon de l'Estang, Marc Hatzfeld, Stéphane Courtois (later co-author of the Black Book of Communism), and Jean-Paul Ribes, journalist and future president of the Support Committee for the Tibetan People.

Among the occasional cartoonists were Georges Wolinski and Siné.

In 1971, during the crackdown on a demonstration banned by the prefecture, one of the young VLR activists, Richard Deshayes, who was rescuing a demonstrator on the ground, was blinded and disfigured by a tear gas grenade fired by the special brigades of intervention. The photo of his bloodied face made the headlines of Tout! and was displayed around France on a poster.

== Bibliography ==
- Beuvain, Christian; Schoumacher, Florent (2012). "Chronologie des maoïsmes en France, des années 1930 à 2010". Dissidences (in French). ISSN 2118-6057. OCLC 793464080.
- Dejean, Mathieu (9 March 2018). "Comment le maoïsme a séduit une partie de la jeunesse des années 68 en France". Les Inrockuptibles (in French). Paris: Les Editions indépendantes. ISSN 0298-3788. OCLC 716205151.
- McGrogan, Manus (2010). Tout! in context 1968-1973: French radical press at the crossroads of far left, new movements and counterculture (PDF) (PhD). Portsmouth: University of Portsmouth. OCLC 1063530614. Archived from the original (PDF) on 12 May 2013.
