= La Fonte des neiges =

- Directed by: Jean-Julien Chervier
- Written by: Jean-Julien Chevrier
- Produced by: Sylvie Brenet
- Starring: Marc Beffa; Géraldine Martineau; Zazon
- Cinematography: Pierre Stoeber
- Edited by: Julie Dupré
- Music by: Steffen Breum
- Production company: Vonvon Films Associés
- Distributed by: Les Films du Requin
- Release date: 31 January 2009 (Clermont-Ferrand International Short Film Festival)
- Running time: 26 minutes
- Country: France
- Language: French

La Fonte des neiges (English title: Thawing out; literally The melting of the snows) is a 2009 short comedy drama film directed by Jean-Julien Chervier.

== Synopsis ==
La Fonte des neiges is about a few days of a holiday when Leo, a twelve-year-old child, is forced to follow his mother to a nudist camp. At first deeply shy, he responds by wearing extra clothes. After meeting Antoinette, a playful nudist girl, Leo slowly becomes more relaxed and is revealed as a responsible and gentle person. He gets to know Antoinette better throughout the film and the discovery of his body, as well as the first feelings of love take on the appearance of a fairy tale with a hallucinogenic quality.

== Reception ==
The film, which deals carefully with a subject that could be controversial, was broadcast on the French-German national television channel Arte. It has been called "A very fine short film". The film was shown in 2009 at the Brooklyn Film Festival. It was shown at the Lisbon International Independent Film Festival in 2010. It was shown at the 12th Festival du Film Court Francophone at Vaulx-en-Velin in January 2012. It was also shown at international festivals such as Ebensee and Clermont-Ferrand.

== Cast ==
- Marc Beffa as Léo
- Géraldine Martineau as Antoinette
- Zazon as Léo's mother
- Laurent Roth
- Natanaël Sylard
- Philippe Caulier
- Laura Luna
