= Benny Lévy =

French philosopher (1945–2003)

- Born: 28 August 1945; Cairo, Kingdom of Egypt
- Died: 15 October 2003 (aged 58); Jerusalem, Israel

Philosophical work
- Era: 20th-century philosophy
- Region: Western philosophy
- School: Continental philosophy
- Main interests: Marxism, existentialism, existential phenomenology, Talmud
- Notable ideas: Return to Jewish tradition

Benny Lévy (French: [bɛni levi]; also Pierre Victor; 28 August 1945 – 15 October 2003) was a philosopher, political activist and author. A political figure of May 1968 in France, he was the disciple and last personal secretary of Jean-Paul Sartre from 1974 to 1980. Along with him, he helped found the French newspaper Libération in 1972.

After having encountered the Jewish philosophy of Emmanuel Levinas in 1978, he effected a return to Jewish tradition. In 2000, he founded the Institut d'études lévinassiennes in Jerusalem with Alain Finkielkraut and Bernard-Henri Lévy.

Benny Lévy is known for his unusual itinerary from Maoism to Judaism, or "from Mao to Moses", which was also followed by a few other philosophers of his generation.

== May 68 and the Gauche prolétarienne ==
Born in Egypt to a Jewish family originally from Aleppo, in present-day Syria. Benny Lévy grew up without experiencing Judaism as a faith. He left Egypt after the Suez Crisis of 1956 and immigrated to Belgium and then France with his family. His elder half-brother, Eddy Lévy, stayed in Egypt, converted to Islam in 1956 and changed his name to Adil Rifaat. The historian of mathematics Tony Lévy is his brother.

Benny Lévy soon proved to be a brilliant student and completed his studies at the École Normale Supérieure, learning under such key intellectual figures as Marxist philosopher Louis Althusser and Jacques Derrida, founder of deconstruction. He entered the Union des étudiants communistes (UEC), a student communist group, and then at his foundation in 1966 the Maoist Union des jeunesses communistes marxistes-léninistes (UJC - ml). He became one of the main leaders of this latter organization after Robert Linhart. Benny Lévy was an important figure during the May 68 Student Revolt. After these events, the direction of the UJC-ml was put in minority, and founded the Maoist Gauche prolétarienne (GP, Proletarian Left). Taking the pseudonym of Pierre Victor, Benny Lévy was one of its main leaders, along with Alain Geismar.

As editor of the Maoist newspaper La Cause du Peuple (The Cause of the People), he was arrested repeatedly by the French police, who were determined to suppress the unrest. By 1970, with arrests occurring more frequently, Lévy and the other editors decided to turn to Jean-Paul Sartre, whom they knew benefited from protection from police harassment. Sartre responded by adding his name to the list of editors, and the arrests indeed stopped. It was then discovered by the government that the proletarian leftwing leader Pierre Victor was, in fact, a stateless refugee. The passport given to him by the United Nations was confiscated, and he was ordered to appear at the local police station once every two weeks with his relatives and a lawyer. The organisation was outlawed in 1970. As stateless and leader of an outlawed organisation, Benni Lévy was forced to clandestinity until 1973, the date of the auto-dissolving of the GP. By this point, however, Lévy had developed a very amicable relationship with Sartre, who decided to make him his protégé and asked him to serve as his personal secretary, which he remained from September 1974 till Sartre's death in 1980. Sartre interceded to President Valéry Giscard d'Estaing, and Lévy was naturalized.

== The thought of the Return ==
During these six years, Lévy worked with Sartre, and the two men produced four books until Sartre's death. While working with Sartre, Lévy began to discover Judaism, initially through his research into the Kabbalah, which he conducted with his mentor. Their work together created a stir among the circle that surrounded Sartre, because Sartre had begun introducing new ideas and terms that evoked religious and, more specifically, Jewish concepts, such as Redemption and Messianism. Some, including Simone de Beauvoir began accusing Lévy of brainwashing Sartre and faking his writings. After this Ms de Beauvoir and Mr Levy were no longer on speaking terms. Two months before his death, Sartre responded to these critics, claiming that he had indeed abandoned some of his earlier ideas. In 1978, Lévy encountered Levinas, and started learning Hebrew and beginning Talmudic studies.

Starting in 1975, he taught at the University of Paris-VII, founded in the wake of May 68, before obtaining a doctorate in philosophy at the Sorbonne in 1985, and a habilitation to direct researches (HDR) in philosophy in 1998, under the direction of Dominique Lecourt at Paris-VII.

Benny Lévy embraced Jewish Orthodoxy, and began to study in a yeshiva in Strasbourg. He finally immigrated to Israel in 1997, where he established the Institut d'études lévinassiennes in Jerusalem along with Bernard-Henri Lévy and Alain Finkielkraut, and learned with Rabbi Moshe Shapira. He died suddenly during the holiday of Sukkot in 2003. In Etre Juif, he wrote:

To be Jewish. To be, in an absolutely singular manner... a thought of the Return. The Return to the Sinaï... The thought of the Return (la pensée du Retour) requires a critique of the atheology of the modern jew. Theology of the silence of God after Auschwitz, critique of theodicy, finally return to the notion of absolute Evil, these are the points through which one must pass in a critical manner. In this sense, this book addresses itself at any man, insofar as he is still sensible to the question of the origin of evil.

== Bibliography ==
- Alain Finkielkraut, Benny Lévy, Le Livre et les Livres, essai sur la laïcité, Verdier, 2006.
- Jean-Paul Sartre & Benny Lévy, L'espoir maintenant : les entretiens de 1980, présentés et suivis du Mot de la fin par Benny Lévy, Publication : Paris : Verdier, 1991.
- Philon en regard des pharisiens de l'intériorité, Publication: Lille 3: ANRT, 1986 Description matérielle: 3 microfiches; 105x148 mm Note(s): Th. 3e cycle: Hist. de la philos.: Paris 1: 1985.
- Être Juif, Verdier, 2003.
- La confusion des temps, Verdier, 2004.
- La cérémonie de la naissance, Verdier, 2005.
- Le meurtre du pasteur: critique de la vision politique du monde, Paris: B. Grasset: Verdier, 2002.
- Hope now : the 1980 interviews. With Jean-Paul Sartre. Chicago : University of Chicago Press, 1996.
- Le Logos et la lettre: Philon d'Alexandrie en regard des pharisiens, Publication: Lagrasse: Verdier, 1988.
- Le Nom de l'homme : dialogue avec Sartre, Publication: Lagrasse: Verdier, 1984.
- On a raison de se révolter, sous le pseudonyme de Pierre Victor, avec Jean-Paul Sartre et Philippe Gavi, Gallimard, collection "La France sauvage", 1974.
- "Today's Hope: Conversations with Sartre". Telos 44 (Summer 1980). New York: Telos Press.
- Visage continu: la pensée du retour chez Emmanuel Lévinas, Publication: Lagrasse: Verdier, 1998.
