= Mao-spontex =

Libertarian Maoist ideology

Mao-spontex, also known as Maoist spontaneism, was a Maoist tendency of the French New Left which upheld spontaneous action as a revolutionary strategy. Drawing from Mao Zedong's concept of the mass line, Mao-spontex developed a libertarian approach to Mao's political thought following the suppression of the May 68 protests. Mao-spontex activists rejected hierarchy, dogmatism and the political party form, which they associated with orthodox Marxism-Leninism. Mao-spontex was mainly represented by two political organisations: the Proletarian Left (GP) and Vive la Révolution (VLR). The movement effectively dissolved following the murder of Pierre Overney, a Mao-spontex activist of the GP, in 1972.

== Background ==
=== Theoretical foundation ===
In What Is to Be Done?, Vladimir Lenin argued that, although the material conditions of the working class made them naturally more receptive to socialism, they would not spontaneously become socialists due to these conditions, and thus had to be politicised through their introduction to revolutionary theory. On the contrary, in Anarchism or Socialism?, Joseph Stalin argued that the development of class consciousness was necessarily determined by workers' material conditions, in a process described as "social spontaneism". Mao Zedong later developed on this social spontaneism, replacing Stalin's own economic determinism with a theory that placed the production of knowledge in the political sphere. Mao argued that, as revolutionary agents were liable to confuse their own advancement with that of the common good, any revolutionary vanguard would have to take its orders from and hold itself accountable to the masses. This theory of the mass line was particularly appealing to French revolutionaries, who had built on a decades-long history of anarcho-syndicalism, which advocated for workers' self-management. Maoism provided French radicals with a means to break from the bureaucracy of traditional socialist parties and the guilt associated with French colonialism. It also offered a new revolutionary tradition, drawing from the French Revolution and the Paris Commune, at a time when many socialists felt stifled by "real socialism".

=== French Maoism ===
During the period of De-Stalinization, the French Communist Party (PCF) experienced a split, with Marxist-Leninists forming the Marxist-Leninist Communist Party of France (PCMLF) and young Maoists breaking away from the Union of Communist Students (UEC) to establish the Marxist-Leninist Union of Communist Youth (UJCML). Mao's theory of the mass line influenced the UJCML to reject the political party structure of the PCMLF, believing it was inappropriate for the stage of the political struggle that they were in. While both groups experienced internal splits over this organisational issue, the events of May 68 broke out. The UJCML initially called on students to dismantle the barricades, as workers were not yet participating in the struggle, but after French trade unions joined the movement by carrying out strike actions and factory occupations, the UJCML also began participating. This caused the UJCML to collapse, with some advocating for a return to the political party structure, while others were drawn towards an anti-hierarchical Maoism. The latter upheld a fluid approach to organisation, rejected theoretical orthodoxy and advocated for a direct confrontation with capitalism. They even managed to appropriate the label of Maoism, while derisively referring to the hierarchical parties as "Marxist-Leninist". Leading figures of anti-hierarchical Maoism included Louis Althusser, Michel Foucault, Henri Lefebvre and, most notably, Jean-Paul Sartre.

== History ==
=== Emergence ===
During the events of May 68, two of the most influential New Left groups were the Situationist International (SI) and the Movement of 22 March (22M), which both upheld organisational spontaneity and advanced a critique of everyday life under capitalism. 22M was itself a coalition of Maoists, Trotskyism and anarchists, although the latter held the most influence through the group's leader Daniel Cohn-Bendit. Their ideology of "spontaneism" quickly gained an influence in the French New Left, eventually being taken up by Maoists who founded the Mao-Spontex tendency. "Spontex" was short for "spontaneist" and was derived from Spontex, a French cleaning sponge brand. This was in reference to the tendency's disposition to "absorb" ideas from different radical sources. It was originally conceived by other Marxists an insult towards members of the tendency, a way to mock them for their adoption of anti-authoritarianism, as orthodox Marxism traditionally criticised spontaneism for its anarchistic tendencies.

Mao-Spontex was a libertarian movement. Advocates of spontaneity rejected the political party form advocated by Leninists and Trotskyists. Young Maoists of the Mao-Spontex tendency rejected hierarchy, classism and elitism. In attempting to follow the mass line, they participated in class conflict, political demonstrations and self-criticism. The French Mao-spontex movement coincided with the development of the Maoist "splittist" tendency in the United Kingdom, and the Dada Maoism movement in Italy. Spontaneism was also taken up by other anti-authoritarian Maoists in West Germany, where they were known as Spontis. Members of the Mao-spontex current often clashed with the French police, as well as with members of the PCF and its affiliate trade union the General Confederation of Labour (CGT).

=== Organisation ===
In September 1968, a Mao-Spontex current broke away from the UJCML and established the Proletarian Left (French: Gauche prolétarienne; GP), a party which advocated for anti-hierarchical Maoism through its newspaper La Cause du Peuple. Initially a small group, in February 1969, the GP received an influx of new activists from the defunct 22M, as well as people that had not taken a side on the dispute between Mao-Spontex and the Marxist-Leninists. Jacques Kébadian and Joani Hocquenghem led a cell of the Revolutionary Communist Youth (JCR) which was expelled from the organisation for its Mao-Spontex tendencies. They later joined the GP.

LGBTQ rights activist Guy Hocquenghem also split from the JCR and aligned himself with the Mao-Spontex group Vive la Révolution (VLR). Activists of this group established the newspaper Tout !, conceived as a publication for the masses. It struck a balance between the Marxist and libertarian movements, publicised countercultural issues, and differentiated itself from the red and black publication styles of traditional Marxist newspapers by making frequent use of colours and illustrations. Through its Mao-spontex political philosophy, VLR was more open to being influenced by new and different ideological currents. It provided uncritical support to the Black Panther Party, translating many of their pamphlets into French and placing them at the centre of the international anti-capitalist movement.

=== Decline ===
Although Mao-Spontex helped to reinvigorate sections of French intellectualism, it also contributed to the further fragmentation of the French left. As a tendency, Mao-spontex began to decline during the early 1970s, having largely been unable to develop an influence over the industrial working-class. GP was banned by the French government in 1970, and VLR dissolved in 1971. According to some members of French New Left, the movement was brought to an end in 1972, when the labour movement failed to respond to the murder of Pierre Overney, a Mao-spontex activist of the GP, by a Renault security guard.

== Legacy ==
In the late 1970s, the revolutionary theory of Mao-spontex was developed further by the Italian anarchist Alfredo Bonanno. Bonanno's conception of insurrectionary anarchism drew from the libertarian elements of Maoism, which upheld a "vigorous people's movement" as opposed to a vanguard, and extended its critiques of vanguardism to all forms of organisation and leadership; Bonanno's idea of revolution involved decentralised and spontaneous action by a loose network of individuals.

== Bibliography ==
- Abidor, Mitchell (2018). May Made Me: An Oral History of the 1968 Uprising in France. AK Press. ISBN 9781849353106.
- Bourg, Julian (2017). "Violence and the Gauche prolétarienne". From Revolution to Ethics, Second Edition. McGill-Queen's University Press. pp. 51–60. doi:10.1515/9780773552463. ISBN 978-0-7735-5246-3.
- Boyer, Cyrus; Brenez, Nicole (2024). "Jacques Kebadian, From One Revolution to Another". Aniki: Revista Portuguesa da Imagem em Movimento. 11 (1): 204–223. doi:10.14591/aniki.v11n1.1019.
- Debouzy, Marianne (1973). "The Influence of American Political Dissent on the French New Left". In Den Hollander, Arie Nicolaas Jan (ed.). Contagious Conflict: The Impact of American Dissent on European Life. Brill. pp. 50–68. doi:10.1163/9789004621831_005. ISBN 9789004621831.
- Dutton, Michael; Healy, Paul (1985). "Marxist Theory and Socialist Transition: The Construction of an Epistemological Relation". In Brugger, Bill (ed.). Chinese Marxism in Flux, 1978-84: Essays on Epistemology, Ideology, and Political Economy. Routledge. doi:10.4324/9781315495170-2. ISBN 9781315495170.
- Fairfax, Daniel (2020). "Cahiers du cinéma's Maoist Turn and the Front Culturel Révolutionnaire". Zapruder World. 6. doi:10.21431/Z31S3F. Archived from the original on 2021-05-06.
- Fields, Belden (1984). "French Maoism". Social Text (9/10): 148–177. doi:10.2307/466540. ISSN 0164-2472. JSTOR 466540.
- Graber, Lauren; Spaulding, Daniel (2019). "The Red Flag: The art and politics of West German Maoism". In Galimberti, Jacopo; de Haro García, Noemi; Scott, Victoria H. F. (eds.). Art, Global Maoism and the Chinese Cultural Revolution. Manchester University Press. doi:10.7765/9781526117472.00011. ISBN 978-1-5261-1747-2. S2CID 209562552.
- Idier, Antoine (2018). "A Genealogy of a Politics of Subjectivity: Guy Hocquenghem, Homosexuality, and the Radical Left in Post- 1968 France". In Häberlen, Joachim C.; Keck-Szajbel, Mark; Mahoney, Kate (eds.). The Politics of Authenticity: Countercultures and Radical Movements across the Iron Curtain, 1968-1989. Berghahn Books. pp. 89–109. doi:10.1515/9781789200003-006.
- Lee, Joseph Tse-Hei; Nedilsky, Lida V. (2012). "Appeal and Discontent: The Yin and Yang of China's Rise to Power". In Lee, Joseph Tse-Hei; Nedilsky, Lida V.; Cheung, Siu-Keung (eds.). China's Rise to Power. Palgrave Macmillan. pp. 1–29. doi:10.1057/9781137276742_1.
- McGrogan, Manus (2010). "Vive La Révolution and the Example of Lotta Continua: The Circulation of Ideas and Practices Between the Left Militant Worlds of France and Italy Following May '68". Modern & Contemporary France. 18 (3): 309–328. doi:10.1080/09639489.2010.493931.
- McGrogan, Manus (2014). "Militants sans frontières? Fusions and frictions of US movements in Paris, 1970". Contemporary French Civilization. 39 (2). doi:10.3828/cfc.2014.12.
- Piotrowski, Grzegorz (2024). "Insurrectionary Anarchism in Poland: The Case of the People's Liberation Front". Anarchist Studies. 32 (2): 75–102. doi:10.3898/AS.32.2.04.
- Wise, David (2014). "The Late 1960s and King Mob". King Mob: A Critical Hidden History. Bread and Circuses Publishing. ISBN 9781625174031.
