= Murder of Pierre Overney =

French Maoist political activist (1948–1972)

Pierre Overney
- Born: Pierre Maxime Elie Overney; 27 April 1948; Montcornet, France
- Died: 25 February 1972 (aged 23); Boulogne-Billancourt, France
- Political party: Gauche prolétarienne

Pierre Maxime Elie Overney (French: [pjɛʁ ɔvɛʁnɛ]; 27 April 1948 – 25 February 1972) was a French worker and Maoist political activist. He was killed by a security guard.

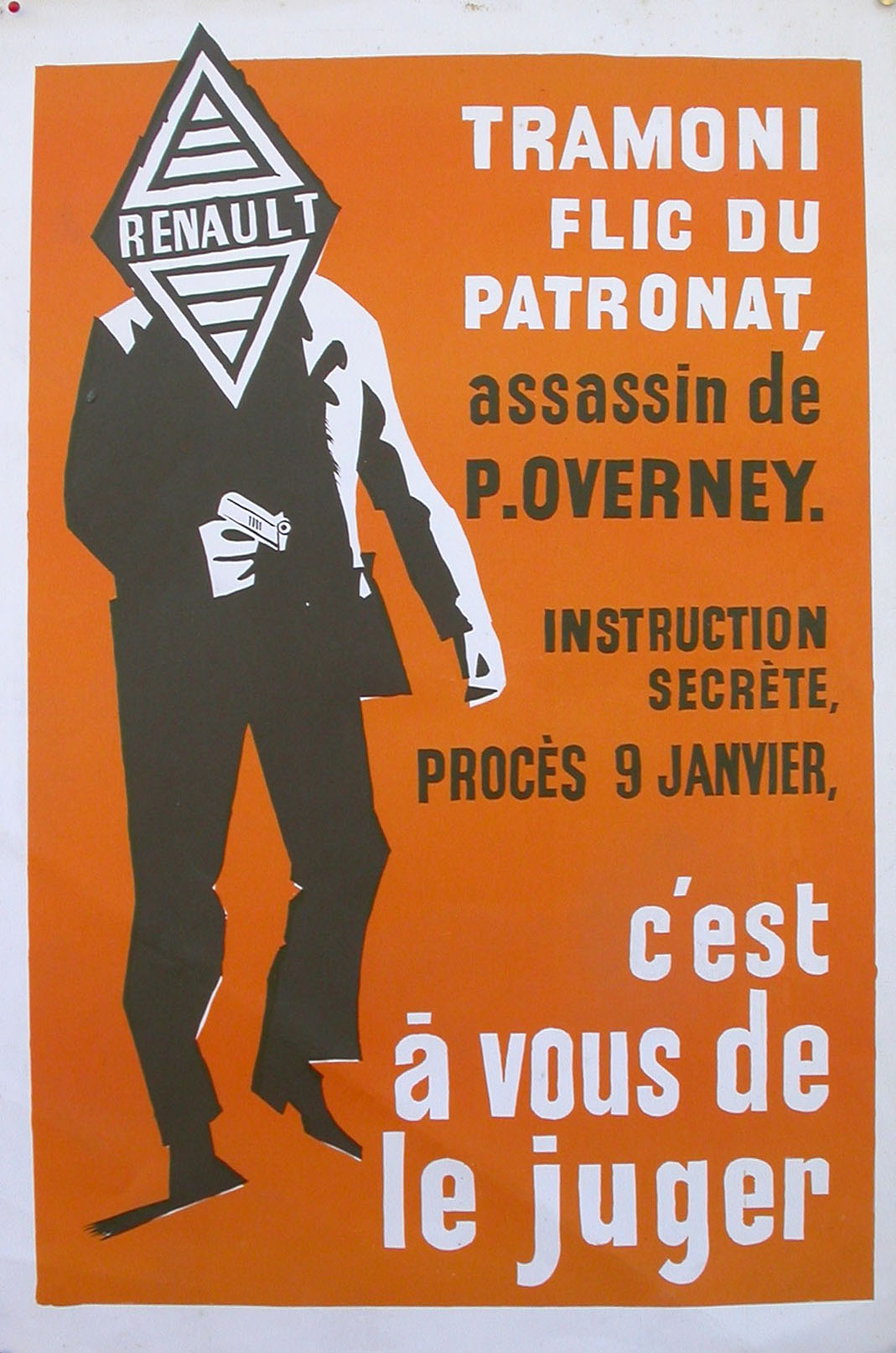
Poster by a Maoist group detailing the murder of Overney at the hands of a Renault security guard.

== Death ==
Pierre Overney was a worker in the Renault automobile factory. He was fired from his job. On Friday, 25 February 1972, Overney and other activists were distributing pamphlets to the workers as they entered and left the gates. Pierre got into a dispute with security guard Jean-Antoine Tramoni. The guard pulled a gun and shot Overney.

== Reactions ==
=== Armed actions ===
On 1 March 1972, in response to the murder, a group of activists set fire to the cars in the Renault depot.

On 8 March 1972, the Maoist organization Nouvelle résistance populaire kidnapped Robert Nogrette.

=== Funeral ===
200,000 attended Overney's funeral, including Jean-Paul Sartre and Michel Foucault.

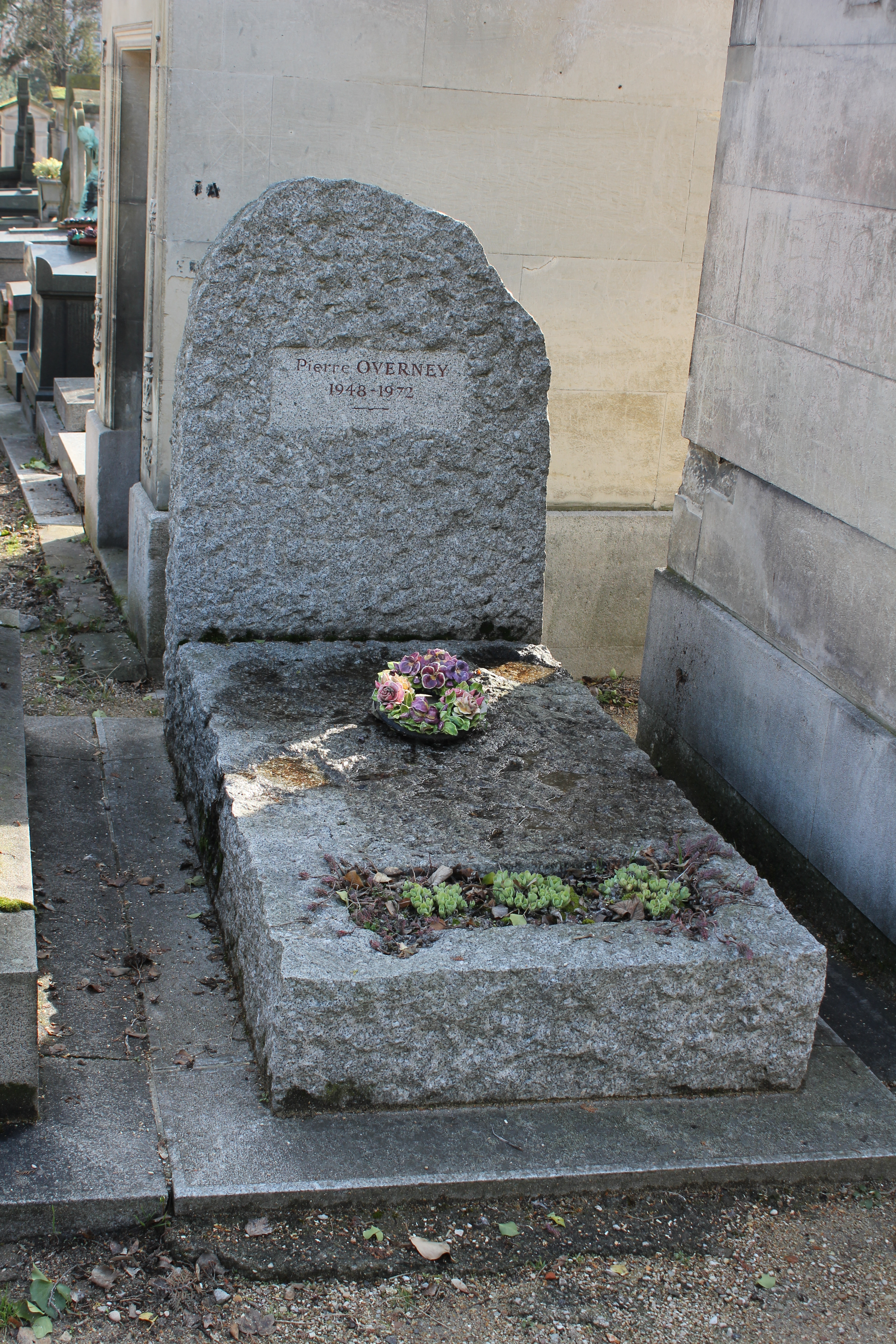
Pierre Overney's tombstone in Père Lachaise Cemetery, in Paris.

== Trial of Tramoni and action of the NAPAP ==
Tramoni's trial began in January 1973. The court sentenced him to four years in prison. Following his release from prison on 23 March 1977, Tramoni was killed by the Maoist group Armed Nuclei for Popular Autonomy.

== Commemoration in culture ==
French singer Dominique Grange dedicated a song named Pierrot est tombé to Pierre Overney.

== See also ==
- Mao-Spontex
- Gauche prolétarienne
