= Internationalist Revolutionary Action Groups =

Spanish anarchist militant group (1973–1979)

- Grupos de Acción Revolucionaria Internacionalista
- Leader: Jean-Marc Rouillan
- Dates active: 1973–1979
- Headquarters: Toulouse
- Active regions: Belgium, France, Spain
- Ideology: Anarchism; Occitan nationalism; Socialism
- Political position: Far-left
- Size: 11
- Part of: Spanish anarchist movement

The Internationalist Revolutionary Action Groups (French: Groupes d'action révolutionnaires internationalistes; Spanish: Grupos de Acción Revolucionaria Internacionalista; GARI) was a Spanish anarchist militant group which operated from Occitania against targets which it saw as collaborators of Francoist Spain. Established in 1973 by former members of the Iberian Liberation Movement (MIL), political repression in Spain had provoked them to take up armed struggle against the Francoist dictatorship. It attacked the Spanish consulate in Toulouse, kidnapped an executive of the Bank of Bilbao, and carried out bombings against organs of the Spanish tourism industry. After its leading members were arrested in 1974, its activities declined, but by 1976, they were released due to a legal technicality. After the Spanish transition to democracy, the GARI merged with a Maoist militant group and established Action Directe (AD), which became involved in increasingly more extreme acts of left-wing terrorism during the 1980s.

== Establishment ==
The Internationalist Revolutionary Action Groups (French: Groupes d'action révolutionnaires internationalistes; Spanish: Grupos de Acción Revolucionaria Internacionalista; GARI) was formed in the Occitan city of Toulouse by a group of Spanish anarchists, including the children of Republican refugees of the Spanish Civil War. Some of its members, such as its leader Jean-Marc Rouillan, had previously been part of the Iberian Liberation Movement (MIL), which had been suppressed by the Francoist dictatorship in 1973, following the arrest and execution of its leader Salvador Puig Antich. Antich's execution convinced them that they needed to build up an armed organisation and adopt the tactics of revolutionary violence. The group drew its ideological inspiration largely from anarchism, which it combined with elements of Occitan nationalism and the radical socialism of Jean Jaurès. It stated its goal to be the eventual elimination of all states and political power, although it focused its efforts on specifically attacking the Francoist dictatorship and its collaborators. It also aimed to support prisons of the MIL.

== Operations ==
The GARI went on to become one of the major armed groups of the New Left that operated during the 1970s in Europe. Over the course of the decade, it carried out a series of operations in France and Spain, including in the cities of Barcelona, Brussels, Paris and Toulouse. Its principal aim was to force the governments of Belgium and France to cease collaboration with the Francoist dictatorship. With old rifles left over from the civil war, they began carrying out attacks against companies and institutions which they saw as Francoist collaborators.

During its attacks, the GARI specifically avoided killing people. In early 1974, the group machine-gunned an empty car of the Spanish consulate in Toulouse; in a letter they sent to prime minister Carlos Arias Navarro, they declared "we have arms and are ready to use them." On 3 May 1974, the GARI kidnapped Balthazar Suarez, the director of the Bank of Bilbao, to raise awareness of political repression in Spain; they released him unharmed soon after. It also sabotaged Spanish infrastructure, damaging electricity pylons going across the France–Spain border, and especially targeted the Spanish tourism industry: the GARI disrupted the Tour de France by setting off bombs in the Hautes-Pyrénées; it carried out arson attacks against Spanish religious tourist buses on the pilgrimage route to Lorda and blew up Spanish tourist buses in Paris; and set off bombs in train stations along the border. During their bombing attacks, the explosions wounded 11 firemen and seriously wounded a bomb disposal expert. The group's activities were financed by bank robberies, which they carried out in Besièrs and Toulouse.

In September 1974, group members Michel Camillieri and Mario Innes were arrested during a traffic stop over a minor violation. In December, French police then arrested Jean-Marc Rouillan, Floréal Cuadrado and Raymond Delgado, which effectively dismantled the GARI. Its remaining members were Olivier Chibaud, Charles Grosmougin, Carlos Jauregui, Victor Manrique, Robert Touati and Dimitri Saintes. In 1975, the remnants of the GARI carried out an attack against the Palais de Justice in Paris. In March 1976, the State Security Court ruled that the GARI could not be prosecuted for terrorism as it had not threatened the authority of the French state, forcing the government to restart its investigation of the group. Through this legal technicality, the arrested GARI members were now being held without charge, which the GARI remnants protested by throwing molotov cocktails at the Spanish consulate and a cultural centre in Montpelhièr. Without a legal case against them, on 25 May 1977, the government released Camillieri, Innes and Rouillan.

== Dissolution ==
After the Spanish transition to democracy, in 1979, members of the GARI merged with members of the Maoist Armed Nuclei for Popular Autonomy (NAPAP) to establish Direct Action (AD). Its leader, Jean-Marc Rouillan, transposed his training in armed struggle against Francoism to a French context, leading to a surge in left-wing terrorism in France during the 1980s. While in prison, Rouillan's ideology had shifted towards Marxism-Leninism and he came to admire the left-wing terrorism of the period. In August 1979, former GARI members robbed a tax office, from which they stole 16 million francs. The AD initially carried out symbolic attacks, similar to those previously carried out by the GARI, but over time they became more violent and indiscriminate, leading to the decline of GARI influence over the AD. In response to the Second Israeli invasion of Lebanon in 1982, former GARI members Michel Camillieri, Olivier Chibaud and Charles Grosmougin planted a bomb assembled by the Lebanese Armed Revolutionary Factions (FARL) under an Israeli diplomatic vehicle and wounded 51 people in its detonation. Camilleri left AD that same year, reporting that, despite its new-found advocacy of Third Worldism, it had become isolated from popular movements and lost touch with the working class.

== Bibliography ==
- Dartnell, Michael (1990). "France's action directe: Terrorists in search of a revolution". Terrorism and Political Violence. 2 (4): 457–488. doi:10.1080/09546559008427077.
- Dartnell, Michael (1995). "The History of Action Directe: From Gauchisme to Nihilism". Action Directe: Ultra-Left Terrorism in France, 1979-1987. Frank Cass. pp. 73–96. ISBN 9780714645667. OCLC 31077544.
- Davies, Garth; Zdjelar, Vanja (2023). "The Evolution of Left-Wing Extremism in the West". In Zúquete, José Pedro (ed.). The Palgrave Handbook of Left-Wing Extremism. Vol. 1. Palgrave Macmillan. doi:10.1007/978-3-031-30897-0_2.
- Gildea, Robert; Jóhannesson, Gudni; Reynolds, Chris; Voglis, Polymeris (2013). "Violence". In Gildea, Robert; Mark, James; Warring, Anette (eds.). Europe's 1968: Voices of Revolt. Oxford University Press. pp. 258–282. ISBN 978-0-19-958751-3.
- Martín Álvarez, Alberto; Rey Tristán, Eduardo, eds. (2017). "Introduction". Revolutionary Violence and the New Left: Transational Perspectives. Routledge. pp. 1–23. ISBN 978-1-138-18441-1.
- Sánchez-Cuenca, Ignacio (2019). "The Long-Term Determinants of Revolutionary Terrorism". The Historical Roots of Political Violence: Revolutionary Terrorism in Affluent Countries. Cambridge Studies in Comparative Politics. Cambridge University Press. pp. 131–178. doi:10.1017/9781108697699.006. ISBN 9781108697699.
- Torres, Maggie (2019). Anarchism and Political Change in Spain: Schism, Polarisation and Reconstruction of the Confederación Nacional del Trabajo, 1939-1979. Sussex Academic Press. ISBN 9781845199364.
- Warnes, Richard (2012). "Action Directe (AD)". In Chalk, Peter (ed.). Encyclopedia of Terrorism. Bloomsbury Publishing. pp. 7–8. ISBN 9780313385353.
