= Jacques Canivet =

French scientific instrument maker

Jacques Canivet (1714-1773) was a French scientific instrument maker.

Parisian craftsman active in the second half of the eighteenth century. Nephew and successor of Claude Langlois (1690-1756), Canivet started his business from the workshops of Lordelle and Jean Chapotot in 1743 at Quai de l'Horloge du Palais à la Sphère Royale. He was Master of the Corporation des Fondeurs and became supplier of scientific instruments to the Académie Royale des Sciences in Paris and produced compasses, graphometers, astronomical quadrants, transit instruments, drawing instruments, and parallactic machines. Canivet was succeeded by Lennel.
