= Jean-Julien Chervier =

- Born: 14 July 1971 (age 54)
- Occupations: Writer and director
- Known for: La fonte des neiges

Jean-Julien Chervier (born 14 July 1971) is a French writer and director whose films often deal with themes of adolescence and sexuality.

== Biography ==
After studying Art Sciences at the Sorbonne, Jean-Julien Chervier produced a radio program devoted to the cinema on Aligre FM. He interviewed many directors, producers and distributors in the independent French cinema industry of the mid-1990s. These meetings gave birth to the first feature film on which he collaborated, Julie est amoureuse by Vincent Dietschy with Anne Le Ny and François Chattot. He then directed his first short film, La Prière de l’écolier (Schoolboy's prayer), which portrays the desire of a boy of eleven years. The film won the Prix Beaumarchais for best screenplay and was distributed in theaters with Corps Ouverts (Open Body) by Sébastien Lifshitz. At the same time, he was a player for Pierre Chevalier at the Arte, and a programmer at the Short Film Agency.

In the early 2000s, he co-wrote and co-directed with Agnès Obadia Du Poil sous les roses (Hair under the roses), an outspoken comedy about the awakening sexuality of two teenagers. The film introduced the young actors Julie Durand and Nicolas Duvauchelle. He then became a regular creator of scenarios, giving workshops on writing and directing, collaborating in writing stories and directing more short films. Among these are Le temps des cerises (The cherry season) with Bernard Haller and Thérèse Roussel, which obtained more praise for its interpretation. The film, which offers an alternative vision of desire and pleasure, far from the imagery of totally smooth skin, was released in 2006 on Canal+ and shown as part of Critics' Week.

In 2009, La Fonte des neiges (Thawing out) is about a few days of a holiday when a twelve-year-old child is forced to follow his mother to a nudist camp. At first deeply shy, he responds by wearing extra clothes. After meeting a girl he slowly becomes more relaxed and is revealed as a responsible and gentle person. The film deals carefully with a subject that could be controversial, and was aired on French national television (Arte). It was chosen at international festivals such as Brooklyn, Lisbon, Ebensee and Clermont-Ferrand.

== Films ==
Year	Title	Role	Notes
1997	Julie est amoureuse	Co-writer	Directed by Vincent Dietschy, starring Marie Vialle, Aladin Reibel and Anne Le Ny
1997	La Prière de l'écolier	Director	Starring Julien Mouel
2000	Du poil sous les roses	Co-director	Co-directed with Agnès Obadia. Starring Julie Durand, Alexis Roucout, Alice Houri, Jean-Baptiste Pénigault, Nicolas Duvauchelle
2005	Le Temps des cerises	Director	Starring Bernard Haller, Thérèse Roussel
2008	La Fonte des neiges	Director	27 Minutes. Starring Marc Beffa, Géraldine Martineau, Zazon Castro, Laurent Roth, Natanaël Sylard
