= Salvador Puig Antich =

Spanish militant anarchist (1948–1974)

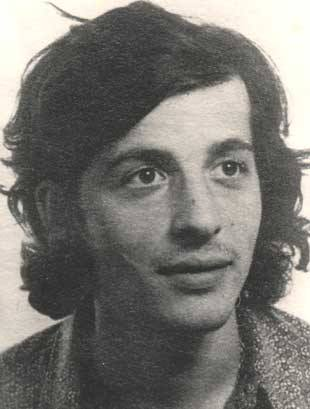
- Undated photo of Salvador Puig Antich
- Born: 30 May 1948; Barcelona, Spain
- Died: 2 March 1974 (aged 25); Barcelona, Spain
- Cause of death: Execution by garrote
- Conviction: Murder
- Penalty: Death

Salvador Puig Antich (Catalan pronunciation: [səlβəˈðo ˌpudʒ‿ənˈtik]; 30 May 1948 – 2 March 1974) was a Spanish militant anarchist from Catalonia. His execution for involvement in a bank robbery and shooting a police officer dead became a cause célèbre in Francoist Spain for Catalan autonomists, pro-independence supporters, and anarchists. After fighting the Spanish state with the militant organization Iberian Liberation Movement in the early 1970s, he was convicted and executed by garrote for the death of a police officer during a shoot-out.

Far left-wing Catalans viewed Puig Antich's judicial death as symbolic retribution for the region's fight for self-government, and his name became commonplace in Barcelona. The incident inspired works by Catalan artists Joan Miró and Antoni Tàpies, and a satirical play by the Catalan theater group Els Joglars. The 2006 film Salvador depicts Puig Antich's time on death row. After the Spanish Supreme Court declined an effort to review the execution, an Argentine court adopted the case under universal jurisdiction in 2013. His death sentence was nullified by the Ministry of Territorial Policy and Democratic Memory in 2025.

== Iberian Liberation Movement ==
Salvador Puig Antich was born 30 May 1948, in Barcelona, Spain. He was a member of the Workers' Commissions before he joined the Iberian Liberation Movement (Movimiento Ibérico de Liberación, or MIL). The group organized armed robberies against banks, which they called "expropriations", allegedly to fund their actions against Francoist Spain in 1972 and 1973. Puig Antich was meanwhile in London: Albert Melzer recalls him being "among the circle of anarchist activists who gathered in London around Miguel García García in the early days of the Centro Iberico" (Camden Town). He returned to Spain in September 1973.

After a series of these robberies, he was arrested for the death of police inspector Francisco Anguas during a shootout in the Calle Gerona, Barcelona. A military court sentenced him to death by garrote vil in the Model prison. His execution in March 1974 proceeded despite international outcry, as Spain's second state execution in eight years. University students in Barcelona and Madrid went on strike in protest of the execution, whereupon they fought with police.

== The execution of Georg Michael Welzel (Heinz Ches) ==
The same day, Georg Michael Welzel, from Cottbus (then GDR), was executed in Tarragona, charged for having killed a policeman. He was known as Heinz Ches because he declared it was his name and to be Polish, from Szczecin. The execution of Georg Michael Welzel, a common criminal, was seen as an intent of the Francoist regime to downplay the importance of the execution of a political activist like Puig Antich.

== Legacy ==
Some Catalans interpreted Puig Antich's execution as symbolic retaliation for the region's fight for autonomy, which led to public demonstrations. As one of the last convicted revolutionaries executed by Franco, Puig Antich became a household name in Barcelona. The Internationalist Revolutionary Action Groups (GARI) formed to avenge his death.

María Asunción Milá began her anti-death-penalty advocacy as a result of his execution. This culminated in a ban on the death penalty in the Spanish constitution and later a papal rule forbidding the death penalty.

Several years after his 1974 execution, the Catalan performance group Els Joglars performed La torna, a 1977 satire against torture based on the execution of Puig Antich and Heinz Ches. Even though Francoist Spain had ended, along with its censorship laws, members of Els Joglars were jailed or forced into exile. Spanish theater groups protested across Spain. Catalan painters Joan Miró and Antoni Tàpies both alluded to Puig Antich's execution in their mid-1970s work. Miró's The Hope of a Condemned Man triptych features a line that "sighs and falls with faltering resignation" and flicked paint. Tàpies's Assassins lithograph series, presented at the Parisian Galerie Maeght, too was inspired by Puig Antich's execution and Spanish politics. The 2006 film Salvador depicts Puig Antich's time spent on death row.

An effort by family members and outside groups to review Puig Antich's case was rejected by the Spanish Supreme Court in 2007, but an Argentinian judge adopted the case along with several others under universal jurisdiction in 2013. In February 2025, the Ministry of Territorial Policy and Democratic Memory under Ángel Víctor Torres declared the trial of Puig Antich to have been "illegal and illegitimate" and motivated by "political, ideological, conscience, or religious belief reasons, convictions or sanctions of a personal nature," and formally certified the nullification of his death sentence. Earlier, on 16 October 2024, Torres conducted a ceremony wherein he presented Puig Antich's surviving sisters with a certificate calling for "recognition and reparation" of Puig Antich's status as "a victim of the Francoist regime," and the Spanish government overturned Puig Antich's death sentence. In his statement at the ceremony, Torres acknowledged that the overturned death sentence was a gesture of "reparation, justice, and truth," and said, "Salvador was a victim and so was his family. This gesture puts things in the right place. Wherever he is, he will know that today, in a certain way, justice has been done." The gestures nullifying Puig Antich's death sentence did not mention his terrorism charges, the death of the police officer, or the judicial process leading to his execution; additionally, the document delivered to Puig Antich's sisters in October 2024 featured several errors, whereas the document filed in February 2025 to formally nullify Puig Antich's death sentence rectified the irregularities.

Puig Antich is interred in the Montjuïc Cemetery in Barcelona.

== See also ==
- Margalida Bover
