= Margalida Bover =

Mallorcan feminist and environmentalist

Margalida Bover i Vadell
- Born: 1953 (age 71–72); Felanitx, Mallorca, Balearic Islands, Spain
- Occupation: Activist
- Partner: Salvador Puig i Antich (1973–1974)

Margalida Bover i Vadell (Felanitx, 1953) is a Mallorcan feminist and environmentalist, known for being the last partner of Salvador Puig i Antich, the last Catalan to be executed by Francoist Spain. Joan Isaac dedicated the song A Margalida to her in 1976.

== Biography ==
Margalida was the second of eight sisters and four brothers. Before the age of seventeen, she left home and went to live in a commune in Ibiza. After a few years, she went to live in Mataró. Puig Antich and Margalida Bover met at the beginning of 1973, and he was executed in March 1974, after five months of confinement in the Model prison in Barcelona. Margalida went to live in the Canary Islands, returning for a short time to Barcelona before finally returning to live in Mallorca. She did not publicly reappear until thirty years later, when the journalists Constança Amengual and Francesca Mas premiered, on 27 July 2022 at the Sala Rívoli in Palma, a documentary that told her story, as part of the Mallorca Atlàntida Film Fest.
