= Jacques Sauvageot =

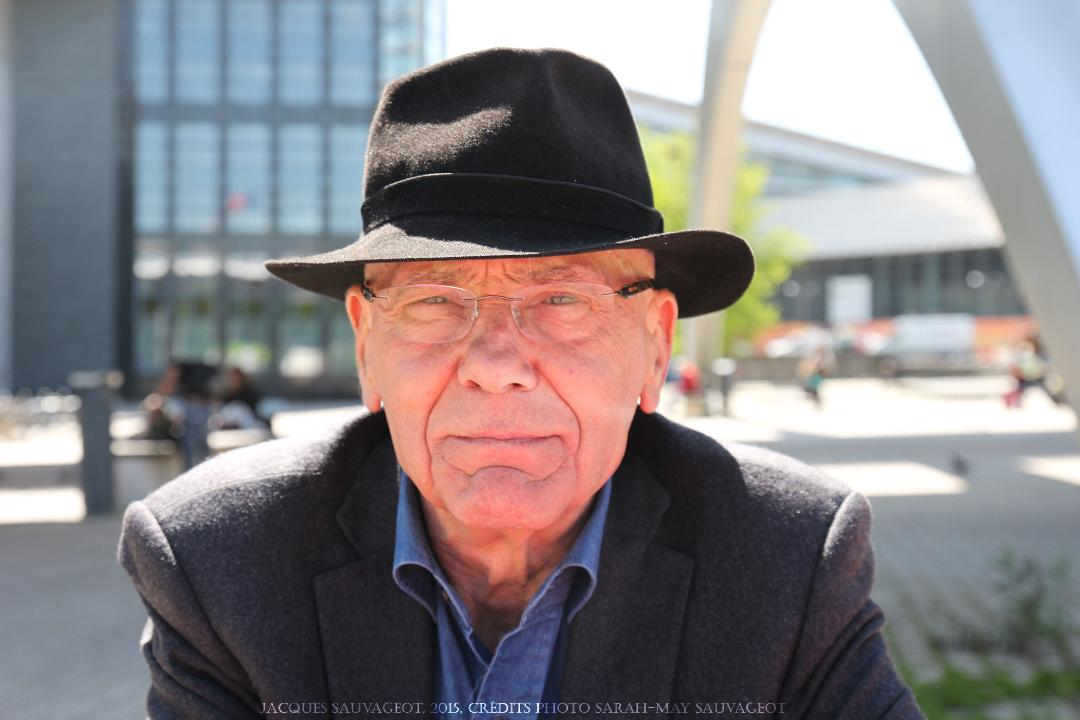

Jacques Sauvageot (16 April 1943 in Dijon – 28 October 2017 in Paris) was a French politician and art historian.

He was, along with Alain Geismar and Daniel Cohn-Bendit, was one of the spokespersons for the period of May 68, the name given to all the revolt movements that occurred in France during May–June 1968. He was later vice-president of the National Union of students of France (UNEF). He was elected president in December 1968 and chaired it until May 1969.

== Biography ==
In May 1968, twenty-five year old Sauvageot was an active student union activist. He had already graduated with degrees in law and art history in Dijon. He was a member of the student branch of the Unified Socialist Party (PSU), and vice-president of UNEF, de facto exercising the role of president without having the title. In July 1967, he participated with Alain Krivine in an internship organized by students from the new University of Nanterre in the rural site of the Lycée Saint-Joseph de Bressuire in Deux-Sèvres.

On 27 April 1968 he held a press conference and said that the UNEF refused to give an order to boycott the exams.

The UNEF subsequently played a leading role in the junction of the labor and student movements during the great demonstration of 13 May 1968, and on 27 May during the rally at Charléty stadium of the non-communist protestor left.

On 3 May he was arrested, among several hundred students, during the first night of revolt in the Latin Quarter. His notoriety grew rapidly, and he therefore played, notably with Alain Geismar and Daniel Cohn-Bendit, an important role in the expression of demands and the organization of the movement. On 13 May he was, along with the other union leaders, at the head of the Parisian demonstration which brought together several hundred thousand people.

In July, the UNEF made a first assessment of the events and wondered about the continuation of the movement. In December of the same year 1968, during the Marseille congress, the student organization, although divided between several tendencies, elected Jacques Sauvageot as its president.

In 1971, he was outvoted and left the union. He then militated in the PSU, more precisely in the Workers' and Peasant Left, a tendency of the PSU which broke away from this party in 1973 to merge with other small organizations within the Communist Organization of Workers. In 1976, he abandoned this activism which he described as "a small group of more".

He did his military service at Solenzara Air Base, then, being refused all the jobs to which he applied, became a specialized worker.

In 1973, he replied to a newspaper which had stated that he refused all the positions offered: "I have never yet had the possibility of refusing any position whatsoever: the many requests I have made in the education as in the public service or in the private sector have always met with a refusal." He then specifies that the only job he has found is carrying out, as a temporary worker, surveys on breeding in agriculture.

Following a competition, he entered the School of Fine Arts in Nantes as a professor of art history.

From 1983 to October 2009, he was director of the regional school of fine arts in Rennes. Between 2006 and 2009, he was president of the National Association of Higher Art Schools. He is also a member of the Socialist Tribune Institute which manages the PSU archives. It now bears his name. He is the author or co-author of several books on the art and ideas inherited from May 1968. In 2013, he led the publication of The PSU: Ideas for a socialism of the 21st century? (Rennes University Press). He occasionally collaborated with the Gabriel-Péri Foundation.

He then participated in April 2010 in the commemoration of the fiftieth anniversary of the creation of the Unified Socialist Party (PSU, ), the first step in the creation of the Socialist Tribune Institute, responsible for maintaining the intellectual heritage inherited from the PSU.

Jacques Sauvageot died on 28 October 2017 at the Pitié-Salpêtrière Hospital, following a traffic accident on 12 September.

A tribute was paid to him on Thursday 16 November 2017 at the Père-Lachaise funeral home by his parents and friends. The lawyer Henri Leclerc eulogized him.

== Works ==
- May–June 1968, action guidelines. Brochure reserved for workers and students, foreword by Jacques Sauvageot, Paris, Au joli mai, 1968
- The Student Revolt, the leaders speak, J. Sauvageot, A. Geismar, D. Cohn-Bendit; presentation of Hervé Bourges, Paris, Éd. du Seuil, 1968
- Association Presse information jeunesse, La Presse à l'école, postface by Jacques Sauvageot, Paris, Éditions du Cerf, 1974
- Monumental architecture and reconstruction, proceedings of the Rennes conference, December 1994, director of the publication Jacques Sauvageot, Rennes, Regional School of Fine Arts, 1995
- Art schools in Europe, seminar on art education in Europe, introduction by Martial Gabillard and Jacques Sauvageot, Rennes, Regional School of Fine Arts, 2004
- Carte blanche to Galerie Serge Le Borgne, catalog by François Perrodin, responsible for publication: Jacques Sauvageot, Rennes, École des beaux-arts, 2008
- From built space to printed space, proceedings of the Rennes study day, November 2008, under the direction of Jacques Sauvageot, Rennes, School of Fine Arts, 2009
- At the heart of the struggles of the sixties: PSU students: a utopia with a future?, work coordinated by Roger Barralis and Jean-Claude Gillet; introduction by Jacques Sauvageot, Paris, Publisud, 2010
- The PSU: Ideas for a socialism of the XXI th century?, work edited by Jacques Sauvageot, ed. Rennes University Press, 2013 ( ISBN 978-2753521834 )
- "L'UNEF et les frondes students", documentary film by Jean-Michel Rodrigo & Georges Terrier, directed by Jean-Michel Rodrigo. Co-production Mecanos Productions, INA, Telessonne, Atom, 2011.
