= André Senik =

French philosopher and communist activist

André Senik (born 1938), is a French associate professor of philosophy and former communist activist.

== Biography ==
Senik was born to Polish Jewish parents in the Sentier neighbourhood of Paris in 1938. He later joined a number of political groups, including MAPAM, the Union of Republican Youth of France, and the Union of Communist Students (UEC). He studied philosophy at the Parisian lycée in Janson-de-Sailly, where he met Jean-Marc Lévy-Leblond. He was also editor-in-chief of Clarté, the press organ of the UEC.

In May 1968 he was appointed professor of philosophy at the Lycée Henri-Bergson in Paris, where he participated in protests and supported revolts by high school students against the constraints of the school system. He was sanctioned by Minister Olivier Guichard and suspended for one year in 1969. Pierre Kahn and Alain Forner, the last two general secretaries of the UEC, and twenty-one colleagues appealed for his reinstatement.

After gradually withdrawing from communism, he adopted anti-communist positions. In the 2000s he was part of the Cercle de l'Oratoire, a pro-American think tank. He published The Communist Manifesto in the Eyes of History in 2015. It argues that the text by Marx and Engels carries the seeds of the totalitarianism of the 20th century.

== Works ==
- The Manifesto of the Communist Party in the Eyes of History, Éditions Pierre-Guillaume de Roux, 2015.
- Marx, Jews and Human Rights, Editions Denoël, 2011

== Bibliography ==
- Hervé Hamon et Patrick Rotman, Génération. 1. Les années de rêve, Paris, Le Seuil, 1987 ISBN 2-02-009549-1.
