= Rafael Corrales Valverde =

Spanish trade unionist (b. 1957)

Rafael Corrales
- Corrales, 2005

General Secretary of the Confederación Nacional del Trabajo
- In office 9 July 2005 – 21 July 2007
- Preceded by: Iñaki Gil
- Succeeded by: Fidel Manrique

Personal details
- Born: Rafael Corrales Valverde; 1957 (age 68–69)
- Profession: Construction worker

Rafael Corrales Valverde (born 1957) is a Spanish trade union leader. A construction worker by trade, in 2005, he became the General Secretary of the Confederación Nacional del Trabajo (CNT). During his tenure, he secured the compensation of the CNT for the properties seized from it during the Spanish Civil War, negotiated the return of parts of the CNT archives and oversaw an industrial dispute with Mercadona.

== Biography ==
Rafael Corrales Valverde was born in 1957. As a construction worker by profession, during the 1970s, he joined the Confederación Nacional del Trabajo (CNT), an anarcho-syndicalist trade union centre, while it was still operating as an illegal organisation under the Francoist dictatorship. He worked for the CNT construction unions in Madrid and later Seville, before changing careers and moving into a job with the Andalusian Health Service. On 9 July 2005, at a national plenary of the CNT, Rafael Corrales was elected General Secretary of the Confederación Nacional del Trabajo (CNT) for a 2-year term. He took over from Iñaki Gil.

In November 2005, Corrales began a series of meetings with the Ministry of Culture, during which he demanded €90 million from the Spanish government, in compensation for assets seized from the CNT during the Spanish Civil War, and that all property previously owned by the CNT be given back. Although Corrales handed over 40,000 pages of documents to the Ministry of Labour, showing 3,000 bank accounts and 1,600 properties seized from the union, the CNT was ultimately compensated €3.7 million. Corrales complained that the figures he had provided "far exceeded" the government's own estimation.

During this period, Corrales also wrote to Minister Carmen Calvo requesting that the CNT's documentary archives, distributed throughout the Spanish state's archives, be returned to its possession. Some of the documents had been deposited in the Civil War Archive in Salamanca and were marked for transfer to the Generalitat de Catalunya, in a move which Corrales called to be halted, fearing the further breakup and damaging of their archival records. Corrales managed to secure the transfer of the archives at the University of Alcalá, held by the Pablo Iglesias Foundation, back to the CNT.

On 23 March 2006, the dismissal of three workers at the Mercadona logistics centre in Sant Sadurní d'Anoia led to the outbreak of a months-long industrial dispute between the CNT and the supermarket chain. After 100 days of strike actions, Corrales travelled to Catalonia to meet with the striking workers and speak in support of them at a political demonstration in Barcelona. In August 2006, Corrales met with Mercadona executives to settle an agreement, aiming to improve working conditions at the company. After the negotiations, Mercadona dropped their pre-agreement with the CNT and attempted to "buy" the dismissal of the workers for €300,000, which Corrales rejected, calling for further demonstrations against the company.

On 26 November 2006, Corrales presided over the inauguration of a new CNT branch office in Córdoba.

On 21 July 2007, Corrales ended his term as general secretary and handed the post over to Fidel Manrique.

Preceded by Iñaki Gil	General Secretary of the CNT; 2005 – 2007	Succeeded by Fidel Manrique
