= Roger-Pol Droit =

French philosopher (born 1949)

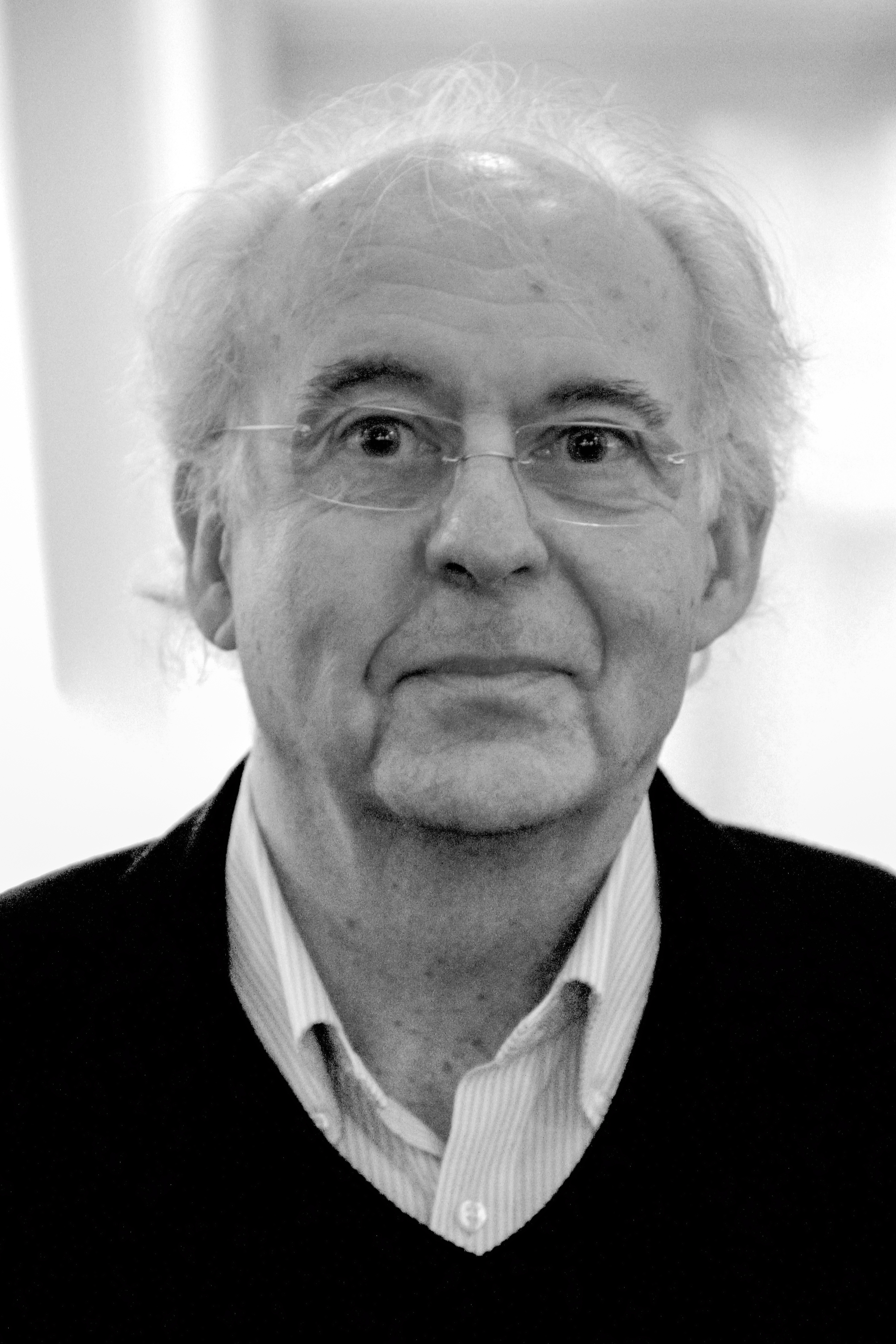

Roger-Pol Droit (born 1949) is a French academic and philosopher.
