= Claude Langlois =

French scientific instrument maker

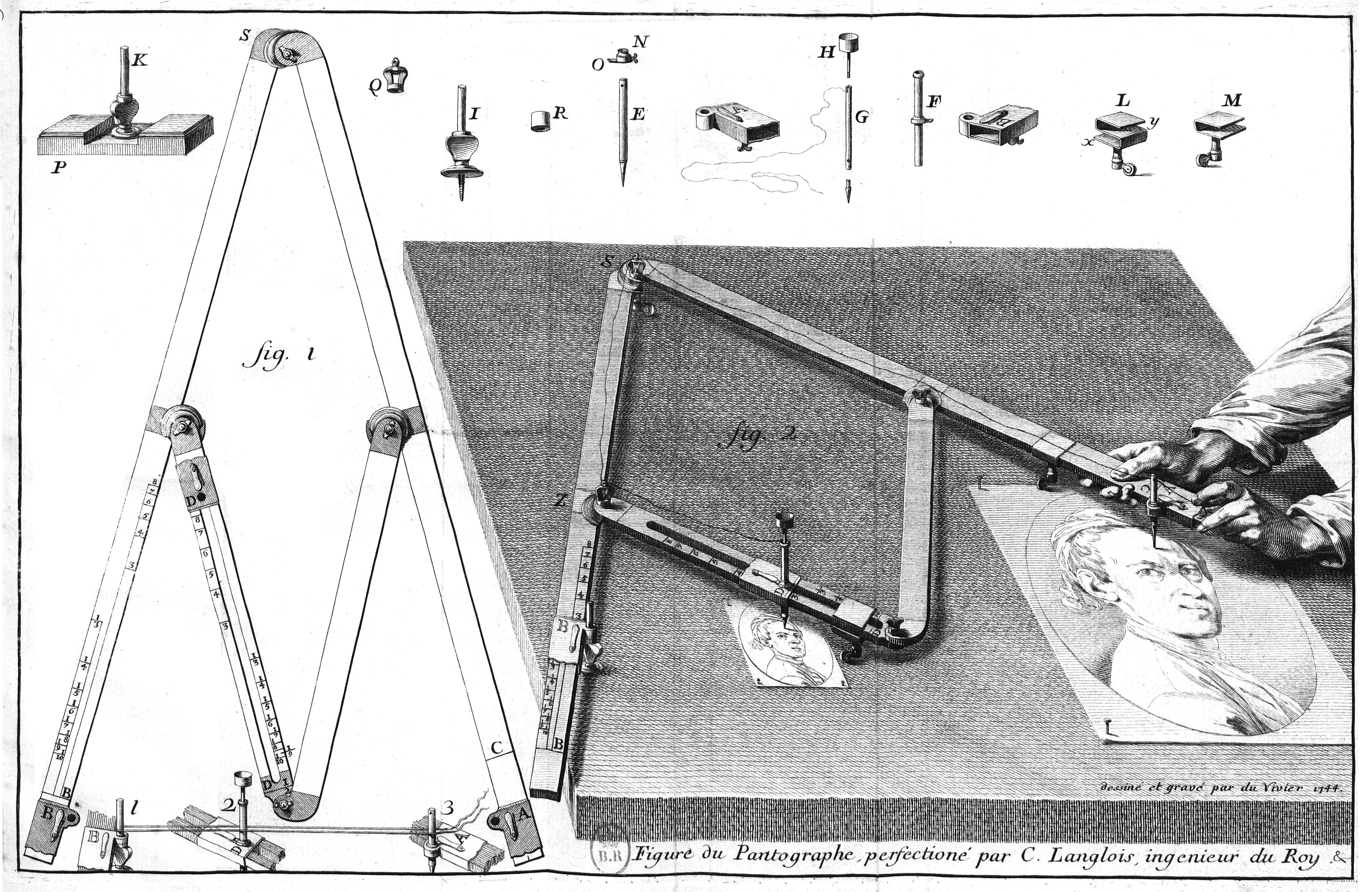
Langlois' pantograph design (1744)

Claude Langlois (c. 1700 – 1756) was a French maker of precision scientific instruments and the foremost among them in the period. His instruments included draughtsman's tools like an improved pantograph, measuring instruments, and six-foot quadrants for astronomical angle measurement. He was appointed official instrument maker for French astronomers Cassini II, Cassini de Thury, Le Monnier, Maupertuis, and the Abbé de Lacaille; and held the official position of ingénieur en instruments de mathématiques for the French Académie des Sciences in 1740.

Little is known of Langlois' life but he was considered the most famous maker of scientific instruments between 1730 and 1756 and many of his instruments are known from his name on them. This was a period when English instrument makers were leading with master instrument makers like Nicolas Bion and Michael Butterfield. Langlois' earliest known contract was for a six-foot wall quadrant for the Paris observatory with markings that indicate that he worked at the Niveau on the Quai de l'Horloge. He also produced instruments for use in labs (including those of Lavosier), by surveyors, navigators and astronomers. His improved pantograph design was sent to the Académie des Sciences for approval. His instruments were sent on geodesic expeditions to Peru and Lapland in 1733-35 which included measuring standards for the toise (the length standard then in use). In 1744 he was in charge of restoring a gnomon at the Church of St Sulpice, Paris. After his death, his nephew Jacques Canivet produced eighty copies of the Toise. His position at the Academy was taken by a pupil of his, Lennel.
