= Zazon =

French filmmaker and actress (born 1976)

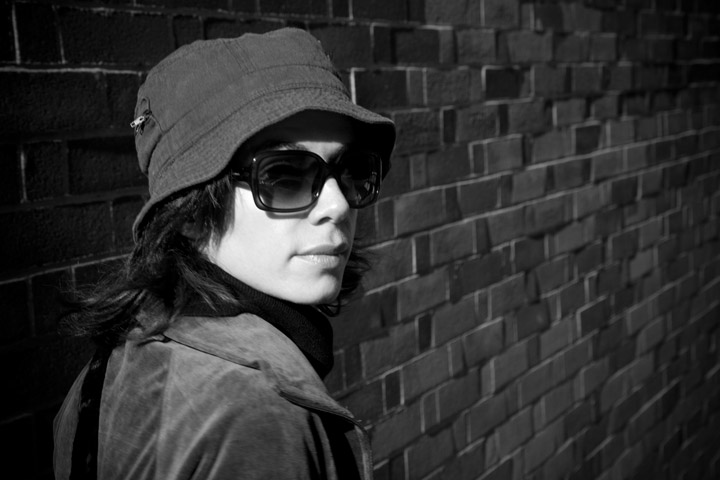
- In San Francisco, December 2006
- Born: 12 October 1976 (age 49); Paris
- Occupations: Actress, filmmaker
- Website: www.zazon.fr

Zazon (born Élisabeth Castro; 12 October 1976) is a French filmmaker and actress. She is the daughter of architect Roland Castro.

== Biography ==
Elizabeth Castro was born in Paris on 12 October 1976, while her parents were living on the rue Saint-Honoré. Her father, the architect Roland Castro, had been a radical student activist at the École nationale supérieure des Beaux-Arts during the protests of 1968. Her mother was a revolutionary feminist. She embarked on an artistic career, taking courses in acting and comedy, and obtaining a Master in Cinematography and Audiovisual Arts in France.

From 2001 to 2002, she lived in Los Angeles, where she worked as a waitress and became the fiancée of a producer of Hollywood blockbusters. However, he broke off the engagement when he found out about her father's politics. She returned to France and began her acting career, at first producing her own videos for the web. She made her first short film À la pêche aux poules (fishing for chickens) in 2002, followed by Summertime in collaboration with Fanny Glissant. She first created the character Zazon in 2003. In 2004, she appeared in Nous ne sommes pas des anges (We are not angels) on Canal+. In 2006, she appeared on France 3 in C'est bon pour le moral (It's good for morale). She and Peter Cattan founded Otoko films and produced the series Are you Buddha.

She became known for wacky skits, videos and improvisations, playing characters such as Zazon in the subway, the disruptive Toutaz (France 4 from January 2007) and the hysterical eco Miss Green (France 4 2008). In some episodes she plays the false innocent, where the reactions of passers-by are captured by a hidden camera. In others she acts out family neuroses. She was naked in La fonte des neiges where she played a nudist. From February to May 2012, she appeared in the one-woman show Sous les pavés… les pavés at l'Espace Saint-Honoré in Paris. The show gives a humorous account of her upbringing by a leader of the upheavals of 1968.

== Main characters and interpretations ==
- À la pêche aux poules, short, self-produced, 2001.
- Summertime, short co-produced with Fanny Glissant, 2002.
- Version Zazon, series of sketches and incidents, self-produced, 2003.
- Nous ne sommes pas des anges, 37 TV sketches, Canal+, Angel Production, 2004.
- C'est bon pour le moral, ten TV sketches, France 3, Ibach télévision, 2006.
- La lifecam de Zazon, short for the Internet, Otoko films, 2006.
- Are you Bouddah ?, short, 26 episodes, Otoko films, broadcast on France 4, 2008.
- Miss Green, short, 20 episodes, Otoko films, broadcast on France 4, 2008.
- Zazon cherche un garçon, short, Zazon, June TV, Otoko films.

== Acting parts ==
- 2009: La fonte des neiges, short, directed by Jean-Julien Chervier
- La journée de ouf, short, France 2, Martange production.
- La crim, Television film by Denis Amar.
- Diams, film by Keja Kramer.
- Que les feux roues s'éteignent, film by Céline Fossati.
- À la folie, pas du tout, film by Chantal Briet.
- Rien dans les poches, Marion Vernoux, Canal plus.
- 2009: La Grande Vie by Emmanuel Salinger
- Les quarante frères, feature film by Rachid Djaïdani.
- 2010: La Fête des voisins by David Haddad

== Writer ==
- Zzz, feature film.
- La remplaçante, short, co-written with Bilco, Otoko films.
- Web love, short, Otoko films.
- Bip, feature film supported by the Fondation Beaumarchais.
- Fantasy, film co-written with Julie Grelley.
- La tragique histoire d'Oswald et Precious, short.

== Theater ==
- JZ Experience
- Sous les pavés, les pavés
