= Guy Lardreau =

Guy Lardreau (28 March 1947 - 6 July 2008) was a French philosopher.

Lardreau is the youngest of four children. His father and mother are both teachers. In April 1971, he married Nicole Péaud-Lenoël, with whom he had a son, Jacques. In December 1994, he became the husband of Esther Cotelle.

He completed his secondary studies at the Lycée Charlemagne in Paris. In 1964, he received first prize in philosophy in the Concours général, and entered the Lycée Louis-le-Grand, where he prepared for the rue d'Ulm competition. His philosophy teachers were René Schérer, in hypokhâgne, and Louis Guillermit, in khâgne. It was in hypokhâgne that he met Michel Guérin, with whom he became lifelong friends.

In 1966, he published his first novel, Les Cheveux d'Epsilon, in the Mercure de France, in the L'Initiale collection. Until the end of April 1968, he was active within the Leo Frankel cell of Louis-le-Grand, in the Union of Marxist-Leninist Communist Youth (UJCml). In May 1968, he organized, with other activists, demonstrations in the suburbs, and during the following month, he campaigned within the Movement in Support of the People's Struggles (MSLP). In September 1968, he participated in the small founding group of the Proletarian Left; he first contributed, with Christian Jambet, to rallying the high school sector of the UJCml, then campaigned at the Goutte d'Or, and became editor-in-chief of the newspaper La Cause du peuple (successively directed by Jean-Pierre Le Dantec, Michel Le Bris, and by Jean-Paul Sartre), until the merger of La Cause du peuple and J'accuse in 1971 when, at about the same time as Jean-Claude Milner, he left the proletarian left.

== Publications ==
- 1966: Les Cheveux d'Epsilon, roman, Mercure de France, (coll. L'Initiale)
- 1973: Le Singe d’or. Essai sur le concept d’étape du marxisme, précédée d'une lettre-préface de François Châtelet, Mercure de France
- 1976: Ontologie de la révolution I, L'Ange : Pour une cynégétique du semblant, en collaboration avec Christian Jambet, Grasset, (coll. Figures)
- 1978: La Mort de Joseph Staline. Bouffonnerie philosophique, théâtre, Grasset, (coll. Figures)
- 1978: Ontologie de la révolution II, Le Monde : Réponse à la question : qu’est-ce que les droits de l'homme ?, en collaboration avec Christian Jambet, Grasset, (coll. Figures)
- 1980: Dialogues. Georges Duby–Guy Lardreau, Flammarion, (coll. Dialogues)
- 1985: Discours philosophique et discours spirituel. Autour de la philosophie spirituelle de Philoxène de Mabboug, Seuil, (coll. L'ordre philosophique), rééd. Le Centurion, 2018
- 1988: Fictions philosophiques et science-fiction. Récréation philosophique, Actes Sud, (coll. Le Génie du Philosophe), prix Maujean de l’Académie française en 1989
- 1989: «La Philosophie de Porphyre et la question de l’interprétation. Étude préliminaire », dans Porphyre. L’Antre des Nymphes, Verdier ISBN 2-86432-087-8
- 1993: La Véracité. Essai d’une philosophie négative, Verdier ISBN 2-86432-163-7
- 1997: Présentation criminelle de quelques concepts majeurs de la philosophie. Fantaisie pédagogique, Actes Sud, (coll. Le Génie du Philosophe)
- 1999: L’Exercice différé de la philosophie. À l’occasion de Deleuze, Verdier ISBN 2-86432-310-9
- 2001: Vive le matérialisme!, Verdier ISBN 2-86432-349-4
- 2013: Dialogues avec Georges Duby, Les petits Platons, (coll. Les Dialogues des petits Platons) ISBN 978-2-36165-042-1 BnF 437118749
- 2018: Faces de l'ange déchu, Le Centurion
