= Iberian Liberation Movement =

Spanish militant group

- Movimiento Ibérico de Liberación
- Leader: Salvador Puig Antich
- Dates active: 1971–1973
- Country: Spain
- Headquarters: Tolosa
- Newspaper: Conspiración Internacional Anarquista
- Active regions: Catalonia and Occitania
- Ideology: Anarchism; Left communism; Anti-Francoism
- Political position: Far-left

The Iberian Liberation Movement (Spanish: Movimiento Ibérico de Liberación; MIL) was a Spanish left-wing militant group, which carried out a series of robberies in Catalonia and Occitania during the early 1970s.

== Background ==
Resistance to the Francoist dictatorship experienced a surge during the 1960s, culminating in the protests of 1968. By this time, a new generation of anarchists and left communists sought to carry out "armed propaganda" against the Francoist state, drawing inspiration from the anarchist militias of the Spanish Civil War and the guerrilla warfare waged against the dictatorship by the Spanish Maquis. They saw themselves as successors to the First of May Group, which had carried out symbolic attacks against the dictatorship throughout the decade.

== Establishment ==
In 1970, anti-authoritarian members of the Workers' Commissions, clandestine publishers and exiles came together following a steel workers' strike in Tolosa to form the Autonomous Workers Groups (Spanish: Grupos Obreros Autonomos; GOA). A split quickly opened up over the issue of union elections, with those who opposed electoral participation breaking away and forming the Iberian Liberation Movement (Spanish: Movimiento Ibérico de Liberación; MIL). By June 1972, the MIL had formed its own armed wing, the Autonomous Combat Groups (Spanish: Grupos Autonómos de Combate; GAC).

== Activities ==
Suspicious of permanent organisation, the MIL was conceived as a temporary collection of affinity groups. The group carried out a series of robberies to support strike funds and clandestinely publish literature. In one of their pamphlets, printed in 1971, the group declared: "What are we offering? Nothing! What do we want? Everything!" In August 1972, the group stole a printing press in Tolosa; it was found the following month and returned to its owners, before the MIL stole it again. Salvador Puig Antich, Oriol Solé Sugranyes and Jean Claude Torres were arrested in connection with the robbery and, in March 1973, they were sentenced to several months' imprisonment. At this time, the group was also carrying out a series of bank robberies in Barcelona, during which they collected up to 24 million pesetas.

== Dissolution ==
In early 1973, divisions opened up between the political theorists and militant activists of the GAC, the latter of which came to dominate the organisation. At a congress in August 1973, the MIL voted to dissolve itself. One of its leading members, Puig Antich, was arrested in November 1973 and executed in March 1974. He was later claimed as a martyr by several sections of the anti-Francoist movement, including anarchists, Catalan nationalists and left-wing activists. Two months later, the Internationalist Revolutionary Action Groups (GARI) kidnapped the bank executive Angel Baltasar Suárez, demanding that executions of political prisoners be halted. Suárez was released unharmed, and ex-MIL members Oriol Solé Sugranyes and Josep Lluís Pons Llovet were both saved from execution.

== Bibliography ==
- Key, Anna, ed. (2008). Salvador Puig Antich and the MIL (Moviemiento Iberico de Liberacion). Translated by Sharkey, Paul. Kate Sharpley Library. ISBN 978-1-873605-44-8.
