= Union des jeunesses communistes marxistes-léninistes =

Union of Marxist–Leninist Communist Youth Union des jeunesses communistes marxistes-léninistes
- Abbreviation: UJC(ml)
- Founded: December 10, 1966
- Dissolved: June 12, 1968
- Split from: Union of Communist Students
- Succeeded by: Gauche prolétarienne Vive la révolution
- Ideology: Maoism
- Political position: Far-left

The Union of Marxist–Leninist Communist Youth (French: Union des jeunesses communistes marxistes–léninistes, abbreviated UJC(ml)) was a Maoist revolutionary organization, founded on 10 December 1966 by about a hundred activists expelled from the Union of Communist Students linked to the French Communist Party.

Led notably by Robert Linhart, Benny Lévy, Tiennot Grumbach, and Jacques Broyelle, it was best established in Paris, in the École Normale Supérieure and the Sorbonne. When it was dissolved on 12 June 1968 by a decree of President Charles de Gaulle, its membership formed two new organizations, Proletarian Left and Long Live the Revolution.

== Background to 1965 ==
The Union of Communist Students (Union des étudiants communistes, UEC) was shaken in the early 1960s by important movements that sought above all to wrest it from the control of the French Communist Party (Parti communiste français, PCF), as seen on 27 October 1960 when, in the middle of the Algerian War and in defiance of the Central Committee of the PCF, its national office called for demonstrations against the war alongside the National Union of Students of France (Union nationale des étudiants de France, UNEF).

This revolt also affected the UEC's journal Clarté (Clarity), based since 1962 at 3 Place Paul-Painlevé, and largely controlled by the 'Italians' (so called for their sympathy with the independent-minded Italian Communist Party: Partito Comunista Italiano, PCI) who took over the national office at the UEC's sixth congress at Châtillon-sous-Bagneux in March 1963. A relatively independent programme was adopted there, particularly with regard to the new student situation and the link with workers, and the delegate of the Italian Communist Youth Federation received an ovation, at a time when the PCF had a conflictual relationship with Palmiro Togliatti's PCI.

The PCF decided to take back control and to marginalize the 'Italian wing'. The seventh congress, which met at Palaiseau in March 1964, maintained the status quo, but in December 1964 the national office of the UEC, attacked by the central committee of the PCF after the fall of Nikita Khrushchev on 15 October, decided to publish in Clarté a letter to the committee. This, the political testament of the 'Italians', was published in the January 1965 issue: it is a violent indictment of Stalinism ('a serious deviation from Marxism'), calling for an end to 'workerism' and arguing for the complete autonomy of the UEC from the PCF.

The eighth congress of the UEC, which took place at Montreuil in the Parc Montreau at the beginning of March 1965, was marked by the fall of the 'Italians', with the support of the 'Ulm circle'. Several members of this circle were close to the philosopher Louis Althusser, who taught at the École Normale Supérieure in the Rue d'Ulm. The circle published a Roneotyped journal, the Cahiers marxistes–léninistes (Marxist–Leninist notebooks), which ran to fifteen numbers. Some of the members of this current and their sympathizers joined the leadership of the UEC, where they organized themselves as a fraction (forbidden by the principles of communist movements). Their main political target was 'revisionism', a term which included Khrushchev's version of 'peaceful coexistence' as much as the Communist Party's lack of resolve in social and political conflicts.
