= Tony Lévy =

Tony Lévy (born 1943 in Egypt) is an historian of mathematics, specializing particularly in Hebrew mathematics.

His family left Egypt in 1957 for Belgium and France after the Suez Crisis but his elder brother Eddy Levy remained in Egypt. A political activist, the latter converted to Islam and took the name Adel Rifaat. He would join France in the 80s and form with Bahgat Elnadi the binomial of political scientists and scholars of Islam known under the pseudonym Mahmoud Hussein. His other brother is the activist, philosopher and writer Benny Levy. Like his younger brother Benny, Tony was an extreme left militant in the 1960s and 1970s.

== Publications ==
- L'Infini et le nombre chez Rabbi Hasdai Crescas : XVIe siècle, 1983
- Mathématiques de l'infini chez Hasdai Crescas (1340–1410) : un chapitre de l'histoire de l'infini d'Aristote à la Renaissance, 1985
- Figures de l'infini : les mathématiques au miroir des cultures, 1987
- Le Chapitre I, 73 du "Guide des égarés" et la tradition mathématique hébraïque au moyen âge : Un commentaire inédit de Salomon b. Isaac, 1989
- L'Étude des sections coniques dans la tradition médiévale hébraïque, ses relations avec les tradictions arabe et latine, 1989
- Éléments d'Euclide, 1991
- Gersonide, commentateur d'Euclide : traduction annotée de ses gloses sur les Eléments, 1992
- Gersonide, le Pseudo-Tusi, et le postulat des paralleles : Les mathématiques en hébreu et leurs sources arabes, 1992
- L'histoire des nombres amiables : le témoignage des textes hébreux médiévaux, 1996
- La littérature mathématique hébraïque en Europe du XIe au XVIe siècle, 1996
- La matematica hebraica, 2002
- A Newly-Discovered Partial Hebrew Version of al-Khārizmī's Algebra, 2002
- L'algèbre arabe dans les textes hébraïques (I) : un ouvrage inédit d'Isaac ben Salomon Al-Aḥdab (XVIe siècle), 2003
- Maïmonide philosophe et savant, 1138–1204, 2004 (in collaboration)
- Sefer ha-middot : a mid-twelfth-century text on arithmetic and geometry attributed to Abraham ibn Ezra, 2006 (in collaboration)
- L'algèbre arabe dans les textes hébraïques (II) : dans l'Italie des XVe et XVIe siècles : sources arabes et sources vernaculaires, 2007
