= Leili Echghi =

Iranian sociologist

- لیلی عشقی
- Education: Paris Descartes University (PhD)
- Scientific career
- Thesis: Tensions culturelles dans une société en changement économique: Téhéran 1975 (1981)
- Doctoral advisor: André Piatier

Leili Echghi (fl. 1975–present) is an Iranian sociologist. She is known for her works on the Iranian revolution.

== Works ==
- Un temps entre les temps. L'Imam, le chi'isme et l'Iran, introduction by Christian Jambet, Paris : les editions du Cerf, 1992
- Shi'isme et temporalité
- Tensions culturelles dans une société en changement économique: Téhéran 1975
- Islam et libération des peuples musulmans Paris Inodep 1984
