= Olivier Wieviorka =

French historian

Olivier Wiewiorka
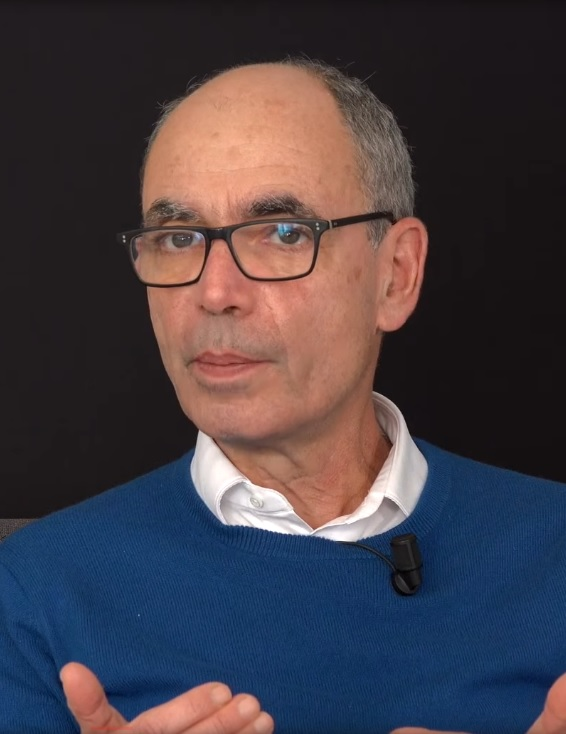
- 2013
- Born: 2 February 1960 (age 66); Enghien-les-Bains, France
- Education: École Normale Supérieure de Saint-Cloud; Sciences Po; Paris 1 Panthéon-Sorbonne University
- Occupation: Historian

Olivier Wiewiorka (born 1960) is a French historian specializing in the history of World War II and the French Resistance. He is a faculty member at the École normale supérieure de Cachan.

He is the brother of historian Annette Wiewiorka and sociologist Michel Wiewiorka.

His paternal grandparents, Polish Jews, were arrested in Nice during World War II and murdered at Auschwitz. His father, a refugee in Switzerland, and his mother, daughter of a Parisian tailor and a refugee in Grenoble, survived the war.

== Works ==
Normandy: The Landings to the Liberation of Paris (Harvard University Press, 2018)
