= Roland Castro =

French architect and political activist (1940–2023)

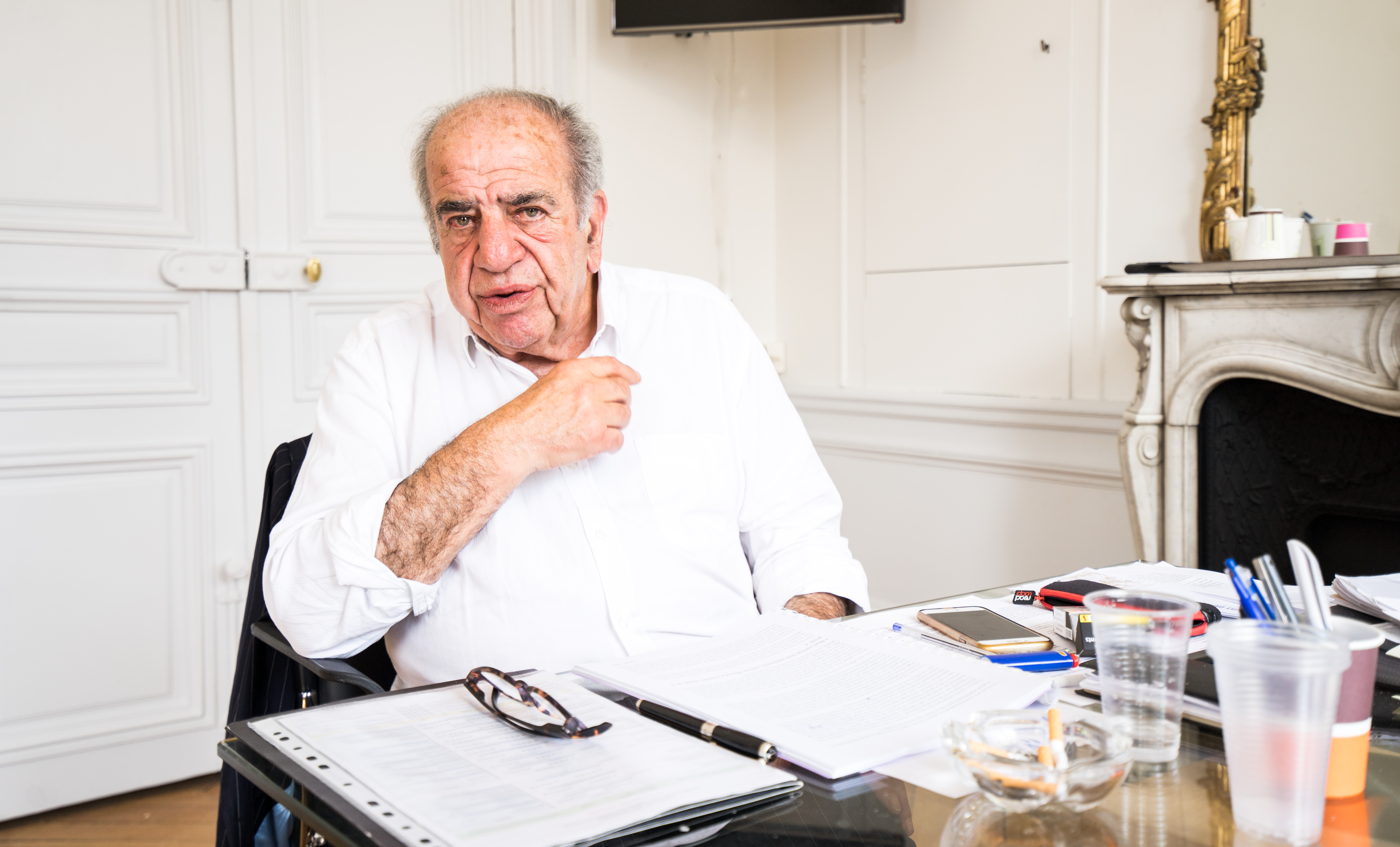
- Castro in 2018
- Born: 16 October 1940; Limoges, France
- Died: 9 March 2023 (aged 82); 13th arrondissement of Paris, France
- Occupation: Architect
- Known for: Concrete utopia
- Children: Zazon

Roland Castro (16 October 1940 – 9 March 2023) was a French architect and political activist.

== Biography ==
Roland Castro was born in Limoges on 16 October 1940. By the end of 1966 he was a member of the editorial committee of Melp!, the École Normale Supérieure student association's review, along with Jacques Barda, Hubert Tonka, Pierre Granveaud and Antoine Grumbach. Melp! helped to articulate the dissatisfaction of students in the lead-up to the protests of 1968.

His thinking integrates political ideas with urban architecture. He belonged to the concrete utopia movement, which he described as "an attempt to rebuild and renovate politics around revolutionary values." He is also the father of Elizabeth Castro, alias Zazon, comedian and actress. From 2008 to 2009, Roland Castro was appointed by the President of the Republic Nicolas Sarkozy to lead a multidisciplinary team on the future of Greater Paris. He argued for the implementation of symbolic high places of the republic and of culture, and to restore intensity and beauty to the "suburbs".

Castro died in Paris on 9 March 2023, at the age of 82.

== Architectural accomplishments ==
- Many renovations by remodeling of large structures
- Trades Council of Saint-Denis (Seine-Saint-Denis)
- Family housing in Noisy-le-Grand
- Université de technologie de Belfort-Montbéliard ( UTBM )
- National Center for the comics and images (CNBDI) in Angoulême
- Employed by Charles Pasqua to renovate the cities of the Hauts-de-Seine (as an architect).
- Media center, hotel and housing, 115 rue de Bagnolet, Paris 20.
- 2008-2009: Participation in the consultation "Le Grand Pari(s) de l’agglomération parisienne"

== Political engagement ==
Roland Castro had a political career in various left movements:

- Activist in the Union of Communist Students and the French Communist Party, from which he was expelled in 1965. He joined the Union des jeunesses communistes marxistes-léninistes the following year.
- Maoist in the 1970s, in the movement Vive le Communisme (1968), which soon after transformed itself into Vive la révolution (VLR), which he cofounded with Tiennot Grumbach.
- After the dissolution of VLR in 1971, he met Lacan and began a psychoanalysis with him that lasted seven years.
- As a Mitterrandist in 1981, he created a structure of response and reflection on the suburbs called Banlieues 89.
- Journal Légende du siècle : la conspiration des égos (Legend of the century: the conspiracy of egos) with Jean-Paul Dollé, Jean-Pierre Le Dantec and Léon Schwartzenberg. Five issues were published between 1987 and 1992.
- Resigned from the Socialist Party on the day that Bernard Tapie entered the government.
- Back to the CPF under Robert Hue, member of the National Party.
- In response to the Chirac / Le Pen duel in the second round of the 2002 presidential elections, in 2003 created with some friends including Eric Halphen 's MUC, the Movement of concrete utopia. This is a new "political movement" (not party) as a citizen, which he called evolutionary and which he chaired.
- Announced his candidacy for the 2007 presidential election.
- In 2011, he announced support for the candidacy of Arnaud Montebourg in the Socialist primaries.

== Concrete utopia movement ==
The concrete utopia movement (MUC) is a political movement created by Roland Castro and others in 2003. This movement defends "89 proposals to restore social bonds", without revolution transforming society towards more republican equality and justice. These proposals have arisen from the reflection of Roland Castro and his desire to advance "concrete utopias" and is "evolutionary" to give new meaning to politics. In August 2006, he toured from Saint-Tropez to Sarcelles by bus to promote the 89 proposals of the MUC. The candidacy of its leader to the presidential election of 2007 did not succeed. On 12 March 2007 he withdrew due to lack of adequate sponsorship.

== Bibliography ==
- Roland Castro (1984). 1989. Paris: Barrault Éditions. ISBN 978-2736000165.
- Roland Castro (1992). Civilisation urbaine ou barbarie. Paris: Éditions Omnibus. p. 187. ISBN 978-2259026598.
- Roland Castro (2005). J'affirme : Manifeste pour une insurrection du sens. Paris: Éditions Sens & Tonka. p. 160. ISBN 978-2845341227.
- Roland Castro; Sophie Denissof; Jean-Pierre Le Dantec (2005). (Re)Modeler Métamorphose. Paris: Le Moniteur Éditions. p. 246. ISBN 978-2281192285.
- Roland Castro; Claude Perrotin (2007). Faut-il passer la banlocatione au Kärcher ?. Paris: Éditions l'Archipel. p. 139. ISBN 978-2841878949.
- Roland Castro (2010). L'utopie est mon métier. Paris: Éditions l'Archipel. ISBN 978-2809803709.
