= Movement of 22 March =

The Mouvement du 22 Mars (Movement of 22 March) was a French student movement at the University of Nanterre founded on 22 March 1968, which carried out a prolonged occupation of the university's administration building. Writing at the time, Jean-Jacques Lebel described them as "a coalition of Guevarists, Anarchists, and Trotskyites... The most active, determined, and spontaneously revolutionary force in the movement." Among its principal leaders was Daniel Cohn-Bendit, a communist. After occupying the building, the school dean called the police, and a public scuffle ensued that garnered the movement media and intellectual attention. This event was one of a series of clashes that led to the nationwide protests in May 1968 in France.

The events of 22 March became the subject of Robert Merle's 1970 novel Derrière la vitre (published in the US in 1972 as Behind the Glass).

== See also ==
- Protests of 1968
