= Adam Rayski =

Franco-Polish intellectual

- Born: 14 August 1913; Białystok, Belostok Oblast, Russian Empire
- Died: 11 March 2008 (aged 94); Paris, France
- Occupations: Political activist and journalist
- Organization: FTP-MOI
- Political party: Polish Communist Party; French Communist Party
- Movement: Anti-fascism, French Resistance
- Spouse: Idesza Zaromb

Adam Rayski (14 August 1913 – 11 March 2008) was a Franco-Polish intellectual best remembered for his involvement with the French resistance.

== Communist activist ==
Rayski was born as Abraham Rajgrodski to a family of Ashkenazim (Yiddish-speaking Jews) in Białystok, which at the time was part of the vast Russian Empire. His left-wing parents were involved in the Revolution of 1905. After the First World War, Białystok became part of Poland. Active in the Communist Party of Poland, he was expelled from his high school as a trouble-maker. In common with many other Eastern European Jews, Rajgrodski was attracted to Communism because it promised to dissolve all nationalities, religions and ethnicities, thereby rendering the "Jewish Question" moot. Accounts differ about his views towards Poland. The French historian Stéphane Courtois claimed that Rayski "hated" Poland. By contrast, Rayksi's son, Benoît Rayski, has denied Courtois's allegations. Benoît Rayski claimed that his father was deeply attached to Polish culture and literature, and wanted to "integrate" very badly into Polish society.

Under the Sanation military dictatorship that ruled Poland from 1926 to 1939, the Communist Party was illegal and the police were often looking for him. He adopted as his alias the name Adam Rayski, taking the name Adam because in the Bible Adam was the name of the first man created by God, which reflected his belief that Communism would create a new civilization. He also chose the name Adam after Adam Mickiewicz, who was his hero. He took as his surname Rayski because it is a very common Polish surname, allowing him to not attract attention.

In 1932, he immigrated to France, where he studied journalism at the Sorbonne. In 1933, he joined the Jewish section of the French Communist Party. In January 1934, he joined the Main-d'oeuvre immigrée (MOI) section of the PCF (Parti communiste français-French Communist Party). That same month, the MOI launched a Yiddish language newspaper Naye Prese (New Press), which Rayski contributed to as a journalist. As his French improved, he also started writing articles for L'Humanité, the main newspaper of the PCF.

Rayski wrote extensively about the Spanish Civil War in Naye Prese. In his first article, written right after the botched coup d'état of 17 July 1936 led to the civil war in Spain, Rayski- reflecting the Popular Front policy dictated by the Comintern-called for a union of all leftists and liberals against fascism. The news of the German intervention in Spain, which began on 24 July 1936 led him to warn in article on 1 August 1936 that fascism was on the march, which caused him to urge that France strengthen the alliance with the Soviet Union, and for French leftists to campaign against French supporters of the Spanish Nationalists. Rayski labelled General Francisco Franco and General Emilio Mola, the two leaders of the military junta trying to overthrow the Spanish republic, as the heirs to the Inquisitors who persecuted Jews in the Middle Ages. Throughout the civil war, he urged that Jews join the International Brigades fighting for the Spanish republic, as he used highly emotional language to link the Spanish Nationalists with the persecution and expulsions of Spanish Jews in centuries past. Inverting the language of the Nationalists who professed to be engaged in a Catholic "crusade against Communism" that sought to evoke the militant crusading spirit of the medieval Reconquista against Islam, Rayski accused the Nationalists of quite literally wanting to take Spain back to the Middle Ages. The Spanish Civil War was to become something of an obsession for him as most of the articles Rayski wrote in Naye Prese between 1936 and 1938 were about Spain.

The Franco-Israeli historian Renée Poznanski called Rayski a man who was integrated into French society by the means of his "militant Communism" as the PCF came to be a surrogate family for him. Rayski came to be deeply attached to French culture and in particular attended the theaters of Paris. The American journalist Anne Nelson described Rayski as wearing "natty suits" and a black fedora hat, which he always wore regardless of the weather. Rayksi was well known for his fiery, passionate temperament, which was reflected in his writing style. In 1938 he married Idesza "Jeanne" Zaromb, a fellow Polish Jewish immigrant to France who would be his liaison agent during the World War Two. Their son Benoît was born later that year. In 1938, Leo Katz, the editor of Naye Prese was expelled from France, and Rayski together with Louis Gronowski became the new co-editors of Naye Prese, continuing in that role until the French government shut down Naye Prese in the fall of 1939. During the 1938 crisis over the Sudetenland, Rayski followed the Comintern line that a front of the Soviet Union, Britain, and France should support Czechoslovakia against the demands of Germany. Rayski would later rationalize the 1939 German-Soviet non-aggression pact as a Soviet response to the Munich Agreement. Naye Prese was one of the three main Yiddish newspapers in Paris; the other two being the Zionist Parizer Haynt and the Bundist Unzer Shtime. Naye Prese had a daily circulation of about 10, 000 in 1936.

The German-Soviet non-aggression of 23 August 1939 caused him much anguish. In an editorial of 27 August 1939 in Naye Prese, Rayski blamed the "shifty policy of France and England" for the non-aggression pact, arguing that the Soviet Union had been in negotiations to join the Anglo-French "peace front" intended to protect Poland, and insisted it was Anglo-French policies that had driven the Soviets to sign the non-aggression pact. In the same editorial, Rayski also blamed the Danzig crisis on Adolf Hitler, arguing that it was German threats to Poland that had pushed Europe to the brink of war. On 1 September 1939 Germany invaded Poland and on 3 September 1939 France declared war. In an editorial on 4 September 1939, Rayski broke with the Soviet line, writing: "Hitlerism, which from the start has built its existence on the massacre of Jews, has now taken the road to worldwide massacre...We enter the war on the side of the French people...For France and for our people!" Rayski expressed his hope that France would soon win, writing: "Let the name of Adolf Hitler disappear forever! Cursed for always, the idea of National Socialism! No one wanted this war except Hitler and his clique...He will drown in the sea of blood that he has unleashed."

== World War Two ==
In early 1940, he joined a regiment of the Free Polish Army stationed in France, and fought in the campaign of May–June 1940 during the German invasion. In June 1940, he was taken prisoner by the Wehrmacht, but escaped from the POW camp where he was being held outside of Nantes. Under the terms of the armistice signed on 21 June 1940, France was divided into two zones with Germany occupying all of northern France plus the entire Atlantic coastline while most of the south of France remained unoccupied (Italy was also to claim an occupation zone in the Nice area following the armistice of 24 June 1940). The French government, which had relocated to Vichy, retained control of the police forces in all of the zones of France.

On Bastille Day 1940, Rayski returned to Paris. He began to republish Naye Prese under the new title Unzer Wort (One Word). In July 1940, he was a founder of the Jewish resistance group Solidarité. Rayski defined the purpose of Solidarité as: "Some kind of propaganda and above all information was a sine qua non of the organization of resistance". In April 1941, he went to the unoccupied zone in the south of France to assist with helping the Spanish Republican refugees escape from the internment camps at Gurs and Vernet. In May 1941, he went to Marseille where he established an edition of Unzer Wort for the south of France. Operation Barbarossa, the German invasion of the Soviet Union that started on 22 June 1941, was greeted with Rayski with almost palpable relief in an editorial in Unzer Wort, leading him to write: "And so for us to become ourselves again-that is Jews, Frenchmen, antifascists, we needed Hitler's aggression, termed "criminal" against the "homeland of socialism"". On 24 August 1941, Rayski learned from listening to Radio Moscow's Yiddish language broadcasts that the Germans were systemically massacring Jews in the occupied areas of the Soviet Union.

In September 1941, he became the national manager of the MOI, leading him to return to Paris. In November 1941, in an article in Unzer Wort, he first revealed the existence of the Drancy camp outside of Paris, which he called the "French Dachau". The first deportations of Jews from France started in March 1942. At the time, it was announced that this was part of a process known as "resettlement in the East" under which the Third Reich had created an utopian homeland for Jews somewhere in Eastern Europe, where all of the Jews of Europe would be "resettled". Initially, the claim of the mysterious Jewish homeland in Eastern Europe that no one had actually seen was widely believed in France, even by most Jews, and though most French people did not believe the alleged homeland was the paradise that the Nazis had promised, few could imagine the truth. Rayski was aware that Operation Barbarossa was a "war of extermination" as Hitler had labelled it, but he initially believed that the Jews from France being deported were being used as slave labour.

In April 1942, he helped found the Francs-tireurs et partisans – Main-d'oeuvre immigrée (FTP-MOI), the immigrant section of the French Communist resistance. Rayski appointed Boris Holban as the military commander of the FTP-MOI for the Paris area. At the same time, Rayski was active as a journalist in underground newspapers, namely J'accuse and Fraternité. Both during the war and afterward, Rayski was very critical of the Union générale des israélites de France (UGIF), which was created in November 1941 to administer the Jewish community in France. On 7 June 1942, all Jews in the German occupied zone of France were ordered to wear at all times a yellow star of David badge with the word Juif written on it. In a statement, the UGIF urged Jews to wear the yellow badge with "dignity", which led Rayski to condemn the UGIF as abject collaborators who willingly went along with Nazi measures out of the hope that it might improve conditions for French Jews.

On 15 July 1942, Rayski was returning to the room he rented in Paris under a pseudonym with false papers that declared him to be an Aryan, unaware that his wife was trying to flee Paris that day with their son. As a résistant, Rayski felt it better to live apart from his wife. On that day, he recalled that his major concern was the unpleasant smell caused by the sauerkraut that German soldiers were always eating in the outdoor restaurants of Paris. At about 4:30 am on 16 July about 4,500 French policemen began an operation known as the Vel' d'Hiv Roundup to arrest every single Jew living in Paris. On the morning of that day, Rayski described the scene he saw as he was entering the Paris Metro:

"I was descending the stairway leading to the quasis, when I saw before me, buses turning in the direction of the Grenelle bridge, today the Bir-Hakeim bridge. Their unusual appearance struck me instantly. On their back platforms, you could see policemen surrounded with packages, suitcases and all sorts of bundles...Before crossing the bridge, the buses slowed down and I could see some faces. No more possible doubt, simply from the grief of their expressions, I knew what was going on. My knees buckled under my body, I had to lean against the rail. The comrade I met at the meeting place confirmed it. "Yes, it is a massive round-up"".

Rayski spent all of that day, known in French history as Black Thursday, trying to contact his wife to see if she and their son had escaped. Rayski was greatly relieved to find that both his wife and his son had escaped the grande rafle (great round-up) of 16–17 July 1942. After hiding their son away with a teacher friend of his wife, Rayski spent the night with her at his room, where he noted that she was so shaken by the grande rafle that she had difficulty sleeping and she held him tight, saying she had been so afraid that she had lost him that day.

In August 1942, he founded the National Movement against Racism (MNCR). The MNCR was essentially a continuation of the work of Solidarité in providing support for those in hiding while also serving as an early warning system for upcoming rafles, but only with Gentiles involved. Between August 1942 and April 1943, Solidarité and the MNCR provided the false papers that allowed 607 Jewish children to be placed with Gentile families in the Paris area. In 1990, he recalled what he learned in the summer of 1942, saying: "A Polish man escaped from Warsaw that summer, in August, and told us about the decision to exterminate the Jews".

From the fall of 1942 onward, he wrote pamphlets in French, Yiddish and Polish warning Jews that "resettlement in the East" did not mean moving to some Jewish utopia vaguely located somewhere in Eastern Europe as the Nazis were promising, but rather being exterminated. In his pamphlets, Rayski warned that to take part in the "resettlement in the East" would mean death, and urged Jews to go into hiding to escape the "resettlement in the East". Rayski learned from a Spanish Republican soldier who had escaped from the Gurs camp and been handed over by the French authorities to work as a slave for the Todt organisation in Poland, who had subsequently managed to escape back to France, that there was a camp in Silesia called Auschwitz where Jews were being exterminated via gassing. Rayski found the man credible, but suffered much doubt about whether he should publish allegations based upon a single source that he could not confirm, and he deeply hoped that his story was not true. Despite his doubts, in an article in J'accuse published on 10 October 1942, Rayski stated that about 11, 000 Jews from France since March 1942 had been exterminated via gassing at Auschwitz.

Rayski observed that a disproportionate number of the members of the FTP-MOI were veterans of the International Brigades who had fought in the Spanish Civil War, providing a great advantage as these were men who had experienced combat and were well accustomed to handling guns and bombs. Rayski also noted that a disproportionate number of the FTP-MOI were like himself Jewish, which provided a certain desperation to their efforts since for them, the victory of the Third Reich would mean their extermination. Rayski argued that for ordinary French people, that if Nazi Germany won the war, France would remain occupied, but the French people would continue to exist while for himself and all the other Jews in the world, they would all cease to exist in the event of a German victory, making their underground struggle a matter of existential importance. Rayski recalled: "We brought together many young Jews without parents or homes in action groups of three people. During the winter of 1942–43, we had about 300 people, mostly young people, in the Jewish groups of the Francs-Tireurs et Partisans". Rayski remembered the main problem was the lack of weapons, recalling: "Antiquated pistols didn't always come with the corresponding bullets, so we had to consider switching over to bombs". Rayski was greatly helped by Cristina Luca Boico, a Romanian student at the Sorbonne and the FTP-MOI intelligence chief who supplied him with materials for making bombs from the chemistry department at the Sorbonne.

Some latter day controversy has been caused by the fact that most of the attacks staged by the FTP-MOI were made by men as the FTP-MOI generally did not employ women as assassins. This was especially controversial as during the same period, women were active in fighting in the Soviet Union, Yugoslavia and Greece. About a quarter of the andartes (guerrillas) of the National Liberation Front in Greece were women. Rayski defended the choice of men as assassins for the FTP-MOI, stating it was suicidal for the FTP-MOI to engage in sustained shootouts owing to the disparity in firepower and numbers, and as such its members had to attack swiftly by throwing a bomb and/or firing a few shots before making an equally swift retreat. Rayski argued that men were better suited for making the "lightning fast" retreats by running down the streets of Paris as swiftly as possible than were women as he maintained that the conditions that allowed for more sustained fighting in the forests of Russia and the mountains of the Balkans did not exist in Paris.

He later stated that the greatest mistake that the FTP-MOI ever made was to accept Lucienne Goldfarb, better known as Katia la Rouquine (Katy the Redhead), into its ranks. Goldfarb, whose parents and siblings had been deported in the grande rafle of 16–17 July 1942, joined the FTP-MOI in late 1942, saying she wanted to avenge her family. Unknown to Rayski, Goldfarb was a prostitute and a long time police informer who used her police connections to secure herself immunity from being deported. In exchange for immunity and regular cash payments, Goldfarb infiltrated the FTP-MOI for the French police and thanks to information supplied by her, the French police made their first mass arrests of FTP-MOI members in March 1943. Over the course of one night, the French police arrested 80 FTP-MOI members. Despite the fact that her entire family had been exterminated at Auschwitz, Goldfarb felt no regret for her actions, and seemed to be motivated only by greed as she worked for the same police force that had deported her family. The French police used their favorite filature (spinning) methods of watching the movements of one FTP-MOI member, if necessary for months, in order to learn about his or her contacts, and then to follow the others, thus building up a comprehensive picture of the structure and membership of the FTP-MOI.

As the police pressure increased, Rayski recalled: "On May 2, 1943, the leadership of the Jewish section met and demanded two things from the PCF leadership: First, that the organization, which felt surrounded by the police, withdraw in order to cut the spinning mills, to save our executives and therefore to preserve the future of combat. Then, to consider the gradual transfer to the southern zone of Jewish, political and military organizations, so that our fighters regain support from the Jews of the southern zone. The management's response was very clear: we were told that "Communist cadres are not made to remain in reserve" and we were criticized for our "capitulatory" attitude. As disciplined Communists, we bowed".

Rayski was greatly moved by the news of the Warsaw Ghetto Uprising of 1943. He first learned about the uprising by listening to the French language broadcasts of the BBC. In an editorial of 15 June 1943 in the Yiddish language underground newspaper Unzer Wort he wrote:

"Rise up for final combat against Nazi barbarism! Hear the cry of millions of our brothers tortured in the Polish camps and ghettoes! Near at hand is the day when Hitler's band will have to account for its crimes. This sea of blood will never be calmed nor will the innocent dead be silent. The specter of defeat haunts Nazi bandits. It appears to them in the faces of the millions of their victims who rise from their tombs, emerge from the flames and death factories. They spread out like a formidable army, behind them march the living, all of the persecuted, all of humanity, to remove from the surface of the earth all traces of Nazi barbarism."

Rayski noted that both J'accuse and Fraternité were meant for Gentile audiences, and both newspapers gave extensive coverage to the Warsaw Ghetto uprising.

Throughout his career as a résistant, Rayski promoted the idea of unifying all of the Jewish groups into a sort of Jewish Popular Front. In April 1943, at a meeting in Paris it was agreed to merge Solidarité, the Union of Jewish Women, the People's Relief, the Union of Jewish Youth, and a number of other Jewish groups into a new group, the Union of Jews for Resistance and Mutual Aid (Union des Juifs pour la Résistance et l'Entraide-UJRE). Afterwards, Rayski devoted his time to persuading other Jewish resistance groups to join the UJRE.

Due in part to the information supplied by Goldfarb, the French police launched a series of raids between May and July 1943 intended to end the FTP-MOI once and for all. Rayski wrote that: "By late July, nearly the entire Jewish leadership had fallen" as the police had arrested over 60 MOI leaders. By the end of July 1943, only Rayski, Sophie Schwartz and Léon Chertok were left of the MOI leaders who had founded the FTP-MOI in April 1942, with the rest all dead. Rayski believed there was an informer in the ranks of the FTP-MOI and had the FTP-MOI intelligence chief Luca Boico start an investigation. The investigation led to Goldfarb, whom Rayski ordered to be executed as an informant. Goldfarb was able to escape the FTP-MOI assassins, going on to be become the madam of an expensive brothel that catered to rich and powerful men after the war while remaining a police informant, becoming a sort of underworld celebrity in France.

In July 1943, Rayski, who was wanted by the police, relocated to the south of France, which he felt he would be safer. In a memo he wrote in December 1943, he stated: "We must succeed in involving the majority of the Jewish population in the fight against the enemy, both in the Resistance and in the defense of their own existence". Rayski called for the end of the division between Israelites (assimilated French Jews) and the Juifs (the insulting term for immigrant Jews), saying it was necessary "to widen our influence among French Jews" with the aim of "achieving the full unity of the Jewish population of France". In the same memo, Rayski also asserted that he refused to consider "any hierarchy of atrocities committed by the Nazis" when it came "to give priority to the Jewish question or the question of the deportations of the French [a reference to the STO]". In January 1944, he was one of the co-founders of the Conseil Représentatif des Institutions juives de France (CRIF). At the time it was known as the General Committee for Jewish Defense (CGD)- an underground organization whose mission is to help Jews.

At the secret conference that founded the CRIF, Rayski represented the Communists, Fajvel Shrager represented the Bund, and Joseph Fischer represented the Zionists. The debate about Zionism proved to be the most difficult subject at the conference as Fischer and the other Zionist delegates insisted that the group issue a statement in favor of a Jewish state in Palestine, to which Rayski was opposed to. At most, Rayski was willing to issue a statement declaring a general opposition to British imperialism in the Near East and to the 1939 White Paper issued by the British government, which drastically limited Jewish immigration to the Palestine Mandate, both of which the Zionists found insufficient. Despite his opposition to Zionism, Rayski was in favor of unlimited Jewish immigration to the Holy Land, making him a critic of the White Paper. In an attempt to find a compromise, Rayski put forward a proposal that the CRIF declare its support for a Jewish homeland in the Soviet Union, which may have been a reference to Birobidzhan, the Jewish homeland that Stalin created in the Soviet Far East on the banks of the Amur river on the border with China. Another compromise proposal put forward by Rayski was for the CRIF to declare its support for a federal state in Palestine, where the Jews and Palestinian Arabs would share the Holy Land after the war. The debate about whatever the CRIF should declare its support for Zionism or not was quite heated and Rayski at one point stated if the CRIF should "pledges allegiance" to Zionism, he and other Communist Jews would not join the CRIF. Rayski took an anti-Zionist position, writing at the time "the CRJF could well accept the point of view of the Zionists but, in that case, it would not be the Representative Council of French Jews but the Representative Council of Zionists". Rayski felt there was a need for "an understanding with the Arab population" of Palestine to prevent a Jewish-Arab war in the Middle East after the expected end of the British mandate and declared that the concerns of "French Jews" were vastly more important to him than "foreign territories".

The conference was unable to agree to a charter for the CRIF, and not until the summer of 1944 was a charter finally issued. The charter was very much a compromise about the Palestine question as the CRIF demanded the "immediate abolition of the 1939 White Paper" and declared its support for "the demands of the Jewish Agency and other relevant bodies" without actually stating what those demands were. The CRIF also declared its support for "national coexistence and friendship between all parts of society" in the Palestine mandate, for the "broadest understanding with the Arab population" and for equality for the "non-Jewish residents of Palestine". Rayski who was living in Lyon took part in the first public meeting of the CRIF on 5 September 1944, just two days after the city had been liberated.

== Post-War ==
After the war, Rayski was awarded the Medal of the Resistance and the Croix de Guerre. In May 1945, he attended a conference in New York, where delegations of various Jewish groups from around the world met to discuss ways of aiding Holocaust survivors. In June 1945, the PCF dissolved the MOI, which marginalized Rayski. It was French Communist policy to encourage Communists from Eastern Europe who taken part in the resistance to return to their countries of origin in order to make the Communist resistance appear more French. Rayski's friend Boris Holban returned to Romania while he himself felt very strong pressure to return to Poland.

In September 1949, he returned to Poland, where was active as a journalist. Rayski was appointed an undersecretary in the Information ministry whose task was to manage the entire Polish media. Courtois called him a "Stalinist apparatchik". Rayski was by his own account disillusioned with life in Stalinist Poland, recalling: "Man was degraded. The harshness of the everyday battle for life carried him back several centuries...An egocentrism which had nothing in common with the individualism of bourgeois society and was rent by the laws of competition dominated everyday relations". Rayski recalled that atmosphere in Warsaw in the early 1950s was one of fear and dread with even members of the Central Committee living in constant terror about the possibility of Joseph Stalin ordering a purge of the Polish United Workers' Party.

At about 3 am on very cold night in February 1950, Rayski was awakened with a call to report to the Central Committee at once. Upon arriving, Raysk met Jakub Berman who told him that the party's newspaper, Trybuna Ludu, was going to run an article attacking Władysław Gomułka as a "foreign agent". Berman took the article as a sign that Gomułka would soon be charged with high treason, which Berman took as the beginning of a purge of the party. Rayski concluded that through Gomułka was indeed charged in 1951 that the much dreaded purge did not place owing to the "cautious, but firm will" shown by the Polish Communist leaders in quietly resisting Soviet pressure.

On 28 June 1956, a workers' uprising against the Communist dictatorship broke out in Poznań. Through the uprising was put down by the Polish Army, the Communist regime was on the defensive and many expected a revolution to break out in Poland at any moment. As an undersecretary of state, Rayski played an important role in liberalizing the Polish press in the summer of 1956, which helped to set the stage for the Polish October revolution later that year. During the Polish October revolution of 1956 that saw a nationalist faction in the Polish United Workers' Party led by Gomułka overthrow the Stalinist leadership of the party, Rayski was accused of Courtois of having pursued an ambiguous line. Rayski disapproved of the bargain struck by Gomułka at a dramatic meeting of the Central Committee on the night of 19 October 1956 with Nikita Khrushchev who arrived unannounced in Warsaw that night under which he promised to keep Poland within the Soviet sphere of influence in exchange for greater autonomy within the Soviet bloc.

In July 1957, he was dismissed for writing articles critical of the Communist dictatorship, which led him to return to France, where he announced that he had resigned from the Polish United Workers' Party. He was convicted of treason in absentia by a Polish court. Courtois denied that Rayksi had really defected, claiming he was still loyal to the Communist regime, and was operating in France as a spy. On 6 October 1959, he was arrested by the French police, who accused him of passing information to Hermann Bertele, a Polish spy operating in Paris. In July 1961, he was convicted of espionage for Poland and sentenced to 7 years in prison. Following lobbying by several resistance fighters, in March 1963 President Charles de Gaulle pardoned Rayski. In an undated document, Rayski writing in the third person declared: "A. Rayski, who is no longer in agreement with certain ideas of the Communist Party, has preferred to reclaim his independence. Nonetheless, he maintains a faithful memory of the past, which allows him to evoke with great honesty the actions of the resistance of Communist Jews. He directed the UJRE until 1949".

Rayski worked as a historian, writing several books about the subject of Jewish resistance in France. In 1985, he published his memoir Nos illusions perdues ("Our Lost Illusions") about his life in Poland from 1949 to 1957. In Nos illusions perdues, he was deeply critical of the Communist regime in Poland, which he called a "dictatorship" and a "totalitarian regime". Rayski appeared in the 1985 documentary Des terroristes à la retraite (Terrorists in Retirement) by Mosco Boucault to discuss the allegation that he and the other FTP-MOI members were Communist terrorists. During L'Affaire Manouchian of the 1980s, he was a prominent defender of Boris Holban against the allegation that he was a police informer who had betrayed Missak Manouchian. Rayski argued that the man who betrayed Manouchian was Joseph Davidowicz, the political commissar of groupe Manouchian, whom Holban had killed on 28 December 1943.

Rayski proudly noted that during the trial of SS Hauptsturmführer Klaus Barbie in 1987 that the prosecutor Pierre Truche introduced his wartime writings as evidence that the true nature of the "Final Solution to the Jewish Question" was known in wartime France against the claims of Barbie's defense lawyer Jacques Verges. Verges had claimed during the trial that Barbie had no idea about what was happening to the Jews sent for "resettlement in the East", claiming that for he all knew that the homeland for Jews said to be vaguely located in Eastern Europe to which the Jews were being "resettled" was a real place. In response, Truche brought in Rayski's wartime warnings as evidence, leading him to conclude that if Rayski, a man with no special information about the Third Reich knew that the "Final Solution" was really genocide, then it was not possible that a SS Hauptsturmführer such as Barbie could claim ignorance about the true nature of the "Final Solution". In 1989 together with Stéphane Courtois and Denis Peschanski he published Le sang de l'etranger : les immigres de la MOI dans la Resistance, a well regarded history of the FTP-MOI. In Le sang de l'etranger, Rayski, Courtois and Peschanski established the majority of the attacks on German forces in the Paris area between 1942 and 1944 were the work of the FTP-MOI.

On 8 May 1990, he spoke at a rally in West Berlin at the site of the Wannsee Institute, where he talked about the prospect of impeding German reunification. At the time, he stated: "One question remains for today and tomorrow. Is there something in the German nature that predisposes them not to genocide, but to hate of the other? I have no answer. Perhaps the democracy in West Germany tells us there is no truth to that fear. But that is for the Germans to show us, now and in the future."

As a historian, he was greatly opposed to the thesis of alleged Jewish passivity in the face of the "Final Solution of the Jewish Question". In 1998, he wrote: "Has the time not arrived to restore to the millions of victims, by the means of scientifically rigorous and documented research, their status as combatants who were vanished during an entirely unequal combat?" In 1992, Rayski's best known book, Le choix des Juifs sous Vichy – Entre soumission et résistance, an account of Jewish life and resistance in France during the occupation was published. In a review of The Choice, the historian Richard Cohen felt that Rayski had erred in his picture of the French people as being basically opposed to Vichy antisemitism and of being essentially supportive of the Jewish communities. In another review of The Choice, the historian Lars Rensmann called it "...arguably the most detailed and comprehensive account of the Jews and Jewish resistance under Vichy France". Rayski's thesis of French Jews as being very far from the passive subjects of history has been widely accepted as he noted that most French Jews who escaped deportation took action themselves to avoid that fate. His tombstone in Paris bears the inscription "Adam Rayski 1913–2008 He was a Communist and a terrorist when he had to be". The use of the word "terrorist" on his tombstone appears to be meant ironically. His son Benoît Rayski is a prominent intellectual in France.

== Work ==
- Le soulèvement du ghetto de Varsovie et son impact en Pologne et en France, co-written with Georges Wellers, André Kaspi, and Bronia Klibanski, Paris: Center de documentation juive contemporaine, 1984.
- Nos illusions perdues, Paris: éditions Balland, 1985.
- Qui savait quoi?: L'extermination des juifs, 1941–1945, co-written with Stéphane Courtois, Paris: éditions La Découverte, 1987.
- Le sang de l'étranger – les immigrés de la MOI dans la Résistance, co-written with Stéphane Courtois and Denis Peschanski, Paris: éditions Fayard, 1989.
- Le choix des Juifs sous Vichy – Entre soumission et résistance, Paris: éditions La Découverte, 1992, translated into English as The Choice of the Jews under Vichy: Between Submission and Resistance.
- L'Affiche Rouge: Il y A 50 Ans Paris : Délégation à la Mémoire et à l'Information Historique, 1994.
- De Gaulle et les Juifs (1940–1944), Paris: publié par l'Union des résistants et déportés juifs de France, 1994
- "The Jewish Underground Press in France and the Struggle to Expose the Nazi Secret of the Final Solution" pages 616–628 from The Holocaust and History The Known, the Unknown, the Disputed, and the Reexamined, edited by Abraham Peck, Bloomington: Indiana University Press, 1998.

== Books and articles ==
- Black, Jeremy (2007). The Second World War: The home fronts. London: Ashgate. ISBN 9780754626435.
- Brossat, Alain; Klingberg, Sylvie (1983). Revolutionary Yiddishland A History of Jewish Radicalism. London: Veso. ISBN 9781784786083.
- Cohen, Richard (December 2008). "Review of The Choice of the Jews under Vichy: Between Submission and Resistance by Adam Rayski". The Journal of Modern History. 80 (4): 939–941. doi:10.1086/596686.
- Drake, David (2015). Paris at War 1939-1944. Cambridge: Harvard University Press. ISBN 9780674495913.
- Hill, Ronald (1992). Beyond Stalinism Communist Political Evolution. Abingdon-on-Thames: Taylor & Francis. ISBN 9781135193973.
- Gildea, Robert (2015). Fighters in the Shadows A New History of the French Resistance. Cambridge: Harvard University Press. ISBN 9780674286108.
- Gerrits, André (2009). The Myth of Jewish Communism A Historical Interpretation. Amsterdam: P.I.E. Peter Lang. ISBN 9789052014654.
- Jackson, Julien (2001). France: The Dark Years, 1940-1944. Oxford University Press: Oxford. ISBN 9780191622885.
- Nelson, Anne (2017). Suzanne's Children A Daring Rescue in Nazi Paris. New York: Simon & Schuster. ISBN 9781501105340.
- Poznanski, Renée (2001). Jews in France During World War II. Waltham: Brandeis University Press. ISBN 9780874518962.
- Poznanski, Renée (2004). "On Jews, Frenchmen, Communists and the Second World War". In Jonathan Frankel (ed.). Dark Times, Dire Decisions Jews and Communism. Oxford: Oxford University Press. pp. 168–198. ISBN 9780195346138.
- Rayski, Adam (1998). "The Jewish Underground Press in France and the Struggle to Expose the Nazi Secret of the Final Solution". In Abraham Peck (ed.). The Holocaust and History The Known, the Unknown, the Disputed, and the Reexamined. Bloomington: Indiana University Press. pp. 616–629. ISBN 9780253215291.
- Rensmann, Lars (January 2010). "Review of The Choice of the Jews under Vichy: Between Submission and Resistance by Adam Rayski". Journal of Contemporary History. 1 (45): 227–229. doi:10.1177/00220094100450011110. S2CID 162199609.
- Semelin, Jacques (2018). The Survival of the Jews in France, 1940-44. Oxford University Press: Oxford. ISBN 9780190057947.
- Sprout, Leslie A. (2013). The Musical Legacy of Wartime France. Los Angeles: University of California Press. ISBN 9780520275300.
- Sweets, John (2003). "Jews and Non-Jews in France During the Second World War". In David Bankier and Israel Gutman (ed.). Nazi Europe and the Final Solution. Jerusalem: Yad Vashem. pp. 361–373. ISBN 9781845454104.
- Wasserstein, Bernard (2012). On the Eve: The Jews of Europe Before the Second World War. New York: Simon and Schuster. ISBN 978-1416594277.
- Zaagsma, Gerben (2017). Jewish Volunteers, the International Brigades and the Spanish Civil War. London: Bloomsbury. ISBN 978-1472505491.
- Zuccotti, Susan (1999). The Holocaust, the French, and the Jews. Lincoln: University of Nebraska Press. ISBN 9780803299146.
