= Boris Holban =

Russian-born Franco-Romanian communist

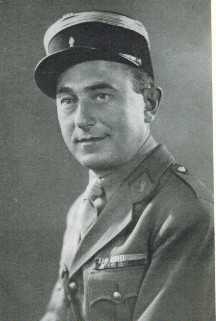
- Born: Baruch Bruhman; 20 April 1908; Otaci, Bessarabia Governorate, Russian Empire
- Died: 27 June 2004 (aged 96); Étampes, Essonne department, France
- Occupation: Political activist
- Organization: FTP-MOI
- Political party: Romanian Communist Party; French Communist Party
- Movement: Anti-fascism, French Resistance

Boris Holban (20 April 1908 – 27 June 2004) was a Russian-born Franco-Romanian communist known for his role in the French Resistance as the leader of FTP-MOI group in Paris and for l’Affaire Manouchian controversy of the 1980s.

== Communist activist ==
Holban was born as Baruch Bruhman to a working class Jewish family in the town of Otaci in Bessarabia (modern Moldova), a province of the vast Russian Empire. Bessarabia had a Romanian majority with a substantial minority of Ashkenazim (Yiddish-speaking Jews). In addition to Yiddish, Bruhman was also fluent in Russian and Romanian. In 1918, Bessarabia became part of Romania. In 1923, Bruhman became a Romanian citizen when a new constitution came in that allowed Jews to be citizens. The Kingdom of Romania was a deeply Francophile country and growing up in 1920s Romania, Bruhman learned French and came to be heavily influenced by French culture long before he ever actually went to France. Like many other Romanian Jewish intellectuals at the time, Bruhman was attracted to Communism as it promised a utopian society where religion, ethnicity and nationality would no longer exist, thus rendering the "Jewish Question" moot.

The Romanian historian Vladimir Tismaneanu wrote that the Jewish community of Bessarabia was especially attracted to Communism as a "rejected minority" in greater Romania. Many Bessarabian Jews believed that the Soviet Union was a humanist society where the "Jewish Question" no longer mattered as it was widely believed in the Bessarabian Jewish community that ethnic, national and religious differences in the Soviet Union had all been subsumed by a common proletarian culture. Bessarabia was also a very backward region where most people lived in dire poverty, and the belief that the Soviet Union was an egalitarian society that was rapidly modernizing was appealing to many Bessarabian Jews living in destitution. The British historian Gavin Bowd wrote: "Like many Jews, he became acutely aware of the persecution of his community. A double sense of oppression therefore pushed Bruhman to join the PCR and engage in political and trade union activity."

As a young man, Bruhman joined the illegal PCR (Partidul Comunist Român-Romanian Communist Party) in 1929 and was imprisoned in 1930 for a short time for his political activities. In 1932, he deserted from the Romanian Army and was forced to live underground as a fugitive before being captured and imprisoned as a deserter. In 1936, he fled Romania for Czechoslovakia as the police were again looking for him as a Communist. In Czechoslovakia, Bruhman studied textile engineering at a technical college. On 28 December 1937, King Carol II of Romania appointed Octavian Goga of the extreme right-wing National Christian Party as the prime minister. During his short period in office, Goga disfranchised the Jewish community. On 22 January 1938 the government of Prime Minister Goga stripped all Romanian Jews who had acquired Romanian citizenship in 1923 of their citizenship, rendering Bruhman together most of the rest of the Romanian Jewish community stateless. Losing his Romanian citizenship to a certain extent estranged him from Romania.

In July 1938, Bruhman travelled to France, and he joined the PCF (Parti communiste français-French Communist Party), intending to fight in the Spanish civil war. In his memoirs, he recalled being very excited about coming to France, which he called "the land of the Revolution and of the Declaration of the Rights of Man, the land of the Commune and the Popular Front". Paris was the principle transit point for volunteers for the International Brigades fighting for the Spanish republic as despite its professed neutrality, the French government during the Popular Front period leaned in a pro-Republican neutrality and ignored the activities of the Comintern in sending volunteers to Spain. By the time he arrived in Paris, the International Brigades were in the process of being disbanded, and he did not fight in Spain. Bruhman became very involved in recruiting Romanians living in France for the PCF and his roommate was Albert Youdine, a Romanian Jewish intellectual who was also a PCF member. For both men, lacking families and friends in Paris, the PCF became a sort of surrogate family that allowed them to integrate into French society.

In September 1939, he enlisted in the First Regiment of Foreign Volunteers of the French Army under the alias Boris Holban, the name that he came to be known as. As a stateless person, Holban very much feared that he might be deported from France to Romania, and he knew that the French state was likely to grant French citizenship to foreigners who enlisted in the French Army. In June 1940, he was taken prisoner by the Wehrmacht. He later escaped from a POW camp in Metz in December 1940. Holban's escape was assisted by a nun, Sister Hélène Studler. Through he was a Communist and atheist, Holban always treasured the medal of the Virgin Mary given to him by Sister Studler, a woman he portrayed as very saintly in a biography of her written by him that was published in 1999.

== In the Resistance ==
In 1941, he joined the Francs-Tireurs et Partisans (FTP), the armed wing of the PCF. The Franco-Israeli historian Renée Poznanski described Holban as a "militant Communist". Holban welcomed Operation Barbarossa as it allowed him to undertake undercover work against Nazi Germany. Holban's work as a member of the illegal Romanian Communist Party and his experiences of Romanian prisons made him accustomed to undercover work and thus well suited for the resistance. In April 1942, the PCF created an armed wing of its Main d'Oeuvre Immigrée ("Migrant Workforce") representing immigrants called the FTP-MOI under the leadership of Holban. Bowd wrote: "Bruhman became part of a resistance network in which Romanians played a disproportionate role." Holban divided the FTP-MOI into four detachments-the first consisting of Hungarians and Romanians, the second of Poles, the third of Italians and the fourth being a mixed group of various other nationalities. The intelligence chief of the FTP-MOI was Holban's fellow Romanian, Cristina Luca Boico, who had the responsibility of selecting targets and gathering as much information as possible about the targets, through Holban always had the ultimate power of decision about whatever attack would go through or not.

One of Holban's superiors, the Franco-Polish Communist Adam Rayski observed that a disproportionate number of the members of the FTP-MOI were veterans of the International Brigades who had fought in the Spanish Civil War, providing a great advantage as these were men who had experienced combat and were well accustomed to handling guns and bombs. Rayski also noted that a disproportionate number of the FTP-MOI were Jewish like himself, which provided a certain desperation to their efforts since for them, the victory of the Third Reich would mean their extermination. Rayski argued that for ordinary French people, if Nazi Germany won the war, France would remain occupied but the French people would continue to exist, while for himself, Holban, and all the other Jews in the FTP-MOI, they would die in the event of a German victory, making their underground struggle a matter of existential importance. Rayski recalled: "We brought together many young Jews without parents or homes in action groups of three people. During the winter of 1942–43, we had about 300 people, mostly young people, in the Jewish groups of the Francs-Tireurs et Partisans".

On 5 August 1942, in an attack organized by Holban, three Romanians belonging to the FTP-MOI tossed grenades into a group of Luftwaffe men watching a football game at the Jean-Bouin Stadium in Paris, killing eight and wounding 13. The Germans claimed three were killed and 42 wounded; this let them execute more hostages, as Field Marshal Hugo Sperrle demanded three hostages be shot for every dead German and two for each of the wounded. The Germans did not have that many hostages in custody and settled for executing 88 people on 11 August 1942. In the first six months of 1943, Holban organised more than 93 different attacks in Paris. Under Holban's leadership, the FTP-MOI between January–June 1943 were responsible for 14 train derailments, 34 acts of arson or bombings of buildings, and 43 assassinations in Paris. The FTP-MOI became an elite group within the FTP that was always assigned the most dangerous missions, which Holban regarded as an honor. Bowd wrote in 2014: "The detachments commanded by Bruhman turned out to be the most courageous and deadly arm of the Communist resistance in the Paris area: as foreigners, and often Jews, they had little to lose in occupied France, while a long experience of clandestine activity and civil war had made them well-prepared." The French police formed two special units to track down the resistance, namely the Brigades spéciales, which were divided into Brigade spéciale 1 for French resistance groups and Brigade spéciale 2, whose sole task was to track down the FTP-MOI. Brigade spéciale 2 used the favorite filature (spinning) methods of the French police, carefully watching one member of the FTP-MOI, if necessary for months, to learn about his or her contacts, and then following the others. The degree of importance attached to hunting down the FTP-MOI could be seen in that Brigade spéciale 2 had an average of 100 policemen assigned just to watch the movements of every one FTP-MOI member under surveillance.

In July 1943, Holban was replaced as the leader of the FTP-MOI by the Armenian Communist Missak Manouchian as he believed that the organisation needed to slow down the pace of attacks to focus more on organisating itself as the police pressure was growing more intense by the day, which were contrary to the party's orders for more and more attacks. Holban's version of events was disputed by his superior, Henri Rol-Tanguy. Rol-Tanguy later stated: "il n’a jamais exigé quoi que ce soit des FTP-MOI et qu’il n’ a jamais démis ou nommé quiconque leur appartenant" ("he never demanded anything from FTP-MOI and he never dismissed or appointed anyone belonging to them"). Bowd that regardless of who was telling the truth that it seems that Holban had some sort of dispute with the FTP leadership. Holban was not on the best of terms with either Manouchian or the political commissar of the FTP-MOI, Joseph Davidowicz, who had named Manouchian as Hoban's successor as he felt that Manouchian was more aggressive.

Despite his demotion, Holban remained active in the FTP-MOI. On 28 September 1943, the FTP-MOI scored its most spectacular success with the assassination in Paris of SS Standartenführer Julius Ritter, whose role in working with the Service du travail obligatoire (STO) to bring forced labor to Germany had made him one of the most hated men in France. Holban had planned the assassination, through he was no longer the FTP-MOI commander by the time it occurred. The Reichsführer SS Heinrich Himmler was enraged by Ritter's assassination and came to follow the French police investigation of the FTP-MOI. Himmler had SS-Sturmbannführer Herbert Hagen visit Vichy to personally tell the French Premier Pierre Laval that Himmler wanted to see the immediate end of the Jewish "terrorist" attacks in France and that the "foreign Jews should rendered incapable of doing further harm". Laval in turn promised Hagen that the number one priority of the French police was to wipe out the FTP-MOI.

Holban left Paris to lead a maquis band in the forests of the Ardennes made up of young Frenchmen escaping service with the STO and escaped Soviet POWs. After Manouchian was arrested in November 1943, Holban resumed leadership of the FTP-MOI in December 1943. Holban assigned Luca Boico to lead the investigation into who betrayed the groupe Manouchian, which led them to the political commissar, Joseph Davidowicz, whom it was discovered had cracked under torture after being arrested by Brigade spéciale 2 in October 1943. Davidowicz was stabbed to death as a result during a meeting in a safehouse in Bourg-la-Reine on 28 December 1943.

After arriving at the safehouse, Holban confronted Davidowicz with the evidence gathered by Luca Boico; after some denials he finally confessed. Holban later recalled:

"One of us read our conclusions to him before he was executed. Once this sad and grisly encounter was over, we had to act to ensure the safehouse was not compromised and that the tenants were not exposed to any consequences-a safehouse was particularly valuable to the party. What happened next was a nightmare. In the middle of the night, under curfew (it was about 3 in the morning), six armed men dragged the body. If we had met a routine patrol, we would had been done for. Exhausted, we arrived at a piece of wasteland, dumped the body, and did our best to cover it. At six in the morning with the curfew over, we finally left. Only the gun remained in the house. In pairs, we got on the train back to Paris".

About the charge that it was unjust to execute a man who had only given information to the police under torture, Holban wrote: "We must not judge Davidowicz with today's eyes and today's attitudes. At the time, it would have been simply inconceivable to let him live".

During the liberation of Paris between 19 and 25 August 1944, Holban took part in the revolt and led a group which seized the Romanian consulate in Paris (the Romanian embassy have been moved to Vichy) together with the Romanian tourist office, both of which were staffed by officials loyal to the regime of Ion Antonescu. Alongside Holban, the seizures were co-commanded by Cristina Luca Boico, Gheorghe Vasilichi and Ion Marinescu. At the time, it was announced that this was intended as the first step towards the overthrow of Antonescu. However, on 23 August, in a coup led by King Michael, Antonescu was dismissed as prime minister by the king, who appointed a new government that signed an armistice with the Allies and switched sides in the war. After the liberation of Paris in August 1944, Holban rejoined the French Army as the commander of battalion 51/22, leading a unit mostly made up of FTP-MOI men that was dissolved in June 1945.

== Return to Romania ==
In February 1946, Jacques Duclos called for a meeting of the leading FTP-MOI leaders where he told them:

we advise all those from countries liberated by the Red Army to return there. This is their country, they know the mentality of their country, its language, its customs, their duty as communists is to help their Party to transform society, in order to make socialism, social justice triumph. (Note: "...nous conseillons à tous ceux qui sont originaires des pays libérés par l’Armée rouge d’y retourner. C’est leur pays, ils connaissent la mentalité de leur pays, sa langue, ses coutumes, leur devoir de communistes est d’aider leur Parti à transformer la société, afin de faire triompher le socialisme, la justice sociale")

Holban later recalled in his memoirs:

It didn't take much more to convince us to return to our respective countries. As for me, it doesn't matter that I was not even born in Romania and that I was stripped of Romanian nationality in 1938: I had campaigned there". (Note: "Il n’en fallait pas plus pour nous convaincre de retourner dans nos pays respectifs. Quant à moi, peu importe que je ne sois même pas né en Roumanie et que j’aie été déchu de la nationalité roumaine en 1938 : j’y avais milité")

It was only later that Holban realized that Duclos was embarrassed by the disproportionate number of foreigners who had taken part in the resistance, and wanted the FTP-MOI members to leave France in order to make the Communist resistance appear more French.

In 1946, Holban returned to Romania, where he became first a colonel and then a general in the Romanian Army under the Communist regime. Upon his return, he legally changed his name to Boris Holban, which had been an alias until then, writing in 1989:

From Bruhman, I will become Holban. It sounds more Romanian! Besides, I will not be the only one to take a new surname. Whether in the military or other institutions, it soon became difficult to find Rotsteins, Finkelsteins and other Jewish names. Just Marinescu, Cristescu, Ionescu, etc. Do not 'shock' the sensitive ears of the good anti-Semites who swarm [into the party]). (Note: "De Bruhman, je deviendrai Holban. Cela sonne plus roumain! D’ailleurs je ne serai pas le seul à prendre un nouveau patronyme. Que ce soit dans l’armée ou d’autres institutions, on a bientôt du mal à trouver des Rotstein, Finkelstein et autres noms juifs. Rien que Marinescu, Cristescu, Ionescu, etc. Il ne faut pas ‘choquer’ les oreilles sensibles des bons antisémites qui pullulent")

Holban's rise up the ranks was rapid as the Communist regime deeply distrusted officers who had served in the Royal Romanian Army, and he was appointed Director of Cadres in charge of the political indoctrination of young officers. Holban admitted that he was promoted for political reasons, writing:

the more I integrate into military life and activity, the more I realize that my knowledge in this area is clearly insufficient for the functions I perform. (Note: "plus je m’intègre dans la vie et dans l’activité militaires, plus je prends conscience du fait que mes connaissances en la matière sont nettement insuffisantes pour la fonction que j’exerce")

Holban attempted to publish a book in Bucharest about the role of Romanian Communists in the French Resistance, but was unable to do so. Holban wrote about his inability to publish his book:

After my return to Romania, when the facts were still strongly remembered, I had started to put the story down in writing. But the timing was wrong, as I soon noticed. The Resistance in France? Who would have dared to publish such a book and defy the official line, which demanded to ignore everything that was not the Soviet Union, the Red Army, the people's democracies? It was the start of the Cold War and the Resistance in France, even that of the Communists, was plagued with a double flaw: having taken place in an 'imperialist' country and having had former volunteers from Spain as protagonists, Jews, in other words 'cosmopolitan' elements". (Note: "Après mon retour en Roumanie, alors que les faits étaient encore fortement présents à la mémoire, j’avais commencé à en coucher le récit par écrit. Mais le moment était mal venu, comme je n’ai pas tardé à m’en apercevoir. La Résistance en France? Qui aurait osé publier un tel ouvrage et braver la ligne officielle, qui exigeait d’ignorer tout ce qui n’était pas l’Union soviétique, l’Armée rouge, les démocraties populaires? C’était le début de la guerre froide et la Résistance en France, même celle des communistes, était affublée d’une double tare: s’être déroulée dans un pays ‘impérialiste’ et avoir eu pour protagonistes des anciens volontaires d’Espagne, des Juifs, autant dire des éléments "cosmopolites"")

The Securitate file on Holban stated he was unsatisfactory from the party's viewpoint, maintaining that he was too fond of luxury and hunting and preferred the company of Romanian Army officers who were not party members, leading to him to being ousted after less than six months as a general. Holban recalled the atmosphere:

In 1950, we are in the middle of the cold war. In the middle of a witch hunt too. We see Titoists, traitors, spies. Major trials are in preparation. (Note: "En 1950, nous sommes en pleine guerre froide. En pleine chasse aux sorcières aussi. On voit des titoistes, des traîtres, des espions. De grands procès sont en préparation")

Falling victim to a political purge in 1950, Holban was dishonorably discharged from the Romanian Army and demoted down to a factory worker, working until his retirement in 1970. Holban made the mistake of talking at length to a group of Romanian-American Communists from Detroit who were visiting Bucharest in early 1950, which led to the accusation that he was an American spy.

In May 1952, the Foreign Minister Anna Pauker was ousted on orders from Joseph Stalin. In a reversal of the usual pattern in Eastern Europe, the downfall of Pauker marked the triumph of the "home communist" faction (i.e. those Communists who lived in Romania) led by Gheorghe Gheorghiu-Dej over the "Muscovite" faction (i.e. those Communists who lived in exile in Moscow) led by Pauker. The triumph of Georghiu-Dej led to a purge of those Communists who lived abroad with those who fought in the Spanish Civil War and/or with the French Resistance being especially suspect. The Securitate investigated Holban as a possible spy. The British historian Gavin Bowd wrote the people informing on Holban for the Securitate seemed to be looking desperately for some evidence that he was a spy, citing one report from an informer that read: "He goes to a doctor specialising in venereal diseases and syphilis. We believe that the objective is ill, because he bought medication. From the filatura it emerges that he has visited various shops for food and hunting equipment and always looks at himself in the window. Habitually, he lunches at a new restaurant called The Hunter. It is the most luxurious and expensive restaurant in Bucharest". On 25 December 1952, the Securitate investigation was closed under the comment written in his file: "nothing has emerged from this investigation except the fact that he meets lots of women".

Under Nicolae Ceaușescu, Romania started to take a more independent line from the Soviet Union, and his regime reached out to the France of Charles de Gaulle, who in a similar fashion wanted the states of western Europe and especially his nation to take a more independent line from the United States. De Gaulle favored the idea of a European "third force" in the Cold War that would be equally independent of both superpowers, a vision that fitted in with Ceaușescu's vision of Romania's role in the Cold War. In 1968, de Gaulle visited Bucharest, where he praised Ceaușescu as a great world leader. For Ceaușescu, the Romanians who served in the French Resistance were useful for him, and in 1965 three veterans of the Resistance were appointed to the Central Committee of the PCR. In 1969, a book entitled Roumains de la Résistance française (Romanians of the French Resistance) was published in Paris with one chapter written by Holban. Holban's chapter was very selective in its treatment of the facts with the groupe Manouchian being portrayed as betrayed by an unnamed provocateur and it was wrongly stated that it was the Gestapo that arrested the groupe Manouchian instead of the French police. However, after de Gaulle resigned in 1969 and the French idea of a European "third force" fizzled out, Ceaușescu lost interest in the subject of the Romanians in the French resistance, whom became suspect again for having spent the war years abroad.

In August 1979, Holban returned to Paris for the first time since 1946 to take part in the celebrations marking the 35th anniversary of the Liberation of Paris, where he posted for photographs with Henri Rol-Tanguy, the Communist leader who ordered the revolt of 19 August 1944. In September 1979, he was of the three representatives of the Amicale des Juifs anciens résistants who relit the flame at the Arc de Triomphe. During his trip to Paris, he read a number of books about the Resistance, where he noted sourly "les historiens ou écrivains qui traitent de la Résistance passent sous silence la contribution et le rôle des immigrés" ("historians or writers who deal with the Resistance ignore the contribution and role of immigrants"). The fact that French historians mostly ignored the role of immigrants in the Resistance was closely related to how the Resistance was remembered in France. The narrative promoted by Charles de Gaulle starting in 1944 was of la France la résistante, that France was a "nation in arms", with almost the entirety of the French people united together in the Resistance from the beginning of the occupation to its end with the notable exception of a few loathsome traitors. The American historian Patrick Young noted:

"The images and stories surrounding the Resistance provided an updated foundation myth for the French republic, after its startling failure in 1939. Fully incorporated into the school curriculum and in official commemorative culture as part of the civic catechism, the Resistance became a vital shared reference point for the French. The elevation of Jean Moulin as the transcendent figure of resistance--culminating in the solemn transfer of his remains to the Pantheon in 1964--was particularly emblematic of this myth-making impulse in post-war French political culture."

In this narrative with the Resistance being equated with Frenchness, foreigners had almost no place. The only exception was Manouchian and his group. In 1955, the poet Louis Aragon wrote the popular poem Strophes pour se souvenir, which was based on Manouchian's last letter to his wife, and which in turn was turned into a popular song of 1961, L'affiche rouge. Ever since Aragon's poem was published in 1955 with its claim that Mancouchian died for France, he and his group have been seen as French martyrs.

== L’Affaire Manouchian ==
In October 1984, he returned to France, where he lived as a stateless person until 1994. On 2 July 1985, a documentary by Mosco Boucault entitled Des terroristes à la retraite (Terrorists in Retirement) aired on French television. Des terroristes à la retraite portrayed Holban as a Communist terrorist and a Gestapo informer, making him the center of a heated dispute known as l’Affaire Manouchian. With the historian Stéphane Courtois working as a consultant on the film, Des terroristes à la retraite depicted the PCF leadership as willing to use the groupe Manouchian cynically to achieve their own ends. Prompted by Manouchian's widow, Mélinée Manouchian, it was alleged that Holban had betrayed Manouchian and the rest of his group to the French police in November 1943. Des terroristes à la retraite had first screened at the Cannes Film Festival in May 1983, was shelved as no distributor was interested in the film, and was first aired for a general viewing on Antenne 2 television station on 2 June 1985. Des terroristes à la retraite set a record in the ratings for a documentary, being watched by 29% of the French people when it first aired.

In Des terroristes à la retraite, Mélinée Manouchian spoke with great conviction as she named Holban as the man responsible for her husband's capture. She claimed that Holban not only refused Manouchian's request to leave Paris, but also threatened to have him executed as a deserter if he should leave without permission. The American historian Brett Bowles noted that Boucault gave a series of close-up shots of Mélinée Manouchian's face as she spoke with great passion and anguish, which was intended to inspire the viewers to sympathise with her. By contrast, Bowles noted that Boucault by shooting Holban from in a long shot as he watched video of Mélinée Manouchian's interview was intended to inspire viewers to dislike him. Bowles also noted that: "Dressed in a dark suit, tie, and tinted glasses, with a smoldering cigarette in his left hand and a lighter in his right, Holban looks like a cold, calculating crime boss from a noir gangster film rather than a heroic former resister." As Holban watched the video, he clenched his cigarette in quiet fury before forcefully taking a drag that caused his face to be briefly obscured by the smoke, giving a vaguely sinister impression which caused viewers to dislike him before he even spoke a word in rebuttal.

Bowles noted in the film that everything Holban says "smacks of duplicity". In his interview with Boucault, Holban spoke with great anger as he accused Manouchian of telling "nothing but fabrications" and called her "someone who was never active in the resistance...but who presents herself as a great source of knowledge and chooses...me as a scapegoat". Bowles noted in contrast to the sympathetic tone that Boucault interviewed Mélinée Manouchian, there was an accusatory tone to his interview with Holban as he asked leading questions that suggested Holban was responsible for Manouchian's capture and execution, much to the visible irritation of the latter. In turn, the defensive tone of Holban's answers to Boucalt's questions seemed to imply to the viewers that he was guilty of something.

When Holban was interviewed by a journalist from the Communist newspaper, L’Humanité, Jean-Pierre Ravery, about the film, Holban stated:

He asks me in a friendly, but emphatic manner, to speak out publicly against the programming of the film and thus to accompany other "protests". Despite some reservations I had, after watching the film I found it nonetheless welcome, if only to contradict the legend that the Jews allowed themselves to be taken like sheep into the crematoria. For this reason and also because in my eyes it was no longer a debate, but a settling of scores and political quarrels, I refused to get involved"). The PCF reacted with fury to Holban's neutrality with regards to Des terroristes à la retraite, and chose to condemn him. (Note: "Il me demande amicalement, mais avec insistance, de me prononcer publiquement contre la programmation du film et d’accompagner ainsi d’autres ‘protestations’. Malgré quelques réserves que j’avais, après avoir visionné le film j’ai trouvé qu’il était néanmoins bien venu, ne fût-ce que pour contredire la légende selon laquelle les Juifs se seraient laissé emmener comme des moutons dans les fours crématoires. Pour cette raison et aussi parce qu’à mes yeux il ne s’agissait plus d’un débat, mais d’un règlement de comptes et de querelles politiques, j’avais refusé de m’en mêler")

On 15 June 1985, Ravery in a front-page story in L’Humanité accused "Roger" (one of the aliases used by Holban) as being the man who betrayed Manouchian. On 28 June 1985, the Communist weekly newspaper La Voix de l’Est ran an article that accused "un certain Olivier" ("a certain Oliver"-another of Holban's aliases) as having exaggerated his role in the resistance.

L’Affaire Manouchian prompted much controversy at the time, all the more as the PCF disawoved Holban and put the blame for the arrest of groupe Monouchian on him, inspiring Holban to start writing his memoirs in response to defend his reputation. From the right, in the 1986 book L’Affaire Manouchian by Philippe Robrieux, it was alleged that Holban was part of an "ultra-secret special apparatus" within the PCF that answered only to the Kremlin and that Holban had betrayed the groupe Manouchian on orders from Moscow. From the left, a surviving member of groupe Manouchian and a PCF member, Arsène Tchakarian, blamed Holban for the betrayal of the group in his 1986 book Les Francs-tireurs de l'affiche rouge. Seeking to vindicate his reputation, Holban let himself be interviewed by the journalist Alexandre Adler from the Socialist newspaper Le Matin. Adler took up Holban's cause in a series of articles, arguing that he was leading a band of maquis guerillas in the forests of the Ardennes in the fall of 1943, and had not been in Paris for quite some time when the groupe Manouchian was arrested. Adler is the son of German Jewish Holocaust survivors and felt a strong kinship with Holban, who like him was an "outsider" in France.

Adler wrote about Holban:

We are far, as we can see, from the secret service novel we are being served today. He is not coming out of retirement today because he is seriously questioned: Mélinée Manouchian accuses him of having indirectly caused the death of her husband and his comrades, by sending them the order to remain on site in Paris when they knew they were threatened with imminent arrest. Let us observe immediately that this order, if it had been transmitted, would not have come from the brain of Holban himself, who was directly subordinate to the military committee of the FTP. (Note: "On est loin, on le voit, du roman de services secrets qu’on nous sert aujourd’hui. Il ne sort aujourd’hui de sa retraite parce qu’il est mis gravement en cause : Mélinée Manouchian l’accuse d’avoir indirectement provoqué la mort de son époux et de ses camarades, en leur transmettant l’ordre de rester sur place à Paris alors que ceux-ci se savaient menacés d’une arrestation imminente. Observons tout de suite que cet ordre, s’il avait été transmis, ne serait pas issu du cerveau de Holban lui-même, qui était directement subordonné au comité militaire des FTP")

Adler noted:

In August–September 1943, Boris Holban (‘Roger’) found himself at odds with the new urban guerrilla tactics advocated by his leaders. He finds them essentially, and rightly so, too costly in men, too adventurous. He is then relieved of his duties by his officials and removed from the action. (Note: "En août-septembre 1943, Boris Holban (‘Roger’ ) se trouve en désaccord avec la nouvelle tactique de guérilla urbaine prônée par ses chefs. Il la trouve essentiellement, à juste titre, trop coûteuse en hommes, trop aventureuse. Il est alors relevé de ses fonctions par ses responsables et éloigné de l’action")

Adler concluded his article of 17 June 1985 Exclusif: Boris Holban parle that:

This painful affair, if any, has left many wounds intact to this day. There is also the awareness of the exclusion of the vast majority of Jewish cadres of the communist resistance, in the USSR and in the popular democracies, the relegation of their epic for many years even by the PCF itself. (Note: "Cette affaire douloureuse, s’il en est, a laissé encore aujourd’hui bien des blessures intactes. Il s’y mêle la conscience d’une mise à l’écart de l’immense majorité des cadres juifs de la résistance communiste, en URSS et dans les démocraties populaires, la rélégation de leur épopée pendant bien des années par le PCF lui-même")

Holban's version was supported by an article published by his intelligence chief Cristina Luca Boico in the January 1980 edition of the Romanian journal Magazin istoric, where she mentions that Holban was in the Ardennes in November 1943 and had not been in Paris since September 1943. When Boico defected to France in 1987, she confirmed the account, saying that Holban had not been in contact with Manouchian or any members of his group for some time when they were arrested.

Another member of the FTP-MOI, the Franco-Polish communist Adam Rayski came to the defense of Holban, stating that the man who betrayed Manouchian was Davidowicz. Gheorghe Gaston Marin, a Romanian who served in the FTP-MOI and went on to become a cabinet minister in Communist Romania defended Holban. Gaston Marin in his 2000 book În serviciul României lui Gheorghiu-Dej Însemnari din viața attacked the thesis of Courtois and Boucault, writing: "It is asserted or suggested that certain arrests of MOI resisters were made thanks to French resisters. According to ‘witnesses’, the PCF broke relations with the MOI and dislocated in various regions MOI cadres with a view to paralysing their activity...The protagonists with such opinions do not know or forget the strict rules of illegality, the necessity to break links in order to prevent, via filature, the pursuit and fall of a part of or all of an organisation. The absence of Boris Holban from the leadership of the FTP-MOI in the Paris region, during a period when he asked to be moved to another region, has been used in a wide press, television and cinema campaign to tarnish this hero of the Resistance, making him responsible for the fall and execution of the Groupe Manouchian, when the culprit was the traitor Davidowicz, condemned and executed by the Resistance."

The British historian Robert Gildea wrote that regardless of the details of l’Affaire Manouchian that the controversy improved the popular understanding of the resistance as it was revealed that many of the resistance acts that had been credited to the FTP were in fact the work of the FTP-MOI. Gildea wrote that the men and women who served in the FTP-MOI were all immigrants to France, and many of them were illegal immigrants who lived on the margins of French society, but they all chose to risk their lives for France, making it an improvement in the public understanding of the past that there was greater attention paid to people whose actions had been mostly ignored until then.

In 1989, Holban published his memoirs Testament in Paris, which was critical of many of the decisions taken by the French Communist leaders during the war while seeking to rebut allegations of being a Gestapo informer. Holban concluded his book:

Fortunately, I am in France today and can express myself freely on this subject. If I had been in this heinous campaign in Romania, not only could I not have answered, but I would have been treated like a plague victim. This is the main reason why I decided not to go back there anymore. (Note: "Heureusement que je me trouve aujourd’hui en France et que je peux m’exprimer librement sur ce sujet. Si je m’étais trouvé pendant cette odieuse campagne en Roumanie, non seulement je n’aurais pu répondre, mais j’aurais été traité comme un pestiféré. C’est d’ailleurs la principale raison pour laquelle j’ai décidé ne plus y retourner")

In 1989, the book Le Sang de l'étranger by Stéphane Courtois (who had changed his opinion about Holban since 1985), Adam Rayski and Denis Peschanski cleared Holban of the allegations made by Boucault that he was a Gestapo informer. On 8 May 1994, in a ceremony performed under the Arc de Triomphe, President François Mitterrand awarded Holban French citizenship together with the Legion of Honor. During the ceremony, Holban talked much with Mitterrand about Sister Hélène Studler who also assisted Mitterrand during the war. In the 2009 novel Missak by Didier Daeninckx, Holban appears as the character Boris Bruhman. In Missak set in 1955, a French journalist named Dragère investigates who betrayed Manouchian in 1943 and discovers that Bruhman was the informer. However, in an interview on 17 October 2010, Daeninckx rejected the thesis he put forward in his novel, saying:

I could never have thought, like Mélinée Manouchian, that he was involved in the fall of Missak. His political police record leaves little doubt about this. If they had had any evidence of such a responsibility, it would have been used. For my part, I think that Mélinée Manouchian was intoxicated and that an operation to delegitimize the PCF-Manouchian report was undertaken in the early 1980s. (Note: "Je n’ai jamais pu penser, comme Mélinée Manouchian, qu’il était impliqué dans la chute de Missak. Son dossier de la police politique livre le peu de doutes qu’il y avait à ce sujet. S’ils avaient eu le moindre élément sur une telle responsabilité, il en aurait été fait usage. Je pense, pour ma part, que Mélinée Manouchian a été intoxiquée et qu’une opération de délégitimation du rapport PCF-Manouchian a été entreprise au début des années 80")

Bowd wrote that the allegations that Holban was the informer were "discredited" by the opening of the French police records in the 1990s, which revealed that Davidowicz was the one who betrayed Manouchian, just as Holban had been maintaining all the long. Bowd wrote that it was the "huge, meticulous filature" of the French police that broke the FTP-MOI as the French detectives of Brigade spéciale 2 methodically tracked down the groupe Manouchian over the course of 1943. Bowd charged that much of the effort to paint Holban as an informer seemed to stem from embarrassment in France over the fact that it was French policemen who hunted down the FTP-MOI rather than the Gestapo, and the attacks on Holban seemed to be an attempt to distract attention from the role of Brigade spéciale 2 by making the villain of the story a foreigner. The fact that Davidowicz broke under torture made him an unsatisfactory villain, and furthermore it was French policemen who tortured him. Bowd wrote there was a tendency in France to present all resistance in France as the work of the French, and even those foreigners who were résistants such as Manouchian are portrayed as motivated by French patriotism, even through there is no evidence of this; Manouchian in last letters before his execution wrote only about being motivated by Communism. Bowd argued that as was often the case with quarrels between French intellectuals that there was more at stake than the ostensible facts of the case; in this case, it was an attempt to promote an idea of resistance as being the same as Frenchness, which in turn reflected broader concerns that mondialisation (globalisation) was eroding a sense of French national identity.

== Books by Holban ==
- Testament Après quarante-cinq ans de silence, le chef militaire des FTP-MOI de Paris parle, Calmann-Lévy, Paris, 1989, ISBN 978-2702117781
- Hélène Studler, la passeuse de liberté; la vie héroïque d'une religieuse, grande patriote et grande résistante messine, Gérard Klopp Editeur, 1999, ISBN 9782911992353,

== Books and articles ==
- Bowd, Gavin (2009). La France et la Roumanie communiste. Paris: Editions L'Harmattan. ISBN 9782296215863.
- Bowd, Gavin (December 2014). "Romanians of the French Resistance". French History. 28 (4): 541–559. doi:10.1093/fh/cru080. hdl:10023/9636.
- Bowles, Brett (2011). "Historiography, Memory, and the Politics of Form in Mosco Boucault's Terrorists in Retirement". In Sandra Ott (ed.). War, Exile, Justice, and Everyday Life, 1936–1946. Reno: University of Nevada. pp. 191–224. ISBN 978-1-935709-09-1.
- Crowdy, Terry (2007). French Resistance Fighter: France's Secret Army. Oxford: Osprey Publishing. ISBN 978-1-84603-076-5.
- Cobb, Matthew (2009). The Resistance The French Fight Against the Nazis. London: Simon & Schuster UK. ISBN 9781847371232.
- Drake, David (2015). Paris at War 1939-1944. Cambridge: Harvard University Press. ISBN 9780674495913.
- Gildea, Robert (2015). Fighters in the Shadows A New History of the French Resistance. Cambridge: Harvard University Press. ISBN 9780674286108.
- Holban, Boris (1989). Testament. Paris: Calmann-Levy. ISBN 978-2702117781.
- Poznanski, Renée (2001). Jews in France During World War II. Waltham: Brandeis University Press. ISBN 9780874518962.
- Poznanski, Renée (1998). "Women in the French-Jewish Underground: Shield-Bearers of the Resistance?". Women in the Holocaust. New Haven: Yale University Press. pp. 234–252. ISBN 9780300080803.
- Ousby, Ian (2000) [1999]. Occupation: The Ordeal of France, 1940–1944. New York: Cooper Square Press. ISBN 978-0712665131.
- Rayski, Adam (2015). The Choice of the Jews Under Vichy Between Submission and Resistance. Notre Dame: University of Notre Dame Press. ISBN 9780268091835.
- Tismaneanu, Vladimir (2003). Stalinism for All Seasons A Political History of Romanian Communism. Los Angeles: University of California Press. ISBN 9780520237476.
- Young, Patrick (March 2001). "Review of Des Terroristes à la retrait". H-France Review. 1 (5): 20–24.
