= Des terroristes à la retraite =

- Directed by: Mosco Boucault
- Produced by: Evelyne July
- Cinematography: Guy-Auguste Boléat; François Catonné; Guy Chanel; Jean Orjollet; Philippe Rousselot; Eduardo Serra; Carlo Varini
- Edited by: Christiane Lehérissey; Chantal Rémy
- Music by: Benoît Charvet; Jean Schwarz
- Release date: 2 July 1985
- Running time: 84 minutes
- Country: France
- Language: French

Des terroristes à la retraite (Terrorists in retirement) is a 1985 French documentary film about the FTP-MOI, a sub-group of the Francs-tireurs et partisans (FTP) organization, a component of the French Resistance during the German military administration in occupied France during World War II. It was written and directed by Mosco Boucault.

The film premiered at the Cannes Film Festival in 1983 and provoked a heated controversy in France which resulted in the film not being broadcast on French television until 1985. The controversy was primarily caused by the film’s thesis that the capture and execution by the Gestapo of members of the FTP-MOIs Manouchian group (groupe Manouchian), including the group's leader Missak Manouchian, was facilitated by the leadership of the French Communist Party.

== Background ==
Boucault was born as Moshe Levy into a Jewish family in Bulgaria in 1951. In 1956 his family made the aliyah (Hebrew for "ascent") by immigrating to Israel. Following the death of his father in 1957, his mother moved the family to France, where he grew up and changed his name to the more French-sounding Mosco Boucault. As a teenager, he felt a profound identity crisis feeling not quite entirely either French or Jewish, and became obsessed with the story of the FTP-MOI resistance group as a way to bridge his two identities.

The PCF (Parti communiste français-French Communist Party) had maintained a trade union for immigrants called the MOI (Main-d'œuvre immigrée). In April 1942, a resistance group called the FTP-MOI (Francs-tireurs et partisans – main-d'œuvre immigrée) was founded, led by the Romanian Jewish immigrant Baruch Bruhman, better known by his alias Boris Holban. The FTP-MOI was made up of immigrants in general, but in some of its detachments such as its first battalion and second battalion about 90% of people serving in those units were Jewish immigrants from Eastern Europe. For the young Jewish men and women serving in the FTP-MOI, the Final Solution gave a desperation to their efforts, as not to go underground and resist would mean their extermination. The British historian Gawin Bowd wrote that the FTP-MOI: "...turned out to be the most courageous and deadly arm of the Communist resistance in the Paris area: as foreigners, and often Jews, they had little to lose in occupied France, while a long experience of clandestine activity and civil war had made them well-prepared."

However, not all who served in the FTP-MOI were Jewish. The second military commander of the FTP-MOI, Missak Manouchian, was an Armenian refugee from the Ottoman Empire who fled to France after surviving the Armenian genocide. Italian Communist refugees and Spanish Communist refugees were also well represented in the FTP-MOI. However, because of the disproportionate number of Polish, Hungarian and Romanian Jews serving in its ranks, the FTP-MOI is often considered to be the premier Jewish resistance group in France. The FTP-MOI was considered to be an elite force within the Communist resistance that was always assigned the most dangerous missions. At the time of the final mass arrests, the French police discovered that the FTP-MOI had members from Czechoslovakia, Poland, Italy, Spain, Hungary, Romania, Bulgaria and Armenia.

Though there was a tendency in France to ignore non-French contributions to the Resistance, the Affiche Rouge ("Red Poster") that appeared in massive numbers all over France starting on 21 February 1944, after the mass executions of the FTP-MOI members captured in November 1943, ensured the group always had a certain degree of fame in France. The Affiche Rouge appeared as both a poster and a pamphlet bearing the photographs of the executed men together with photographs of the wreckage left by their attacks such as derailed trains on a red background. The caption on the Affiche Rouge read: "Des Libérateurs? La Libération par l'Armée du Crime!" (Liberators? Liberation by the Army of Crime!"). The Affiche Rouge was intended by the German occupation authority to capitalize on fears in France that the victories of the Red Army on the Eastern Front would mean that France would be incorporated into the Soviet Union after the war and to depict the Resistance as the work of foreign-born Jewish Communists. The Affiche Rouge made a point of emphasizing that most of the men pictured were Jewish, and none were French. However, the intention of the Affice Rouge was foiled as ordinary people took to writing under the photographs "mort pour la France" ("died for France"), an expression traditionally used to describe those who were killed fighting for France. As a Jew from Eastern Europe, Boucault felt a strong affinity for the FTP-MOI. The Affiche Rouge was featured both in the film and on its poster. Boucault's mother had survived the occupation in France and had been forced to wear the yellow Star of David badge, inspiring her son with the desire to make a film that would "settle the score". The film was intended to portray Jews during the occupation not as passive victims as generally seen, but rather as active resisters who fought hard to avoid being exterminated.

== Production ==
After graduating from the Institut des Hautes Etudes Cinématographiques, Boucault set out to make a fictional film about a young man who discovers his father was executed during the war as a FTP-MOI member and that his family is Jewish, which was hidden by his mother to promote their assimilation into French society. However, the project developed into a documentary instead. With a grant from the Antenne 2 television channel and another grant from the French Ministry of Culture, Boucault contacted a veterans' group L’Union des Engagés Volontaires et Anciens Combattants Juifs and asked if he could interview their members about their wartime experiences. It was agreed that if Bocault was unable to find a distributor to release the film in the cinema theaters, his documentary would instead air on Antenne 2. To assist with the film, the historian Stéphane Courtois worked as a historical consultant. The actress Simone Signoret, who had been cast as the young man's mother, instead served as the film's narrator. The film was shot in 1982 with the intention of having it released in 1983.

== Thesis ==
The main thesis of the film is that the downfall of the groupe Manouchian led by the Armenian Communist Missak Manouchian in 1943 was engineered by the French Communist Party who betrayed them to the French police, and then sought to erase the existence of the FTP-MOI from the historical memory after the war. The British historian Gawin Bowd wrote that film presents the thesis that: "...Groupe Manouchian had been sacrificed, perhaps even betrayed, by a Communist leadership that was chauvinistic, even anti-Semitic, and prepared to spill foreign blood to present itself as the most active force in the French Resistance". The film's thesis made it the object of immense controversy both at the time and since.

== Synopsis ==
Boucault tells the story of the FTP-MOI via newsreel footage, voice-over narration, interviews with surviving members and reenactments. In France, there are two documentary styles. One associated with the filmmaker Claude Lanzmann in his 1985 documentary Shoah that involved interviewing people with no effort of the filmmaker to add anything extra into the film. The other type associated with the filmmaker Marcel Ophüls in his 1988 documentary Hotel Terminus: The Life and Times of Klaus Barbie involved not only interviews, but also newsreels, music, clips from other films, and the director himself who was arguably the "star" of the film as Ophüls had confrontational meetings as he tracked down various people who knew SS Hauptsturmführer Klaus Barbie in Europe and Latin America. Lanzmann was a partisan of the purist approach to documentaries as he argued that Ophüls's approach was diluting reality, criticism that Ophüls rejected.

The Affiche rouge is prominently featured in the film and in the posters promoting the film.

Boucault used a mixture of both approaches. About 85% of the film's eighty-two minutes running time consists of interviews with various former FTP-MOI members. Boucault called allowing people to speak at length the "magic of the documentary" that made it possible for “the witnesses [to] have time to breathe, to exist rather than being used simply as tools, a sentence here and there by way of illustration.” Three of the men interviewed, namely Jacques Farber, Louis Gronowski, and Adam Rayski were leaders of the FTP-MOI. In the film, Boucault tended to be much more sympathetic towards the foot soldiers of the FTP-MOI, presenting the men who planted the bombs and performed the assassinations in a positive light while presenting the leaders of the FTP-MOI in a more negative light.

The other four men interviewed, namely Ilex Beller, Charles Mitzflicker, Jean Lemberger and Raymond Kojitski were all Polish Jews who immigrated illegally to France in the 1930s and who served as FTP-MOI assassins. Beller spoke about having to walk for months via Czechoslovakia, Germany and Belgium to make his way to France. Mitzflicker stole away on a train and had to eat raw eggs to survive the five-day long trip from Warsaw to Paris. Lemberger was the constant victim of corrupt French policemen who knew that he was an illegal immigrant and forced him to pay extortion money to avoid being deported back to Poland. Beller, Mitzflicker, Kojitski and Lemberger were all working as tailors in 1980s France and all four men were still living in poverty, very much on the margins of French society just as they had been 50 years before. Kojitski worked 10 hours everyday as a tailor just to earn the small sum of 75 francs per day. Boucault filmed all four men at work, doing the tiresome work as tailors despite their age, partly to show their marginal status and partly as a metaphor for how all their stories come together just as they weave threads together.

Kojitski in his interview stated “if there were Nazis to rub out right now, I'd do it with pleasure, with no remorse”, saying he felt a "hatred that will never go away" because of his family being exterminated at Auschwitz. Beller, Lemberger and Mitzflicker all joined the FTP-MOI in 1942 and all admitted that they found it psychologically difficult to kill, saying the work of an assassin was not a job that they relished. Kojitski by contrast joined the FTP-MOI in 1944 to avenge his family, excelled at being an assassin as he stated he felt “great pleasure if some Germans were killed", and quickly rose up to become the commander of a FTP-MOI assassination squad. As Kojitski lists all of his family members who were exterminated, the camera focuses in on the steel needle of his sewing machine stabbing the cloth, which serves as a metaphor for his rage. Lemberger in his interview described in harrowing detail being arrested and tortured by the French police before finally being deported to Auschwitz. In his interview, Mitzflicker broke down in tears while working on his sewing machine, recalling that his mother, brother and sister were all exterminated at Auschwitz, saying: "I didn't do enough; I still shake, I didn't do enough." Unlike Kojitski, Mitzflicker was willing to forgive the Germans, saying "It wasn't the German people who did this to me; it was the Nazis."

Besides the interviews, Boucault had Mitzflicker and Lemberger reenact a mock assassination and a mock bombing with extras dressed as German soldiers serving as their opponents. The reenactments are intentionally humorous as the absurdity of two elderly men with a host of health problems posing as the vigorous and dangerous young assassins they once were are readily apparent. Both Mitzflicker and Lemberger joked while performing the mock assassination that they were not as good at this sort of work as they had once been. The mock assassination was a recreation of a real attack committed by Lemberger and Mitzflicker in 1943 at a restaurant at the Place Madeleine that was popular with Wehrmacht soldiers. The American historian Brett Bowles noted:

Despite their parodic dimension, the reenactments retain enough realism to impress upon spectators just how unglamorous, frightening, and risky a typical bombing attack actually was. The sight of two old men dressed in street clothes pantomiming their wartime exploits on a quiet Paris street forty years later thus ends up providing spectators a sense of how thoroughly crazy and genuinely heroic it was for two terrified teenagers armed with only an old revolver holding two bullets and a single homemade bomb, to take on the most powerful army in Europe. As Lemberger remarks, it was in effect a suicidal gesture, and yet the FTP-MOI repeated it literally hundreds of times at the risk of capture, torture, and deportation, followed by almost certain death. Lemberger himself barely escaped that fate, surviving internment at both Struthof and Auschwitz.

The reenactment of the attack on the restaurant at the Place Madeleine features music that evokes the retro mode films of the 1960s such as the popular 1969 film L’armée des ombres, which gave a glamorous, ultra-stylized picture of the Resistance. The actress Simone Signoret, who served as the film's narrator, specialized in playing the heroines of retro mode films, and the use of her voice as the narrator serves as a link between the films she starred in the 1960s and Des terroristes à la retraite. For many French people, Signoret was the archetypal résistante heroine on the account of the roles she played. The use of Signoret as the narrator and the type of moody background music associated with the retro mode style reminded a French audience of the bloody real events that inspired the retro mode films.

Bowles noted that the film is very androcentric in its approach as it largely ignores the role of women in the FTP-MOI, with the FTP-MOI intelligence chief Cristina Luca Boico being mentioned only once in passing despite the fact that she was the one responsible for gathering the information that allowed the men of the FTP-MOI to stage all their attacks. The film largely focuses on Mélinée Manouchian's domestic role as the wife of Missak Manouchian and ignores her own role as a résistante. Olga Bancic, who played a key role in obtaining and hiding weapons for the FTP-MOI, and for which she was gruesomely beheaded in Stuttgart, is not mentioned at all.

The only woman interviewed is Mélinée Manouchian, who accused Boris Holban of betraying her husband. Bowles noted that Boucault deploys a number of techniques intended to make the viewer like Manouchian and dislike Holban. In his interview with Manouchian, Boucalt features a series of close-up shots of her face, in which her anguish is quite visible while Holban in his interview is only shot in medium and long shots. Bowles noted that in the film: "Visually, Mélinée's appearance, body language, and the interview site all suggest generosity, candor, and truthfulness. Wearing a brown long sleeve sweater and flowered blouse open at the neck, she sits comfortably in the living room of her modest apartment on an overstuffed chair with legs uncrossed and looks directly into the camera as she speaks, occasionally pumping her hands for emphasis". Manouchian spoke at much length about her suffering during the war before she accused Holban of being the man responsible for her husband's arrest. By contrast, Bowles noted that in the interview with Holban, the latter is :"Dressed in a dark suit, tie, and tinted glasses, with a smoldering cigarette in his left hand and a lighter in his right, Holban looks like a cold, calculating crime boss from a noir gangster film rather than a heroic former resister." Before the interview with Holban began, Boucault played on his VCR his interview with Manouchian, which had the effect of angering Holban before the interview started. Holban smoldered with anger as he watched his television before taking a drag on his cigarette, causing his face to be obscured by the smoke, giving a vague impression of being someone sinister and malevolent before he even said a word in rebuttal. Boucault took on a sympathetic tone in his interview with Manouchian while he had an accusatory tone with Holban, which had a notable effect on the subjects of the interviews. Holban was clearly annoyed by Boucault's tone, which contributed to the defensive tone of his answers, which gave the impression that he had something to hide.

When Boucault interviewed Gronowski, Bocault stated "so they were sacrificed right?". Gronowski in response stated “in every war there are sacrifices”, words that are repeated again as Boucault offers up a frozen shot of his face to serve as a condemnation of Gronowski. Courtois in his interview with Boucault as the historical expert on the PCF stated: "From summer 1943 on, the Communist Party clearly sought to affirm its superiority within the resistance. To that end, and to reinforce its prestige, it had to have bombings and other armed attacks to publicize. In Paris there was only one group available to carry out such attacks: the foreign combatants. The party leadership had the option of keeping them safe or keeping them in the fight. That was what happened, and we can safely say that they were sacrificed to serve the higher interests of the party".

The journalist Philippe Ganier-Raymond in his interview stated: "The liberation is approaching, and what's going to happen? An army will emerge from the shadows with members named Boczov, Fingerewag, Della Negra, Glasz, Alfonso, and Elek. That cannot be allowed because the Communist Party has already decided to take a nationalistic, flag-waving tack. So names like Rol Tanguy, Colonel Fabien sound good, have a homey feel, make one think of Brittany. Perfect, the resistance will be French...On the other hand, these men from Central Europe, with their heavy accents, with their distinctive faces, from the moment they stopped receiving ammunition and money, they were left on their own and could do nothing but wander around and get caught". Boucalt offers on the screen the text of Manouchian's last letter to his wife, which is read out by Mélinée with the words "I forgive all those who have wronged me except for the one who betrayed us to save his own skin and those who sold us out" highlighted in red.

== Controversy ==
Des terroristes à la retraite had its premiere at the Cannes Film Festival in May 1983. No distributor was interested in picking up the rights for a theatrical release. The film was ignored except by the Communist newspaper L’Humanité which denounced the film for its unflattering picture of the PCF. Jacques Desgraupes, the director of programming for the state-owned Antenne 2 television channel, refused to allow Des terroristes à la retraite to be aired, saying the documentary was too controversial to air in France. In 1984, a group of French intellectuals led by Serge Klarsfeld and the actress Simone Signoret formed a committee to pressure Antenne 2 to air the film. On 1 March 1984, Ivan Levaï, the director of programming at the radio station Europe 1 gave a passionate speech on the radio, demanding that Des terroristes à la retraite be aired. Following the lobbying, the new programming director at Antenne 2, Jean-Claude Héberlé, announced that Des terroristes à la retraite would be aired on 2 June 1985. The announcement enraged the French Communist Party, which led a major campaign to have the “defamatory” film banned, which of course naturally increased public interest in having the film released. The PCF saw the film as a full frontal assault on its moral legitimacy as the self-proclaimed "le parti des 75 000 fusillés" ("the party of 75,000 shot" - a reference to the supposed number of French Communists shot under the occupation), and reacted with fury. The fact that the PCF was experiencing a loss of support in the 1980s made the Communists more anxious to hold on to their image as the most heroic Resistance fighters, and several Communist leaders seemed to have believed that the film was made with the intention of damaging their chances at the polls.

In response to the Communist campaign, Héberlé asked the authority for media regulation, La Haute Autorité de l’Audiovisuel, to assess the documentary to see if it was scholarly enough to be aired on French television. In turn, La Haute Autorité de l’Audiovisuel asked a "Jury of Honor" made of former members of the Resistance consisting of Henri Noguères, Raymond Aubrac, Lucie Aubrac, Claude Bourdet, and Pierre Sudreau to assess the film. The "Jury of Honor" in its report stated “though it is highly desirable that a film inform French of all generations about the saga of the FTP-MOI, such a film nevertheless still remains to be made”. The "Jury of Honor" labelled Des terroristes à la retraite "an operation of disinformation with obvious and shocking political intent". Lucie Aubrac called the film "misery loving". Sudreau referred to the recent Palestinian bombings of American and Israeli targets and stated: "At the very moment when we are again talking about direct action, this broadcast legitimizes terrorist methods.” Bourdet called the film "racist and anti-Semitic".

The conclusion of the committee set off an immense controversy with intellectuals on both the left and right calling for the film to be aired or banned. During the spring and summer of 1985, the dispute about whether the film should be aired or not developed into an affaire of the sort that required French intellectuals to weigh in with lengthy opinion pieces published in the newspapers. In response to the "Jury of Honor", the debut of the film was pushed back from 2 June to 2 July 1985. The American historian Patrick Young noted: "In the interim, vitriol continued to flow in the French press, with advocates of the film denouncing the delay as “censorship” and evidence of cowardice before the bullying of the PCF, and opponents of the film cataloguing its inaccuracies and denouncing its thinly veiled political agenda". The Haute Autorité stated that Des terroristes à la retraite should not be aired because: “the film does not meet the criteria of impartiality and balance commensurate with the mission of public broadcasting, or with regard to films of this type". However, with many complaining of the "Communist censorship", Héberlé announced that the film would be aired, to be followed up with a roundtable discussion of nine experts. The nine experts were Annette Kamieniecki and Roger Pannequin who served as the neutral mediators; Charles Lederman, Roger Bourderon, Henri Rol-Tanguy and Arsène Tchakarian who represented the Communists; Jacques Chaban-Delmas and Henri Amoureux who represented the Gaullists; and Christian Pineau who represented the Socialists. When Des terroristes à la retraite finally aired on 2 July 1985, it was watched by 29% of the people in France, setting a ratings record for a documentary in France. The discussion of the experts was highly rancorous with the four Communist members shouting at Kamieniecki and Pannequin while Chaban-Delmas ignored the film altogether as he used the discussion as a chance to promote Gaullism. Both Pineau and Amoureux sat in stunned silence during the discussion.

The film set off a heated controversy known in France as l’Affaire Manouchian about who betrayed Manouchian. Signoret as part of her research into Resistance heroines had befriended Lucie Aubrac, who served as the inspiration for the characters Signoret played in the retro mode films. The friendship between the two women ended over Des terroristes à la retraite, a film that Aubrac hated as much as Signoret loved it.

When Holban was interviewed by a journalist from the Communist newspaper, L’Humanité, Jean-Pierre Ravery, about the film, Holban stated:

He asks me in a friendly, but emphatic manner, to speak out publicly against the programming of the film and thus to accompany other "protests". Despite some reservations I had, after watching the film I found it nonetheless welcome, if only to contradict the legend that the Jews allowed themselves to be taken like sheep into the crematoria. For this reason and also because in my eyes it was no longer a debate, but a settling of scores and political quarrels, I refused to get involved. (Note: "Il me demande amicalement, mais avec insistance, de me prononcer publiquement contre la programmation du film et d’accompagner ainsi d’autres ‘protestations’. Malgré quelques réserves que j’avais, après avoir visionné le film j’ai trouvé qu’il était néanmoins bien venu, ne fût-ce que pour contredire la légende selon laquelle les Juifs se seraient laissé emmener comme des moutons dans les fours crématoires. Pour cette raison et aussi parce qu’à mes yeux il ne s’agissait plus d’un débat, mais d’un règlement de comptes et de querelles politiques, j’avais refusé de m’en mêler")

The PCF reacted with fury to Holban's neutrality with regards to Des terroristes à la retraite, and chose to condemn him. On 15 June 1985, Ravery in a front page story in L’Humanité accused "Roger" (one of the aliases used by Holban) as being the man who betrayed Manouchian. On 28 June 1985, the Communist weekly newspaper La Voix de l’Est ran an article that accused "un certain Olivier" ("a certain Oliver" - another of Holban's aliases) as having exaggerated his role in the resistance.

In the ensuing debate, Holban was attacked from both sides as the Communists from the left and various conservatives on the right chose to condemn him as the man who supposedly betrayed Manouchian. Adam Rayski, one of the FTP-MOI leaders defended Holban, arguing that the man who gave away Manouchian was Joseph Davidowicz, the political commissar to groupe Manouchian, whom Holban had executed on 28 December 1943. The debate caused by the film ultimately did much damage to the reputation of the PCF as it was revealed that many of the acts of Resistance credited to the FTP had in fact been the work of the FTP-MOI, which had been appropriated by the PCF to make the Communist Resistance appear more French.

Most of the controversy centered around the issue about the betrayal of Manouchian. However, the film also reflected a shift in the French memory of the past. The narrative promoted by Charles de Gaulle starting in 1944 was of la France la résistante, a "nation in arms", of almost the entirety of the French people united together in the Resistance from the beginning of the occupation to its end. Young noted: "The images and stories surrounding the Resistance provided an updated foundation myth for the French republic, after its startling failure in 1939. Fully incorporated into the school curriculum and in official commemorative culture as part of the civic catechism, the Resistance became a vital shared reference point for the French. The elevation of Jean Moulin as the transcendent figure of resistance--culminating in the solemn transfer of his remains to the Pantheon in 1964--was particularly emblematic of this myth-making impulse in post-war French political culture."

This "nation in arms" narrative first started to be challenged with the 1969 documentary Le Chagrin et la Pitié by Marcel Ophüls and the 1972 book Vichy France Old Guard and New Order by the American historian Robert Paxton. Young noted that Des terroristes à la retraite moved away from the ultra-heroic picture of the Resistance popular after the war to a "...more nuanced and in some ways more realistic depiction of the Resistance". Young wrote: "Boucault's film symptomizes the shift from a consensual, all-encompassing memory of the Resistance to more plural, perhaps more partial, even private ones". Des terroristes à la retraite came to symbolize what the French historian Henry Rousso in his 1987 book Le syndrome de Vichy called the "Jewish Memory" of the occupation, as beginning in the 1970s French Jews started to insist that their experience of the occupation as a people marked out for genocide was completely different from how the rest of the French experienced the occupation. The breakdown of the Gaullist "nation in arms" narrative starting about 1969 with Le Chagrin et la Pitié made it possible for what Rousso called the "Jewish Memory" to emerge as previously it had been insisted that almost all French people were more or less equally victims of the Third Reich. Boucault made a point of emphasizing the Jewishness of most of the people he interviewed, insisting the actions of FTP-MOI be understood as more of Jewish resistance rather than Communist resistance. In this regard, it was noteworthy that it was French Jewish groups that pressed the strongest to have Des terroristes à la retraite aired because it showed Jews "not simply going to slaughter, but actually fighting on behalf of liberty and the dignity of all men" as one French Jewish group put it in a press release. Young noted: "The assertion of a partial claim to memory, like the larger claim to specific or multiple identities (as opposed to being exclusively “French”) is of course always a problematic business in France". In France, plural identities are disapproved of as the expectation is that the only identity French people have is that of Frenchmen and Frenchwomen. In this regard, the picture of the résistants implicitly fighting more because they were Jews than because they were Frenchmen was controversial.

Des terroristes à la retraite almost single-handedly made the subject of Jewish resistance in France a matter of scholarly and popular interest. The first book ever devoted entirely to the subject of the FTP-MOI, Le sang de l’étranger co-written by Stéphane Courtois, Denis Peschanski and Adam Rayski was published in 1989. The allegation that Holban was the man who betrayed Manouchian has been discredited. Since the publication of Le sang de l’étranger, it has been accepted that it was "brutally efficient police work" by the Brigades spéciales that led to the mass arrests of FTP-MOI members in Paris in November 1943. However, it has been confirmed that Manouchian did ask for permission in 1943 to move his group out of Paris, saying the filture tactics of the Brigades spéciales were steadily closing in on the FTP-MOI, and was refused by Henri Rol-Tanguy, the military commander of the FTP. During the Cold War, the PCF was vulnerable to the charge that it had fought for the Soviet Union, not France. French anti-communists made much of the fact that the French Communists only started armed attacks after Operation Barbarossa began on 22 June 1941, leading the Comintern to order all Communist parties around the world to go all out against Nazi Germany. To counter this charge, the French Communists took an ultra-nationalist line during the Cold War, emphasizing the Frenchness of Communist Resistance, which led PCF to erase the memory of the FTP-MOI from its history. Bowles wrote that though Des terroristes à la retraite was wrong in claiming that the FTP-MOI was betrayed, the film was correct in claiming that the PCF chose to downplay the contributions of the FTP-MOI after the war to make the Communist Resistance appear as French as possible.

Such efforts were not limited to the Communists. Between 1941 and 1944, the Wehrmacht shot 1,014 résistants at Fort Mont-Valérien outside of Paris. Since 1960, ceremonies have been held at Fort Mont-Valérien every June 18 to honor those executed. It was not until 2003 that a memorial was put up at Fort Mont-Valérien listing all the names of those executed there. The reticence about listing the names was to hide the fact that the majority of those shot at Fort Mont-Valérien were foreigners. The British historian Nigel Saint credited Des terroristes à la retraite as being one of the works that helped lead to pressure to put up a memorial listing all the names of those shot at Fort Mont-Valérien. Saint also noted that the sculptor who put up the memorial at Fort Mont-Valérien, Pascal Convert, wrote an essay in L’Humanité in February 2004 that called Des terroristes à la retraite a "fabrication" of history. The British historian Robert Gildea wrote that Des terroristes à la retraite had done a service to history by highlighting a group that had been almost forgotten. One consequence of the new attention to the FTP-MOI was the discovery that the majority of the attacks on German forces in the Paris area between April 1942 and August 1944 were the work of the FTP-MOI, which had been ignored until then in order to make the Resistance appear more French.

Because of the controversy, the film has rarely been aired since its debut in 1985. Des terroristes à la retraite was released on DVD by Arte in 2013. It is also available to rent or download from the streaming service LaCinetek. Before then it was possible to rent the film on VHS from the New York Public Library. Gildea wrote the film has been overshadowed in the ensuing years by Shoah as most people preferred the image of Jews as passive victims rather than active resisters. Des terroristes à la retraite first played in the United States in April 1999 during a showing at the Museum of Modern Art in New York. The film finally had its debut in a cinema when it played in New York between January–March 2001. The film has played on French television only three times since 1985. The film was played on Arte on 4 July 2001 and again on 18 February 2004. Des terroristes à la retraite was last aired on French television on 11 February 2014, again on Arte, and has not been seen since.

On 28 September 2026, the film was added to Arte's YouTube channel.

== Reception ==
In a 2001 review, the American historian Patrick Young described Des terroristes à la retraite as one of the most controversial films ever released in France. Young praised Boucault for resisting "...the irresistible pull toward the mythic and heroic which had long circumscribed representation of the Resistance. It is as if he wishes to maintain this tension between the ordinary and the extraordinary, as a commentary upon the nature of Resistance heroism and of a heroism denied. This is not to say that Boucault wishes to question the heroism of Resistance activity. To the contrary, the patient accumulation of detail in the interviews has the effect of conferring the heroic mantle of resistance upon individuals long denied it." Young praised the film as being very successful in rebutting the picture of Jewish passivity during the Holocaust and of restoring agency to the Jewish communities of France during the occupation.

In a 2018 review, the French historian Denis Peschanski described the film as very moving, but "seriously defective" in its thesis that the PCF betrayed the FTP-MOI to the police. Peschanski charged that Boucault did not use any archives as sources, though he noted in fairness that the French police archives were closed to historians at the time. Peschanski wrote that much of the film's appeal was due to a highly damning picture of the PCF, which fitted in well with the climate of the 1980s, which made it difficult to have a "rational" discussion of the merits and demerits of the film. In the 1980s, the Soviet war in Afghanistan and the repression of the Solidarność union in Poland had made the Soviet Union very unpopular, and anything that made the pro-Soviet PCF appear in a negative light was welcomed in some quarters almost automatically. Likewise, the PCF's heavy-handed and bullying attempts to have the film banned guaranteed Boucault a degree of sympathy as the plucky underdog who made a film the Communists wanted to see banned. Peschanski noted that the freedom-of-speech question of whether the film should be banned or not was conflated with the question of whether the film's thesis was correct or not, which made discussing the film difficult. Peschanski noted that despite his rebuttal of the film's thesis in the 1989 book Le sang de l'étranger co-written with Rayski and Courtois, the film's portrayal of the PCF and Holban in particular as the ones who betrayed the FTP-MOI is still widely accepted. Peschanski wrote that regardless of Le sang de l'étranger which was based on research in the French police archives, that: "This has not prevented Boucault's films and its ideas from enjoying a certain success, especially in the United States. The limited impact of the specialists' testimony was humbling. All the same, even if we were quite alone in the mid-1980s since there were not many specialists on the subject, historians of the Dark Years in France were quick to support us".

== Legacy ==
The American writer Nancy Kricorian stated in 2007 that viewing the film during its run in New York in 2001 was a major inspiration for writing the book that ultimately became her 2013 novel All The Light There Was, set in an Armenian district in Paris during the occupation. Kricorian stated she found the story of Armenians and Jews banding together in a Resistance group quite interesting, which inspired her novel.

== Books and articles ==
- Bowd, Gavin (December 2014). "Romanians of the French Resistance". French History. 28 (4): 541–559. doi:10.1093/fh/cru080. hdl:10023/9636.
- Bowles, Brett (2011). "Historiography, Memory, and the Politics of Form in Mosco Boucault's Terrorists in Retirement". In Sandra Ott (ed.). War, Exile, Justice, and Everyday Life, 1936–1946. Reno: University of Nevada. pp. 191–224. ISBN 978-1-935709-09-1.
- Gildea, Robert (2015). Fighters in the Shadows A New History of the French Resistance. Cambridge: Harvard University Press. ISBN 9780674286108.
- Peschanski, Denis (2018). "Chance and Necessity". In Fransiska Louwagie, Manuel Bragança (ed.). Ego-histories of France and the Second World War Writing Vichy. New York: Springer. pp. 67–87. ISBN 9783319708607.
- Poznanski, Renée (2001). Jews in France During World War II. Waltham: Brandeis University Press. ISBN 9780874518962.
- Reid, Douglas (2009). Germaine Tillion, Lucie Aubrac, and the Politics of Memories of the French Resistance. Newcastle upon Tyne: Cambridge Scholars Publisher. ISBN 9781443807227.
- Saint, Nigel (2007). "Pascal Convert and the Family: History, Conflict and Creativity". In Edward Welch & Marie-Claire Barnet (ed.). Affaires de Famille The Family in Contemporary French Culture and Theory. Amsterdam: Rodopi. pp. 151–170. ISBN 9789042021709.
- Sweets, John (2003). "Jews and Non-Jews in France During the Second World War". In David Bankier and Israel Gutman (ed.). Nazi Europe and the Final Solution. Jerusalem: Yad Vashem. pp. 361–373. ISBN 9781845454104.
- Young, Patrick (March 2001). "Review of Des Terroristes à la retrait". H-France Review. 1 (5): 20–24.
- Vartanian, Hrag (2007). "Nancy Kricorian, Writer". In Huberta von Voss (ed.). Portraits of Hope Armenians in the Contemporary World. New York: Berghahn Books. pp. 99–103. ISBN 9781845452575.
