= Hélène Studler =

French Resistance activist (1891–1944)

Sister Hélène Studler
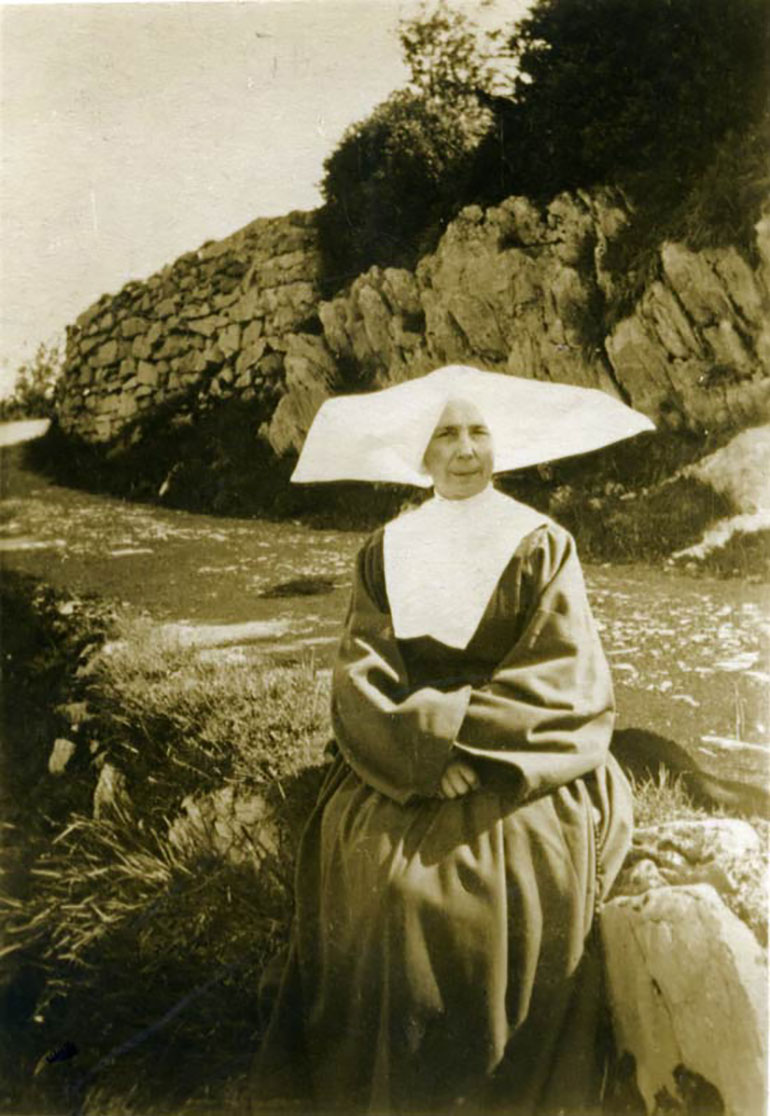
- Sister Hélène in 1944

Personal life
- Born: Marie Josèphine Studler; 8 March 1891 Amiens, France
- Died: 3 December 1944 (aged 53) Clermont-Ferrand, France
- Known for: Resistance activity and prisoner escape network during the Second World War
- Honours: Legion of Honour (Chevalier); Croix de guerre 1939–1945; Bronze Medal of Public Assistance [fr]

Religious life
- Religion: Catholic
- Institute: Daughters of Charity of Saint Vincent de Paul

Military service
- Website: Online archive, collated by the Studler family

Hélène Studler, known as Sister Hélène, born Marie Josèphine Studler (8 March 1891 – 3 December 1944) was a religious sister in the French Resistance who helped over two thousand prisoner-of-war escapees and fugitives evade the German authorities during the Second World War, among them François Mitterrand, Boris Holban, and General Henri Giraud.

Born into an émigré Alsatian family, Sister Hélène joined the Daughters of Charity of Saint Vincent de Paul in 1912. She was expelled from Metz, in Alsace–Lorraine, by the German authorities in 1914 and returned to the city in 1918, whereafter she worked at the Saint-Nicholas Hospice [fr]. During the Phoney War in 1939–1940, she retrieved personal items and liturgical objects from the evacuated French borderlands and visited soldiers confined to their bunkers.

Following the fall of France, Sister Hélène initially transported fugitives in the back of her Red Cross truck across the border between Moselle, which had been de facto annexed to Germany, and the occupied zone. From the end of summer 1940 to February 1942, she operated an escape network that took escapees across the border and directed them towards the zone libre, continuing her work despite being arrested in February 1941 and released in July for poor health.

In March 1942, she was forced to use her own escape network to reach Lyon, in the zone libre, where she recruited the guide that aided Giraud's escape from Königstein Fortress in April. Following the German and Italian invasion of the zone libre in November, Sister Hélène went into hiding in Clermont-Ferrand, where she died in 1944. She was awarded the Legion of Honour and Croix de guerre by Giraud on her deathbed. A statue was erected in her honour outside the Saint Nicholas Hospice in 1947, entitled Notre-Dame des Prisonniers (Our Lady of the Prisoners).

== Biography ==
Marie Josèphine Studler was born on 8 March 1891 in Amiens to an Alsatian family. Her father, originally from Sélestat, had emigrated from the region in 1871 in the aftermath of the German annexation of Alsace-Lorraine, in order to retain his French citizenship. Following the deaths of her parents, she joined the Daughters of Charity of Saint Vincent de Paul in 1912, taking the religious name Sister Hélène.

In 1914, Sister Hélène was expelled from Alsace–Lorraine, where she had been training novices at the Belletanche Seminary near Metz, along with other members of the clergy due to German concerns about their French patriotic influence. During the First World War, she was sent to Vitry-le-François where she cared for wounded soldiers. She returned to Metz in 1918 when the region was returned to France and was assigned to work at the Saint-Nicholas Hospice [fr]. In 1924, Sister Hélène was awarded the Bronze Medal of Public Assistance [fr] by the prefect of Moselle. She became well acquainted with General Henri Giraud, then the military governor of Metz, in 1936.

=== Second World War ===
At the outbreak of the Second World War, the northern part of Moselle between the border and the Maginot Line was evacuated. At her request, Sister Hélène was permitted by the military authorities to go to the region and retrieve items that had been abandoned, transporting them to Charentes using trucks whereafter they would be delivered back to their evacuated owners. She was also tasked with retrieving liturgical objects left in the churches and visited soldiers confined to their bunkers during the winter of 1939–1940.

In the aftermath of the fall of France in June 1940, Sister Hélène obtained authorisation from the German military authorities to help and treat the 30,000 French prisoners-of-war (POWs) held in camps around Metz. She appealed to the local population for supplies, receiving considerable donations, and on 14 July arranged for each French officer held in Metz to receive a good bottle of wine. That month she was approached by two French officers imprisoned in Montigny-lès-Metz and agreed to help them, with the hospice sheltering many fugitives that would move between safe houses on the way to the zone libre. When the camps were moved approximately 50 km (31 mi) away, Sister Hélène continued to deliver supplies to them without authorisation by bribing the guards and later extended her activity to camps within Germany. She was commissioned by the French Red Cross to visit and distribute supplies to the 40,000 POWs in labour camps around Trier and repatriated a number of sick prisoners under the Geneva Convention.

==== Prisoner escape network ====
As of October, the sisters of the Saint-Nicholas Hospice were delivering 100 kg (220 lb) of bread a day to the POW camps. Twice a week, and for several months, Sister Hélène clandestinely brought escapees to the Grands Moulins of Nancy [fr] in the back of her Red Cross truck, crossing the heavily guarded border between Moselle, which had been de facto annexed to Germany, and the occupied zone. She recruited smugglers to help fugitives cross the border and, to cope with the growing number under her protection, she entrusted some to friends, from the end of summer 1940 building a network that she managed from her office at the hospice. The network had to be reconstituted several times in the face of arrests and consisted of individuals from across French society: young girls in the Red Cross, the bourgeoisie, labourers, shopkeepers, white-collar workers, priests, and religious figures. Alongside escapees from the POW camps, the network also helped Wehrmacht draft dodgers from Lorraine and British airmen who had been shot down in the region.

In February 1941, Sister Hélène's name was found on an escaped prisoner of war and she was arrested, alongside her colleague Sister Cécile Thil. She was interrogated 18 times in three days and demanded a doctor. The Frenchman declared her ill with a contagious disease and had her transferred to the Bon-Secours Hospital [fr] in Metz. She was sentenced to a year in prison, but, shortly before she was to be sent to Saarbrücken, a German doctor found her too weak and she was released to a convalescence home on 7 July. (Note: Sister Cécile had been released on 7 June.) Sister Hélène returned to her office at the Saint-Nicholas Hospice soon after and resumed her activities in greater secrecy. On 15 December, she was contacted by a nurse that had sheltered then-Lieutenant François Mitterrand and taken him to Metz. That evening, Mitterrand rendezvoused with three other escapees and a member of Sister Hélène's network, who took them to meet a smuggler at Metz train station. The escapees and the smuggler boarded a train towards the border, bailing during a slowdown for roadworks, and crossed the border to Nancy where another member of Sister Hélène's network, a Brother of the Christian Schools, provided Mitterrand with false identity papers and directions to the zone libre. (Note: Pierre Péan notes that several accounts of the escape have circulated, with him selecting one that Mitterrand gave in 1947 and which was corrected in places by the nurse that had sheltered him.)

==== Escape to the zone libre ====
When the Gestapo learned of Sister Hélène's return, they sent three police officers to the hospice to arrest her. Sister Hélène answered the door, but the Gestapo officers didn't recognise her and she able to leave in civilian clothes after informing the Superior of the hospice, who subsequently received them and told the officers that she couldn't be found. On 6 March 1942, Sister Hélène turned to her own escape network and, trading her cornette and habit for civilian clothes and a handbag, she reached Lyon in the zone libre with the help of a Sudeten Czech customs officer. Upon arriving in Lyon, she was assigned to Saint-Joseph Hospital [fr] and frequented the centre for refugees from Lorraine. She continued to smuggle prisoners across the border, using more ad hoc methods due to increased police surveillance.

As of 1 April, the conspirators planning Giraud's escape from Königstein Fortress were yet to secure a guide that was to bring him false papers and civilian clothes and accompany him on his journey, with the date of the escape set for 17 April. By this time, Sister Hélène's reputation had spread and she was approached by Giraud's wife, Céline, and head of the Lyon Deuxième Bureau General François de Linarès. She examined the list of recent arrivals at the refugee centre and recognised the name of Roger Guerlach, a Reichswehr draft dodger from Moselle who had worked at the Saint-Nicolas Hospice. Sister Hélène found where Guerlach was living in Lyon and he was recruited by de Linarès to serve as the guide, with Giraud successfully reaching Lyon on 25 April. Through her friend Léon de Rosen, who was a delegate of the American Red Cross, she informed the Americans of Giraud's availability.

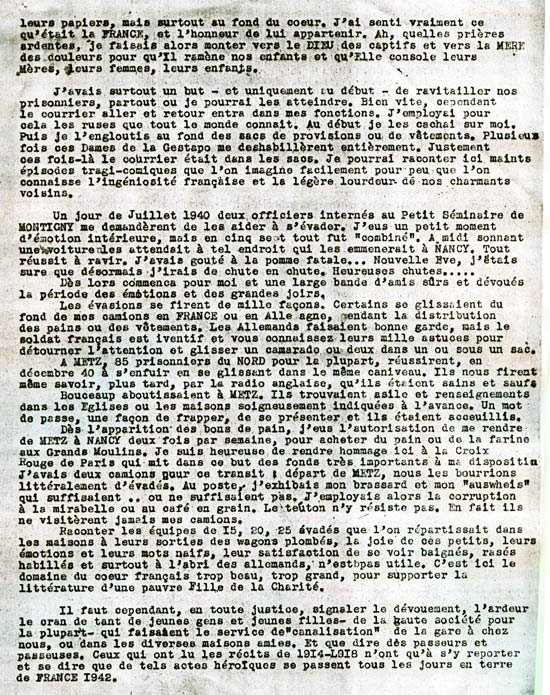
Sister Hélène's testimony

Following the German and Italian invasion of the zone libre in November and with her health deteriorating, Sister Hélène went into hiding at the Hôtel-Dieu in Clermont-Ferrand [fr]. Her nephew was arrested by the Gestapo in January 1943 and held as a hostage at Cherche-Midi prison, before being transferred to Saarbrucken in March. Unable to find her, the German authorities arrested the Superioress General of the Daughters of Charity Mother Laura Decq on 11 February. Sister Hélène was persuaded not to turn herself in and Mother Decq was released on 29 March, while her nephew was released in August. On learning of her ill health, Giraud visited Sister Hélène at the Hôtel-Dieu on 19 November 1944 to present her with the Legion of Honour and the Croix de guerre. Her citation to the order of the French and Allied armies [fr] read:

She was one of the essential elements of the Resistance and one of the pillars of the French cause in Lorraine. At the risk of her life, she enabled more than 2,000 French soldiers and many Lorrainers wanted by the police to escape from German prisons.

Sister Hélène died of cancer on 3 December in Clermont-Ferrand, aged 53.

== Commemoration ==
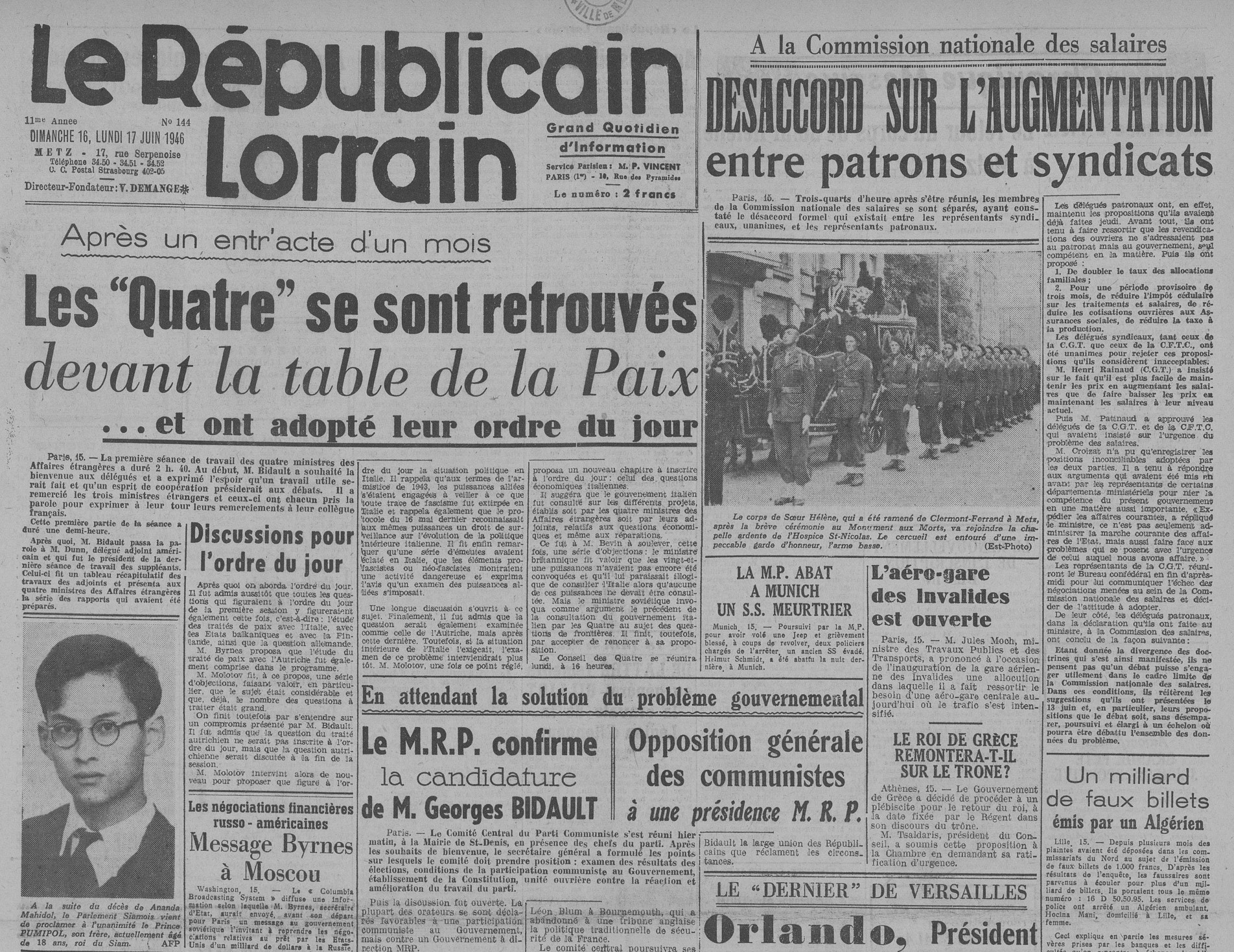
Front page of Le Républicain Lorrain on 16–17 June

After the war, Giraud organised the return of Sister Hélène's remains from Clermont-Ferrand to Belletanche convent cemetery in Metz on 17 June 1946 and, that summer, more than 100,000 people came to pay their respects. A statue of Notre-Dame des Prisonniers (Our Lady of the Prisoners) by a POW aided by Sister Hélène's network was erected in her honour outside the Saint Nicholas Hospice in 1947 and a small square in Metz was named after her in 1950.

Boris Holban, who escaped captivity due to Sister Hélène's network, dedicated a book to her in 1999, entitled Hélène Studer, la passeuse de liberté (Hélène Studer, The Smuggler of Freedom). In 2017, the Spanish film Red de libertad (The Network of Freedom) was released, based on her story.

== Legacy ==
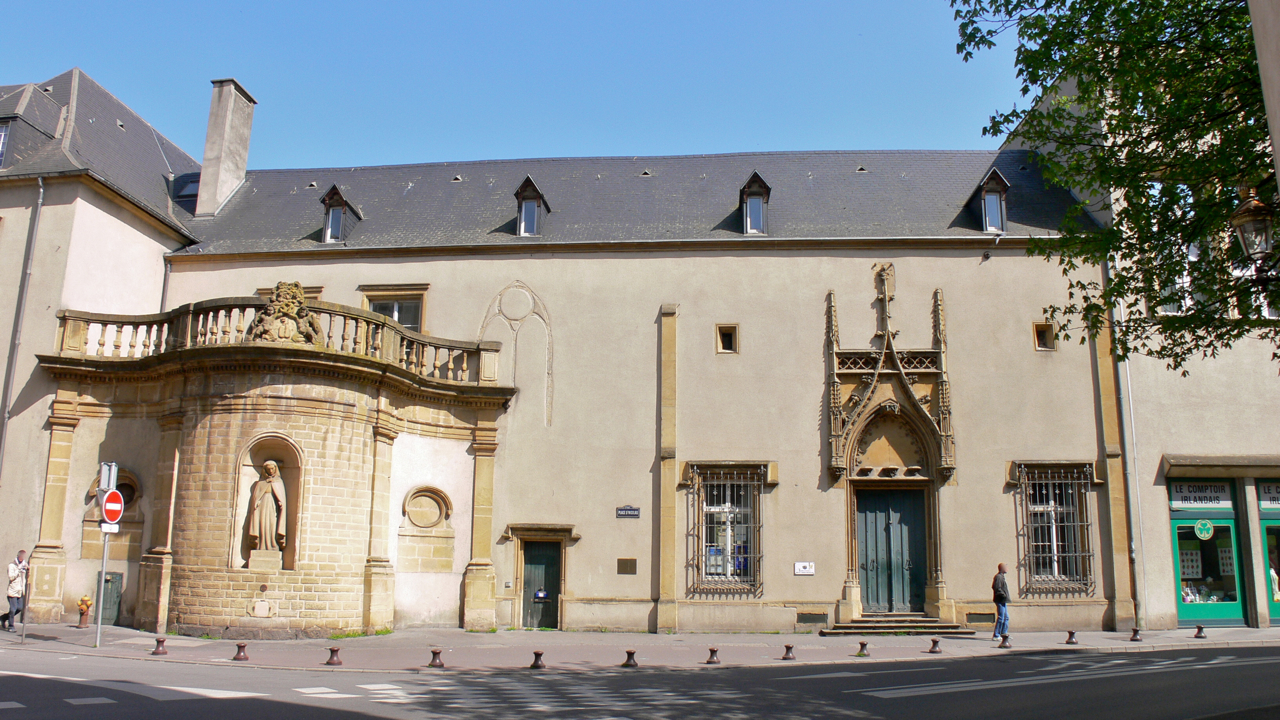
The Saint Nicholas Hospice in Metz. On the left is the Notre-Dame des Prisonniers statue.

The number of fugitives from the German authorities that used Sister Hélène's escape network has been estimated at over two thousand. The following is a list of notable escapees that were assisted by the network:

- François Mitterrand
- Boris Holban
- Marius Maziers
- Roger-Patrice Pelat
- Léon de Rosen

== Decorations ==
Knight of the Legion of Honour – 9 November 1944

Croix de guerre 1939–1945 (one palm) – 9 November 1944

Bronze Medal of Public Assistance – 18 August 1924

== Bibliography ==
- Beaudoin D.C., Martha (1989). "Notable Daughters of Charity (1): Sister Helene" (PDF). Vincentian Heritage Journal. 10 (1). DePaul University: 89–91.
- Chambe, René (15 April 1962). "Comment fur préparée l'évasion de Giraud" [How Giraud's escape was prepared]. Revue des Deux Mondes (in French): 503–526. JSTOR 44590610.
- Cointet, Michèle (2005). De Gaulle et Giraud: L'affrontement, 1942–1944 [De Gaulle and Giraud: The Confrontation, 1942–1944] (in French). Paris: Perrin. ISBN 978-228-601-260-1.
- Cointet, Michèle (2018). Les françaises dans la guerre et l'Occupation [French Women in the War and the Occupation] (in French). Paris: Fayard. ISBN 978-221-370-133-2.
- Lormier, Dominique (2023). Les combattantes de la liberté (1939–1945) [Women Freedom Fighters (1939–1945)] (in French). Paris: Alisio. ISBN 978-237-935-318-5.
- Michel, Anthony (2012). "Metz, Luxembourg-Ville: couverture médiatique comparée des cérémonies commémoratives de la Seconde Guerre mondiale" [Metz, Luxembourg City: Comparative media coverage of Second World War commemorative ceremonies] (PDF) (in French). PhD diss., University of Lorraine.
- Molette, Charles (1996). "Le rôle de "souers" de France durant la Second Guerre munduial" [The role of "sisters" of France during the Second World War] (PDF). Bulletin de l'association des archivistes de l'Eglise de France (in French) (45–46). Archives of the Church of France: 56–79.
- Péan, Pierre (1994). Une jeunesse française: François Mitterrand, 1934–1947 [A French Youth: François Mitterrand, 1934–1947]. Paris: Fayard. ISBN 978-221-364-460-8.
