= Parizer Haynt =

Parizer Haynt (Yiddish: פּאַריזער היינט - "Parisian Today") was a Yiddish-language newspaper published in Paris, France. The newspaper was established in 1923 and became a daily publication in 1926. It was the first daily Yiddish newspaper in Western Europe. Its founders and first editors were Shmuel Yatzkan and Noah Finkelstein, who had previously edited the Warsaw Yiddish newspaper Haynt. It was later edited by the journalist Vladimir Grossman (1884–1976). The paper was supportive of Zionism, in contrast to its primary rival, the Communist daily Naye Prese. Isaac Bashevis Singer contributed articles to the paper during the 1930s. Other authors who wrote for the paper include Aryeh Leib Grajewski, Aaron Alperin, and Nisn Frank. The newspaper's headquarters were at 34 rue Richer, in the 3rd arrondissement. It ceased publication in 1940.
