= Revolutionary Yiddishland =

Book by Alain Brossat and Sylvie Klingberg

Revolutionary Yiddishland: A History of Jewish Radicalism
- Cover of the English edition
- Author: Alain Brossat and Sylvia Klingberg
- Language: French
- Genre: History
- Published: 1st Edition 1983 (Ballard) (French) 2nd Edition 2009 (Éditions Syllepse) (French) English translation of the 2nd Edition 2016 (Verso Books)
- Publication place: France
- ISBN: 9782849502174

Revolutionary Yiddishland: A History of Jewish Radicalism (French: Le Yiddishland révolutionnaire) is a book written by Alain Brossat and Sylvie Klingberg about the history of Jews in leftist movements in the 20th century. First published in French in 1983, an English translation of the second edition was published by Verso Books in 2016.

== Publication history ==
Revolutionary Yiddishland was published in 1983 as Le Yiddishland révolutionnaire by the publication house Balland. A second edition, revised by David Forest, contained additional notes and references, as well as a new introduction by the Brossat and Kleinberg, and was published by Éditions Syllepse in 2009. This edition was translated to English by David Fernbach and published by Verso Books in 2016.

== Summary ==
The book chronicles the history of Jews in leftist political movements in Europe and Palestine in the 20th century, examining both the history of left-wing politics within Jewish communities and the history of Jews in the broader socialist and anti-fascist movements of the 20th century.

In particular, the book focuses on a few episodes of this history in roughly chronological order: the first two chapters document the emergence of socialist politics in Jewish communities in Eastern Europe against a backdrop of religious traditionalism, rapid industrialization, anti-Jewish violence sanctioned by the Russian Empire, and the Bolshevik Revolution which led to the fall of the Russian Empire and the establishment of the Soviet Union. The third chapter documents the history of Jews who volunteered in the International Brigades that fought in the Spanish Civil War, and the fourth chronicles Jewish resistance movements against the Holocaust during World War II. Chapter five breaks the chronological order of the book, going back to detail the mixed experiences of Jews in the Soviet Union from the 1920s to the 1950s, and a final chapter documents the history of the Communist Party of Palestine and the various roles of Jewish leftists alternately supporting the Zionist movement and the establishment of the state of Israel, or fighting against it as anti-Zionists.

Although Brossat and Klingberg are academics, Revolutionary Yiddishland is not an academic text, and openly sympathizes with the revolutionaries that comprise the book's focus. Largely, the book cleaves to a socialist, anti-Stalinist, anti-Zionist perspective.

== Reception ==
The English edition of the book met favorable reviews from left-wing publications. Critics praised the book's commitment to recording the biographies of activists and a collective history which would otherwise have disappeared from collective memory, while one writer argued the book included too nostalgic depictions of early Labor Zionism. In a 1988 review of the original French edition, a writer for Dissidences praised the book overall, while lamenting that it spends little time analyzing the history of libertarian socialist movements.

== See also ==
- Bundism
- Yevsektsiya
- History of the Jews in Europe
- Jewish Combat Organization
- Jewish Communist Party (Poalei Zion)
- Jewish political movements
- Judaism and politics
- Yiddishist movement
