= Naye Prese =

- Type: daily newspaper
- Ceased publication: 1993
- Political alignment: Communism
- Language: Yiddish
- Headquarters: Paris
- Country: France

Naye Prese (Yiddish: נײַע פּרעסע) was a Yiddish-language communist daily newspaper published in Paris, France. The first issue was published on January 1, 1934. The initiative to start publishing Naye Prese was taken by a sector of Jewish members of the French Communist Party. Prior to the founding of Naye Prese there had been other Yiddish-language communist periodicals which had been banned by the French state authorities.

Naye Prese was one of two daily Yiddish newspapers published in Paris during the interbellum period, the other being the pro-Zionist Parizer Haynt. Moreover, Naye Prese was the sole communist Yiddish daily in Europe at the time.

The Jewish membership of the French Communist Party was rather limited, numbering around 200–300 at the time of the founding of Naye Prese. But communist ideas had widespread support amongst the Jewish communities in France. Initially Naye Prese had a readership of around 10,000. Many of its readers were émigré Polish Jews, who had been militants of the Communist Party of Poland but had not joined the French Communist Party after settling down in France. In 1936, after an intensive election campaign of the French Communist Party amongst the Jewish communities and the formation of the Popular Front government, the readership reached 20,000.

Leo Katz served as the chief editor of Naye Prese, before joining into exile in Mexico.

Naye Prese was banned during the German occupation of France.

During the early 1950s, Naye Prese had a daily edition of 8,700. It was the largest of the three Yiddish left-wing dailies in Paris at the time. In the summer of 1951, French authorities ordered the deportation of the editor of Naye Prese, Jacob Gromb. Gromb, a Polish-Jewish immigrant who had become a French citizen in 1950, was charged by the authorities with not having 'assimilated enough' to French society. There were widespread protests against this decision, also outside of communist quarters. When the Gromb case was decided in court, the deportation order was revoked.

On November 7, 1969, the Friends of Naye Prese issued a statement, with the backdrop of the 1968 Polish political crisis, condemning antisemitic policies of the Polish government.

Naye Prese was closed down in 1993.

== Bibliography ==
In 1945, 20 yor naye prese 1934-1945 ('20 years of Naye Prese 1934-1945') was published.
