= Cristina Luca Boico =

Romanian communist activist

- Born: Bianca Marcusohn; 8 August 1916; Botoșani, Romania
- Died: 16 April 2002 (aged 85); Paris, France
- Other names: Cristina Luca, Cristina Boico
- Occupation: communist activist

Cristina Luca Boico (8 August 1916 – 16 April 2002) was a Romanian communist activist. After going into exile in France, she joined the French Resistance and worked in the intelligence service. At the end of the war, she returned to Romania and worked as the director of the Ministry of Education and numerous other governmental posts, until she was purged in 1952. Working as an editor for the Scientific Publishing House she later taught at the Politehnica University of Bucharest. In 1987, she left Romania to visit her children in Paris, refusing to return. For the remainder of her life, she gave lectures and published memoirs about the evolution of communism.

== Early life ==
Bianca Marcusohn was born on 8 August 1916 in Botoșani, Romania to Luisa (née Segal) and Isidor Marcusohn. Her family, which included an older sister, Hermina, belonged to the assimilated Jewish middle-class. Both she and her sister were deeply attached to Romanian culture and literature. The Kingdom of Romania was a deeply Francophile country as Romanian intellectuals embraced the idea of modelling the newly independent kingdom after France, Romania's "big Latin sister". Marcushon and her sister grew up reading French literature. After completing her secondary education at Carmen Sylva High School in Botoșani, Marcusohn moved to Bucharest to undertake medical studies. She later recalled about the Carmen Sylva school: "It was the nom de plume of Romania’s first queen, Elisabeth, the wife of Carol I. The school had an excellent national reputation. Teachers were selected among the very best, the discipline was severe. But it was in this high school that I had my first direct encounters with anti-Semitism... At the school, our teachers would have never made discriminatory or offensive statements-regardless of what they may have thought privately-but some girls with that family background maintained a certain distance from us". As an young woman, she was greatly influenced by the writings of the Romanian socialist Constantin Dobrogeanu-Gherea.

She joined the Students' Democratic Front, an organization aligned with the Romanian Communist Party and wrote articles for journals on the international anti-fascist movement. As a university student, she spent much at time at the Schuller, the dormitory set aside for Jewish students that was often attacked by anti-Semitic students. One student at the University of Bucharest remembered that many students spent "their time and energy in the absence of university sports on Jew-baiting or actual Jew-beating". In common with many other Jewish intellectuals in Eastern Europe, she was attracted to Communism because it promised to dissolve nationalities, religions and ethnicities, thereby rendering the "Jewish Question" moot as she recalled: "Communism promised a better world for all and, thereby, the genuine liberation of the Jewish people, allowing for a complete flourishing of its potential. Communism was supposed to bring about a democratic solution to the question of nationalities. Hardly anyone can imagine what it meant for us, young high school girls and boys". The Schuller was the center of much intellectual debate and discussion with the Jewish students mostly divided between the Communists who argued that only Communism could end antisemitism in Romania vs. the Zionists who argued that Romanian Jews should all leave for Palestine to establish a Jewish state there under the grounds there was no future for Jews in Romania.

In 1931, the ACSE (Asociațiile Generale ale Studeților Evrei-General Union of Jewish Students), which managed the Schuller, was taken over by members of the illegal Union of Communist Youth, and thereafter, the Communist tendency at the Schuller tended to dominate at the expense of the Zionists. She was a friend of Lucien Goldmann and was influenced by his ideas. Like Goldmann, she favored staying in Romania and supported the Communists against the Zionists. Goldmann often took part in the debates at the Schuller, taking a Marxist line while also venturing into more esoteric topics such as the impact of the theories of Einstein and Freud for Marxism and the understanding of human sexuality. Goldmann's theories, which were regarded as eccentric, brought him into conflict with the Stalinist Union of Communist Youth, which accused him of Trotskyism. In 1937, after being expelled for her political activities, Marcusohn left Romania to continue her studies at the Sorbonne. On 28 December 1937, King Carol II of Romania appointed Octavian Goga of the extreme right-wing National Christian Party as prime minister. During Goga's short period in office, he passed a flood of anti-Semitic laws, one of which was to strip Romanian Jews of their Romanian citizenship. At the approach of the Nazis, the university was closed and per a posted notice, she was allowed to graduate by taking her final tests at any university offering them. Marcusohn made her way to Toulouse, where she completed her examinations and received her certificate in Natural Sciences in June 1940.

== Career ==
Marcusohn began working in the marine biology laboratory of Édouard Chatton in Banyuls-sur-Mer, but by September had decided to return to Paris. Once there, she contacted the Romanian affiliates of the French Communist Party and reconnected with the communist movement. Taking in mathematics students, she worked as a tutor and was eventually offered a post with Georges Tessier to translate journal articles to French for researchers at the Caisse nationale de la recherche scientifique, forerunner to the French National Center for Scientific Research. She participated in the 1940 demonstrations to protest the arrest of Paul Langevin and was arrested but quickly released. The anti-Semitic laws threatened the Jewish community in France with destitution, and the burden of poverty fell especially hard on women, and the all more so on immigrant Jewish women. In France, there were two terms for Jews; namely the les Israélites to describe Jews who had embraced the French language and culture, which was a respectful and polite term, and les Juifs for those Jews who were seen as having failed to properly embrace the French language and culture, which had derogatory connotations. French Jews were usually described politely as Israélites while the more derogatory term les Juifs was reserved for Jewish immigrants, especially from Eastern Europe. The popular image in France at the time of Jewish immigrants from Eastern Europe was of a mass of illegal immigrants who lived in poverty, refused to assimilate and engaged in criminality; the fact that the number of Eastern European immigrants, and even more so of illegal immigrants was greatly exaggerated led to the perception that this was a major social problem. Marcusohn spoke fluent French, but as a stateless Jew from Romania, she was considered to be more of a Juif than an Israélite

In 1941, Marcusohn joined the Organisation Spéciale—Main-d'Œuvre Immigrée (OS-MOI), the armed group of the Immigrant Labor Force, using the name Monique as a disguise. She was recruited into underground work by Boris Holban. She lost her translating job in 1942 and went to work full time, spying for the FTP-MOI. From the summer of 1942 onward, it was widely understood within the French Jewish community that the "Final Solution to the Jewish Question" was not deportation to some vague utopian Jewish homeland in Eastern Europe as the Nazis were promising, but rather genocide, which gave a major impetus to Jewish resistance. Marchusohn recalled that once it was understood that the threat was now an existential one of extermination that many Jews embraced resistance as the issue was one of survival.

In 1942 when the OS-MOI merged with two other groups to form the Francs-Tireurs et Partisans—Main-d'Œuvre Immigrée (FTP-MOI), Marcusohn changed her name again, to Cristina Luca, and became and intelligence officer in the resistance. As the intelligence chief, she selected targets for resistance attacks and collected as much information as possible about the targets. The intelligence branch of the FTP-MOI was a largely female-dominated section, which reflected the prevailing assumptions that women were better suited for intelligence work while men were better suited for action. With the knowledge of her professors, Luca funneled stolen chemicals from the biology laboratory at the Sorbonne to the partisans. Between January-June 1943, the FTP-MOI staged 93 actions in Paris. In the first six months of 1943, the FTP-MOI were responsible for 14 train derailments, 34 acts of arson or bombings of buildings, and 43 assassinations in Paris. The FTP-MOI was regarded as an elite group within the FTP that was always assigned the most dangerous missions, which was seen as an honor.

She specialized in constructing Molotov cocktails, and as the intelligence chief of the FTP-MOI she played a key role in the investigation to find the informer who betrayed Missak Manouchian and his group in November 1943. Ultimately, her investigation exposed as the informer as Joseph Davidowicz, the political commissar to the groupe Manouchian, who was promptly killed. In 1944, she was assigned to combat duty for the entire north of France and participated in several partisan attacks. During the liberation of Paris between 19-25 August 1944, she took part in the revolt. Together with her fellow Romanian communists Holban, Gheorghe Vasilichi and Ion Marinescu, she led a group that seized the Romanian consulate and the Romanian tourist office in Paris, which was announced at the time as the first step towards the overthrow of the regime of the prime minister, Marshal Ion Antonescu. After the liberation, she joined the French Army as a lieutenant.

At the end of the war, Luca returned to Romania in March 1945. Between 1945 and 1947, she worked in the Ministry of Information and then went to Belgrade, Yugoslavia, where she worked at the Romanian embassy as a press-attaché for a year. During her time in Belgrade, she was a friend of Milovan Djilas, who at the time served as the vice-president of Yugoslavia and was Marshal Tito's right-hand man. Because of the Tito–Stalin Split, Luca was recalled to Romania and began working in the Ministry of Foreign Affairs, in charge of the press department. In 1949, she married Mihail Boico (born Rosner), a military officer in command of troops on the border. Shortly after the marriage, Stalin began targeting veterans of the Spanish Civil War and those who had been involved in the French Resistance, placing both Boico and her husband, who was known as Bibi, under suspicion. Besides for having served in the French Resistance, Boico's unwillingness to denounce Tito and her friendship with Djilas placed her under suspicion as a "Titoist"; only her friendship with the Foreign Minister Anna Pauker kept her safe from the Securitate. Pauker's downfall removed her principle patron and protector from within the PCR. Boico was dismissed from her job in June, 1952 and Bibi was purged from his position in the Interior Ministry that same fall. Boico was assigned to a minor position in the Grigore Antipa National Museum of Natural History.

Disillusioned by the party, after 1956, Boico no longer participated in political activities, concentrating instead on her work in history and science. In the 1960s, she began working as the editor of the Scientific Publishing House and later taught courses on Marxism at the Politehnica University of Bucharest. Publishing a few book introductions and journal articles, she increasingly found herself at odds with the regime of Nicolae Ceaușescu. By the 1970s, she considered Ceausescu's regime to be "fascist" as she was disgusted by the anti-intellecualism of the Ceausescu regime.

The American scholar Brett Bowles noted that the crucial role played by women in the Resistance has tended to be overlooked, giving the example of the 1985 French documentary Des terroristes à la retraite (Terrorists in Retirement) by Mosco Boucault about the FTP-MOI. Bowles noted that in the film, there was almost no mention of the women who served in the FTP-MOI and Boico, despite her key role as the FTP-MOI intelligence chief, was mentioned only once in passing. Buico was not interviewed for Des terroristes à la retraite; indeed the only woman interviewed in the film was Mélinée Manouchian and the interviews with her the focus was mostly on being the wife of Missak Manouchian instead of her role as a résistante.

In 1987, she left Romania to visit her children in Paris and chose not to return. She began publishing again in France and wrote such works as Les Hommes qui ont porté Ceaușescu au pouvoir, which has been called by Vladimir Tismăneanu "the most comprehensive and illuminating analysis" of the rise of Ceaușescu and Gheorghe Gheorghiu-Dej to the leadership of the Romanian Communist Party. Her major concern in the last years of her life was writing about the Holocaust in Romania and to rebut the attempts, which had started under the Ceaușescu regime in the 1970s, to portray Antonescu as a well meaning, but misguided Romanian patriot who was opposed to the Holocaust. She often advised the Holocaust Memorial Museum in Washington D.C about the subject. At the time of her death she was writing a memoir entitled Histoire d’une famille au XXème siècle Souvenirs et réflexions.

== Death and legacy ==
Boico died on 17 August 2002 in Paris. In 2009, the French novelist Didier Daeninckx published a novel Missak, where Luca Boico is mentioned several times as the book's hero, the journalist Dragère, seeks in 1955 to find out who betrayed Manouchian. In 2014, a French miniseries, Résistance, was released about the young people involved in the French Resistance during the war. One of the characters in the series was based on Boico's experiences and was played by Romanian actress Cristina Flutur.
