= Renée Poznanski =

Renée Poznanski (Hebrew: רנה פוזננסקי; born 26 April 1949 in Paris) is a French-born Israeli historian, specialist in the Holocaust, and the Jewish Resistance in France during the Second World War, who teaches at the Ben-Gurion University of the Negev, in Beersheba, in Israel.

== Works ==
- Renée Poznanski, Denis Peschanski, Drancy en France: de la Cité de la Muette au 'camp des Juifs', Paris, Fayard, 2015.
- Renée Poznanski (ed.), Jacques Biélinky, Journal 1940-1942. Un journaliste juif à Paris sous l’Occupation, Paris, Éditions du CNRS and Cerf, sept. 2011, (First edition 1992).
- Renée Poznanski, Propagandes et persécutions, La Résistance et le 'problème juif', Paris, Fayard, 2008.
- Renée Poznanski, Les Juifs en France, pendant la Seconde Guerre mondiale, New pocket edition (in French), January 2005, Pluriel, Hachette-Littératures, Paris (First edition in 1994; English edition in 2001; Hebrew edition in 1999).
