= List of castles in Picardy =

This list of castles in Picardy is a list of medieval castles or château forts in the region in northern France.

Links in italics are links to articles in the French Wikipedia.

== Aisne ==
Name	Date	Condition	Image	Ownership / Access	Notes
Château de Château-Thierry	9–17th century	Ruins			
Château de Coucy	c.1220	Ruins			Keep was 180 ft (55 m) high, in 1917 the German army dynamited the keep and the four corner towers using 28 tons of explosives.
Château de Fère-en-Tardenois	13th century	Ruins			
Château de La Ferté-Milon		Ruins			
Château de Guise	10–16th century	Ruins		Ville de Guise	
Donjon de Septmonts	14th century	Substantially intact		Commune	

== Oise ==
Name	Date	Condition	Image	Ownership / Access	Notes
Donjon de Clermont	11–13th century	Ruins			
Château de Montataire	12–15th century				
Château de Pierrefonds	c.1393–1407	Reconstructed			Imaginatively reconstructed by Viollet-le-Duc 1857–85, on the instruction of Napoleon III of France.
Château de Verneuil-en-Halatte		Ruins			Royal castle of Henri IV of France.
Château de Vez	13–14th century	Substantially intact			

== Somme ==
Name	Date	Condition	Image	Ownership / Access	Notes
Château de Boves	10th century	Fragmentary remains			
Château d'Eaucourt-sur-Somme	15th century	Fragmentary remains			
Château de Folleville	14th century	Fragmentary remains			
Château de Ham	11–15th century	Fragment			Dynamited on 19 March 1917 by the German Army.
Château de Péronne		Three towers and walls			Contains First World War museum, the Historial de la Grande Guerre
Château de Picquigny	11–14th century	Fragmentary remains			Severely damaged in World War I.
Château de Rambures	15th century	Intact			Largely built of brick.

== See also ==
- List of castles in France
- List of châteaux in France
