= Patriotic consent =

Acceptance of war for nationalist reasons

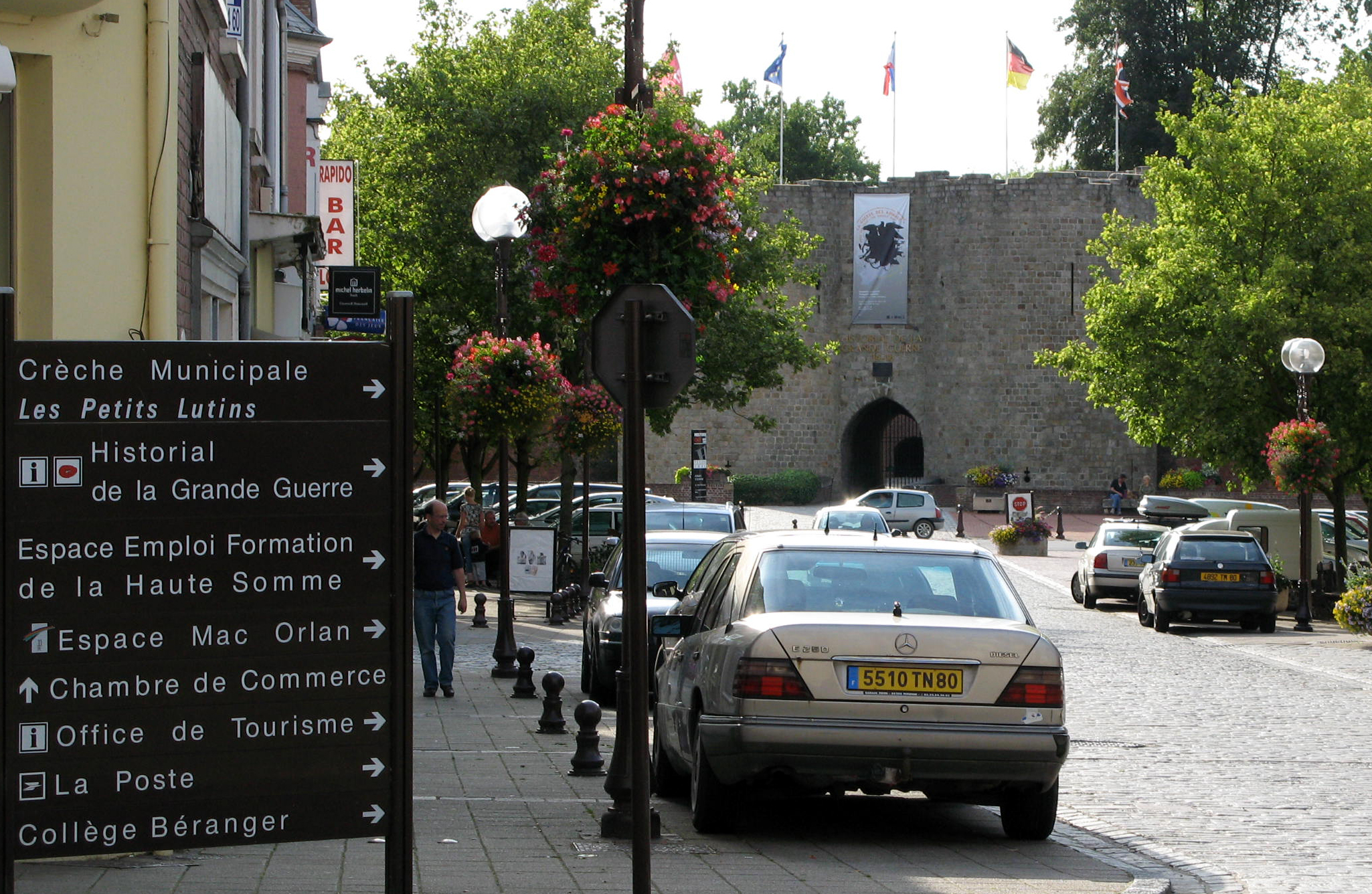
The concept was developed by historians from the Museum of the Great War in Péronne.

The concept of patriotic consent (French: Consentement patriotique) refers to the acceptance of an armed conflict for nationalist reasons, by the combatants themselves. It was notably used in connection with the First World War.

This notion was developed in the 1990s by a group of historians attached to the Historical Research Centre of the Museum of the Great War in Péronne, including the French historians Jean-Jacques Becker, Annette Becker and Stéphane Audoin-Rouzeau. It is formulated in particular by the latter two in the work 14–18, Retrouver la guerre (Paris, Gallimard, 2000).

== Concept ==
The concept of patriotic consent concerns the great war of 1914–1918. It argues that attachment to the nation, the will to win the war and to protect the homeland against the enemy prevailed within European societies and also among fighting troops over the suffering endured by combat and deprivation.

This idea may explain why the outbreak of the First World War was greeted without panic in 1914 in most of the belligerent states, and even provoked enthusiastic reactions in certain places or circles (especially large cities). It was reflected at the political level by the establishment in the various countries concerned of governments of Sacred Union, where political differences were put aside, the entire political class forming a united front.

Few historians have disseminated the term "patriotic consent" and made it the determining explanatory factor of the tenacity of the populations during the war, in particular of the combatants. Indeed, at first glance, the war continued without encountering large-scale organized opposition. A counter-example, however, is that of Russia with the Bolshevik Revolution. This is certainly linked to the particular context which has always been an empire much more than a nation, and where the modern economy and state are much more fragile than elsewhere. But the Revolution cannot be detached from the context of the Great War that triggered it.

From this perspective, consent is said to be "patriotic" because it is based on a nationalism explicitly carrying hatred toward the demonized enemy, which would be confirmed by a certain number of cruel practices observed either on the front or against the invaded civilian populations (rapes, massacres of entire villages, unnecessary destruction, scorched earth).

== Debate ==
The concept of patriotic consent, sometimes disseminated in the media and education, is recognized by some French and even other European historians. But many researchers have discussed this term (conscious or unconscious consent, reasoned choice or due to brainwashing) and the vision of combatant societies that it conveys, triggering a "consent quarrel". Among them are Antoine Prost, Frédéric Rousseau and Rémy Cazals. A group of historians particularly interested in qualifying the thesis of "patriotic consent" was founded in 2005 under the name of CRID 14–18.

The critical historiographical discussion, often virulent, focuses on several points:

- the fact that the sources which support the thesis of "consent" come mainly from the elites, intellectuals and those behind the lines, without taking into account the very numerous testimonies of combatants who may show indifference towards patriotism;
- the reductive aspect of a thesis which makes the beliefs and representations of individuals (their patriotism or even their self-constraint ) the ultimate driving force of their conduct without paying attention to the social interactions (discipline, camaraderie, etc.) through which obedience is constructed;
- the all-encompassing nature of the thesis which assigns the same “consent” to all Europeans without taking into account national differences:
  - Patriotism is thus negligible or absent for the Slavic populations of Austria-Hungary, who reason by their traditional loyalty to the Emperor, or for the population of Italy, the vast majority of whom were hostile to entry into the war in 1915;
  - nor the social origins and position (at the front, at the rear) of the different actors;
- the minimization of different forms of resistance (mutiny, avoidance strategies (seeking a posting to the rear for example) or accommodations (fraternizations and tacit agreements) which frequently lead combatants to try to reduce the violence of the conflict;
- the lack of analysis of the excesses of military justice, the most significant example of which are soldiers shot as an example.

The school of "consent" (consent understood in terms of realistic and sometimes desperate acceptance) is sometimes contrasted with a school of "constraint", represented by many historians and in particular by members of the international research and debate collective on the 1914–1918 war.

However, some studies have shown that the genesis of the outbreak of the First World War includes objective elements: the noble caste of Germany and Austria, with the brutal support of the Pan-Germanist circles of these two countries, clearly acted during the months preceding the outbreak of the war. This is the thesis of Fritz Fischer.

Consent is perhaps nuanced. The archives (notably war diaries, trench newspapers and songs of the time) show sometimes complex feelings, and unease or profound misunderstandings between "the rear" and the poilus combatants at the front. The numerous and sometimes virulent allusions of the time to the "hidden behind" (presented as cowardly civilians, moralizers, and sometimes judged "extremists" in their desire for war; which shocked Maurice Genevoix). The poilus criticize the "shirkers" of the rear, often presented as coquettish, hedonists and revelers while thousands of people die in the trenches. They also criticize the shirkers of the general staff (senior officers and their quartermasters, secretaries, mailmen, etc. deemed protected behind the front). A divide also appeared between peasants remaining at the front and small traders (except wine growers who benefited from the army's great need for wine) while workers were sent back to the rear for the needs of the arms and munitions factories. The word "Embusqué" took on a negative connotation from the end of the 19th century.

Songs like La Chanson de Craonne combine patriotic impulses or at least a recognition of the necessity of war, but hope that the war effort be shared by all. This song evolved during the war from La Chanson de Lorette: these are signs of consent. Many mutineers demonstrated a willingness to fight, but not in the pointless and hopeless battles to which certain generals, according to them, were sending them. Soldiers at the front demanded equality in the face of time tax (3 years of military service in 1913), but also in the face of blood tax. Fraudulent networks and fake medical certificates existed, but the number of people who benefited from them ultimately seems low according to historians.

Although the extreme versions of consent (blind acceptance, joyful defence of territory, departure "with flowers in their rifles") or of constraint (officers drawing their weapons to force their men out of the trenches, strict discipline but only expressing itself in all its rigor at the beginning of the war) are indeed attested, they cannot claim to reflect the whole experience of war, the behaviour of the soldiers being above all marked by resignation which makes it difficult to distinguish the degree of consent and submission.

The history of representations shows that reasons other than patriotic consent or strict constraint can explain why soldiers stayed at the front: group pressure and attachment to comrades; a feeling of honour towards one's peers, one's family, one's village, loyalty being the least socially costly for post-war reintegration; the desire of the elderly to do their duty to spare the younger generations from having to participate in the war.

== See also ==
- Historiography of World War I
- Museum of the Great War

== Bibliography ==
- Birnbaum, Jean (2006). "Guerre de tranchées entre historiens". Le Monde..
- Interviews with Marcela Iacub by Paul Costey and Lucie Tangy and with Christian Ingrao by Juliette Denis, Revue de sciences humaines Tracés , n ^{o} 14,January 2008.
- François Cochet (2005). Survivre au front 1914–1918 : les poilus entre contrainte et consentement. 14–18 éditions. p. 263.
