= Jean-Baptiste Tournassoud =

French photographer and military officer (1866–1951)

Jean-Baptiste Tournassoud (May 3, 1866 – January 5, 1951) was a French photographer and military officer.

== Biography ==
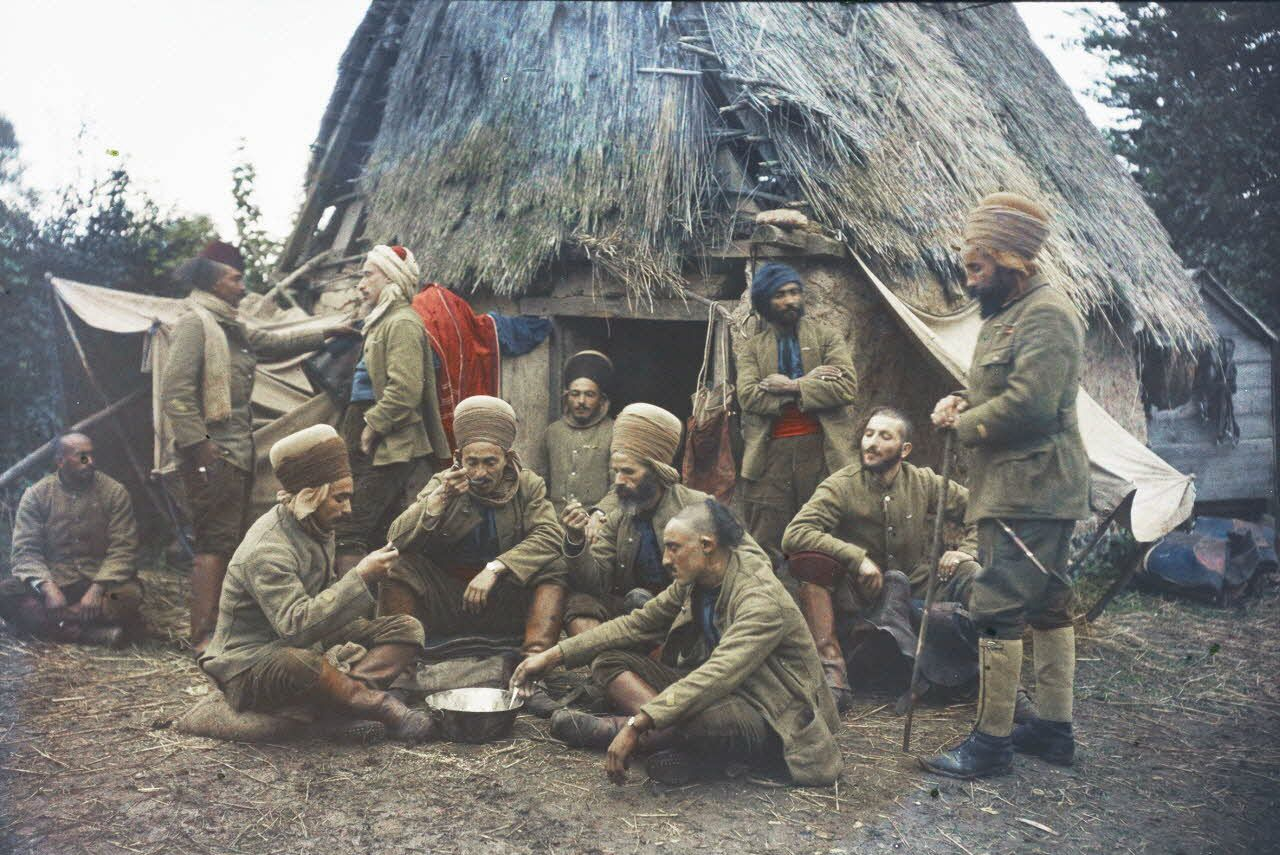
North African soldiers, 1915. Autochrome by Tournassoud.

Tournassoud was born May 3, 1866, in Montmerle-sur-Saône. In 1879, he was first in the canton for the certificate of primary studies and followed a course in carpentry. At the end of his basic military service in 1887, Tounassoud remained with the Army and began a military career. He married Georgette Michel in 1901 and the following year became the father of a daughter named Juliette.

He was a pioneer of color photography, using autochrome plates. As subject matter he particularly favoured the French Army of the years 1908-1914, both because of his own military background and because of the colourful uniforms of this period, worn even when on active service in Morocco.

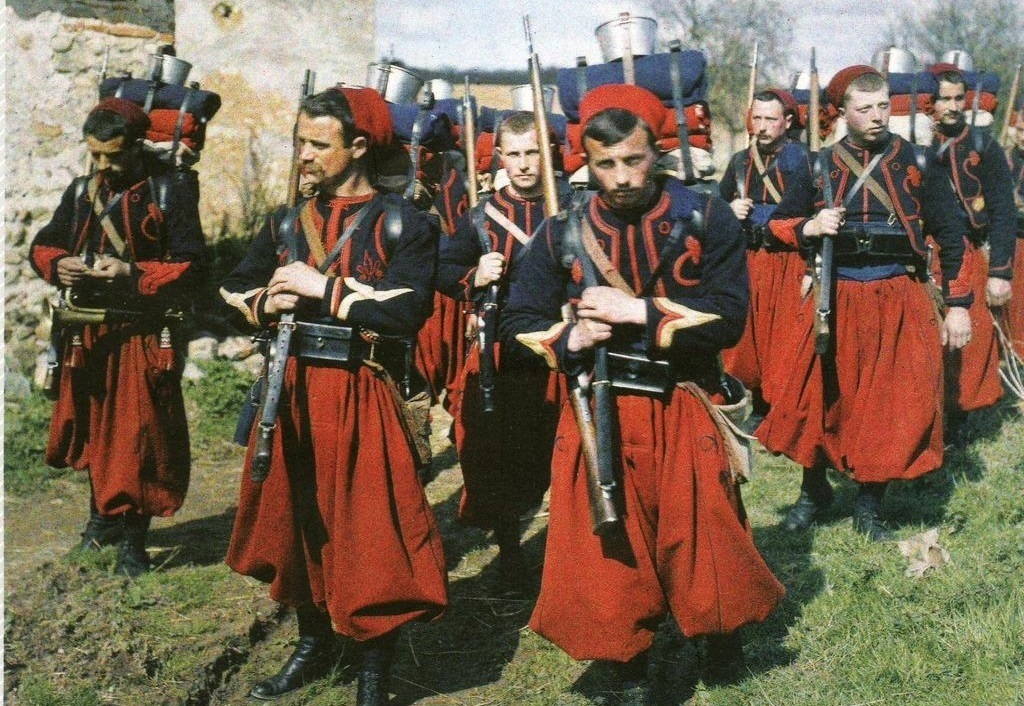
Tournassoud autochrome colour photograph of French 3rd Zouaves 1912

Tournassoud was director of the Photographic and Cinematographic Service of the War (French: Service photographique et cinématographique de la guerre - SPCG) from October 30, 1918, to September 30, 1919.

He retired from the Army in 1920. He settled in Montmerle and remained a photographer until his death, in 1951, at the age of 84.

Tournassoud left about 2,500 photographs, both black-and-white and color.

== Collections ==
Collections of his works are owned by:

- Institut Lumière, Lyon
- Musée des Pays de l'Ain, Bourg-en-Bresse
- Musée Nicéphore-Niépce, Châlon-sur-Saône
- Musée Clemenceau, Paris
- Museum of the Great War, Château de Péronne, Somme, France
