= Jean-Jacques Becker =

French historian (1928–2023)

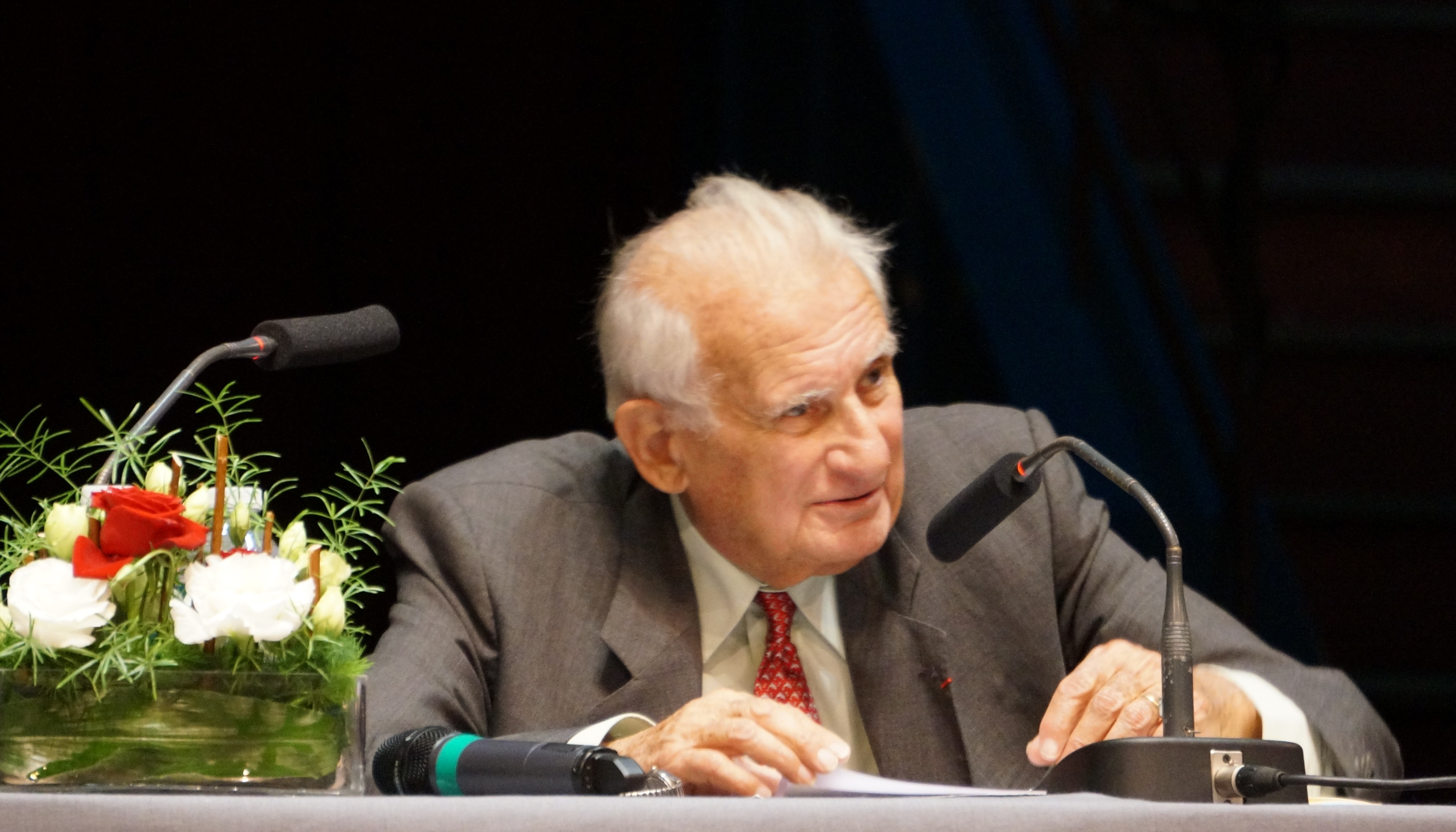
- Becker in 2013
- Born: 14 May 1928; Paris, France
- Died: 10 July 2023 (aged 95); France
- Education: Lycée Champollion; Paris Nanterre University (Doctorat)
- Occupation: Historian
- Known for: historian on WW1 patriotic consent
- Children: Annette Becker
- Family: Annie Kriegel (sister)

Jean-Jacques Becker (14 May 1928 – 10 July 2023) was a French historian. A specialist of contemporary history, he was the brother of historian Annie Kriegel and father to World War I specialist Annette Becker.

== Biography ==
Jean-Jacques Becker was born into a family descended from the Jewish community of Alsace-Lorraine, located in Paris. In July 1942, he entered the South zone with his parents who settled in Grenoble (Isère). He continued his studies at the Lycée Champollion earning his Baccalauréat. Following the popularity of his family to communism, he became a member of the Communist Party from 1947 to 1960. Because of his membership in the Communist Party, he did not participate in the war in Algeria. Having left the Communist Party, he continued to engage in trade unions as a member of the National Union of Secondary Education (SNES), of which he was secretary of the section of the school of Auxerre, then that of Arago school. He was actively involved in the strikes of May–June 1968.

After teaching in secondary education (Peronne, Auxerre, Arago - Paris-) until 1968, he was a lecturer at the University of Paris-X Nanterre until 1977, a university professor in Clermont-Ferrand 1977 to 1985 (and Dean of the Faculty of Arts from 1982 to 1985) and Paris-X Nanterre from 1985 to 1994 (and vice-president of the University from 1986 to 1989). He chaired the jury of the aggregation of History in 1990, 1991 and 1992. He argued in 1976 his doctoral thesis on "French public opinion and the beginning of the War of 1914" prepared under the direction of Pierre Renouvin. He dedicated his work to two major historical areas, World War I and the political history of France in the 20th century, particularly the labor movement and communism. He was also Honorary President of the International Research Center of the Museum of the Great War in Peronne, and winner of JF Mege Academy of Science, Literature and Arts Clermont-Ferrand. He succeeded Léo Hamon as vice-president of the Society for the Study jaurésiennes.

Becker died on 10 July 2023, at the age of 95.

== Publications ==
=== On War ===
- Dictionary of the Great War, Brussels, André Versaille editor, 2008
- Year 14, Paris, Armand Colin, 2005
- Encyclopedia of the Great War, co-directed with Stéphane Audoin-Rouzeau, Paris, Bayard, 2004
- The First World War, Belin, Paris, [1996] 2003, (ISBN 2-7011-3699-7)
- The Great War, Paris, PUF, 2004
- The Treaty of Versailles, Paris, PUF, 2002
- Clemenceau Thirty Questions, Paris, Editions Gesture, 2001
- Clemenceau, the Intractable, Paris, Liana Levi, 1998
- The Great War in Europe, Paris, Belin sup. Histoire. 1996, reissued as The War moindiale, 2003
- France, the Nation, the War (1850-1920), Paris Sedes, 1995 (in collaboration with Stéphane Audoin-Rouzeau)
- Cultures and Wars, 1914-1918, Paris, Armand Colin, 1994 (with Jay M. Winter, Gerd Krumeich, Annette Becker and Stéphane Audoin-Rouzeau)
- European Societies and the War of 1914-1918, Paris X-Nanterre, 1990 (co-directed with Stéphane Audoin-Rouzeau)
- France in War. The Transformation, Brussels, Complexe, 1988
- The French in the Great War, Paris, Robert Laffont, 1980
- 1914, How the French Entered the War, Press the National Foundation for Political Science, Paris, 1977
- The B Book, Governments and Anti-militarism Before the War of 1914, Paris, Klincksieck, 1973
- 1914, the War and the French Labor Movement, with Annie Kriegel, Armand Colin, Paris, 1964

=== On other topics ===
- History of the Left in France, co-edited with Gilles Candar, La Découverte, Paris, 2004
- France from 1914 to 1940, Paris, PUF, 2005
- Political History of France Since 1945, 10th edition, Armand Colin, Paris, 2003
- New History of Contemporary France, Volume 19, Alternations and Crises, 1974-1995 (in collaboration with Pascal Ory). Paris, Seuil, Points 1998, edition 1974-2000, 2002
- New History of Contemporary France, Volume 12, Wins and Frustrations, 1914-1929, with Serge Berstein, Paris, Seuil, Points, 1990
- History of Anticommunism in France with Serge Berstein, Volume 1 (1917-1940) Orban, Paris, 1987
- The Communist Party does he Take Power? (The Strategy of the Communist Party from 1930 to Today). Editions du Seuil, Paris, 1981
