= Jeanne Macherez =

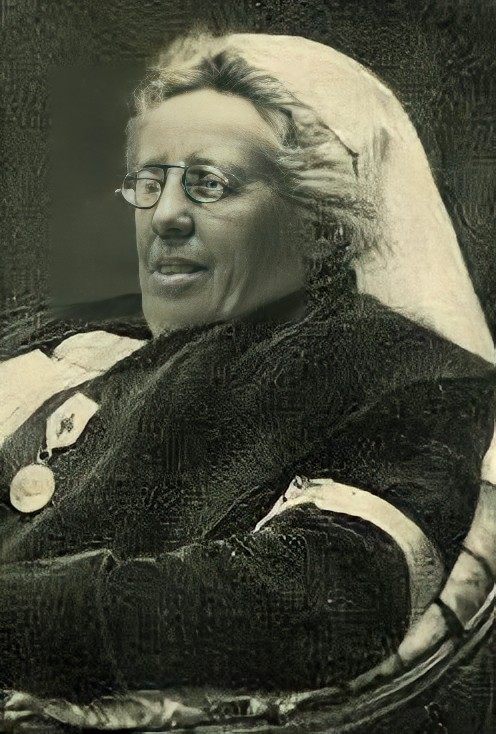
Jeanne Macherez, 1914

Jeanne Macherez (12 April 1852 – 9 December 1930) was a French heroine during the World War I. In 1914, she proclaimed herself Mayor of Soissons.

== Biography ==
Jehanne Louise Virginie Wateau was born in Guise on 12 April 1852. She was the daughter of farmers, Virgile Wateau and Valentine Dorigny. She married in Metz, Alfred Macherez who later became general counsel, deputy and senator of Aisne. The couple moved to Soissons. Alfred died on 1 July 1904.

Macherez was particularly committed to humanitarian causes. She created the organization, Goutte de lait, which helped infants. She served as president for the Soissons-Braine region of the Association of French Women and was a member of the French Red Cross.

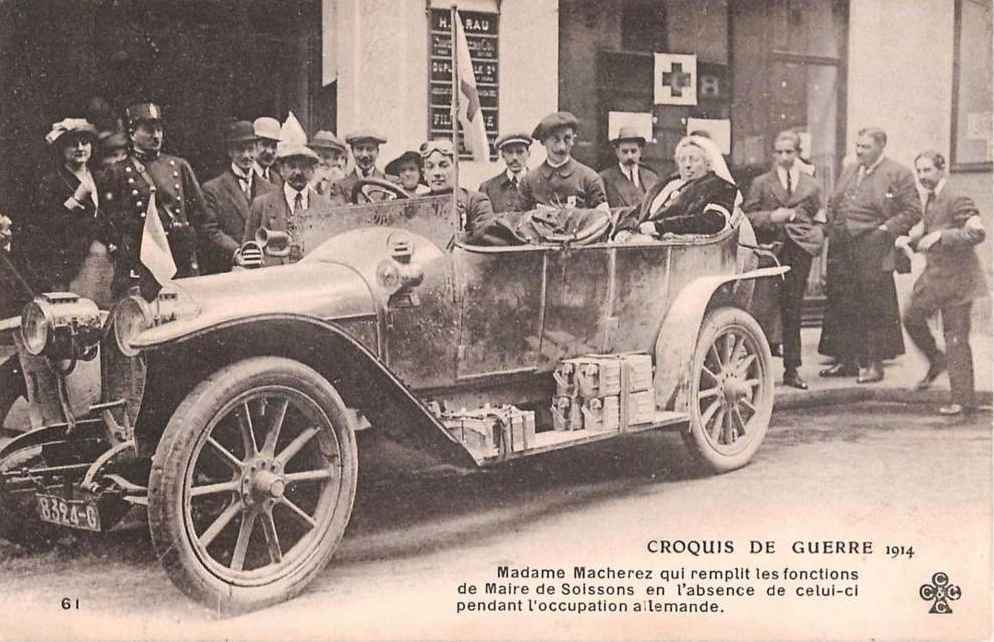
Jeanne Macherez, as Mayor of Soissons during the German occupation in September 1914.

When the WWI broke out, Macherez ran the Hospital Auxiliary #201, which had 10 ambulances. The Germans arrived in Soissons on 1 September 1914. An officer, looking for supplies, enters the city and demanded to speak to the mayor. He threatened that if the mayor does not give himself up, the city will be sacked, burned. Macherez spoke up: "The mayor? It's me!". For twelve days, she was the interlocutor of the Germans. She negotiated everything, managed to minimize the negative fallout of this occupation, and protected the region from German abuses and looting. On 12 September 1914, at the end of the First Battle of the Marne, the Germans were forced to release their hold on Soissons, and occupy only the right bank of the Aisne. Macherez resumed her duties in the hospital alongside a Parisian, Germaine Malaterre-Sellier. The prefect of the Aisne, Robert Leullier then appointed Georges Muzart to be the mayor of Soissons. The role held by Macherez was praised by some, and minimized by others. She claimed nothing, only observing that it is the circumstances that led her to take this role.

Macherez died in Soissons on 9 December 1930.

== Awards and honors ==
- June 3, 1916, Audifred Prize of the Academy of Moral and Political Sciences
- October 1920, Knight of the Legion of Honour
- December 20, 1955, a street is named after her in the Saint-Crépin district of Soissons
