= Annette Becker =

French historian (born 1953)

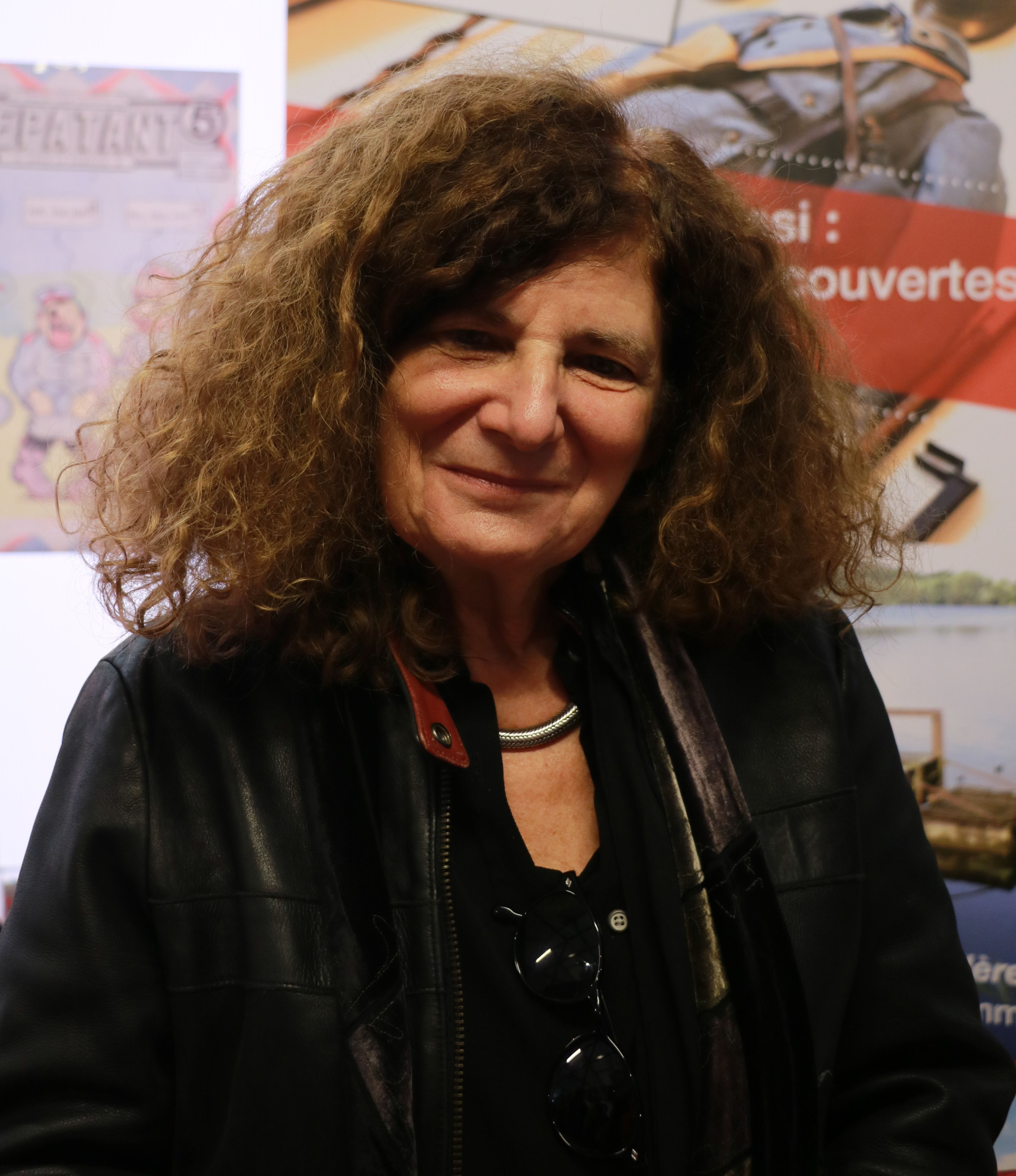
- Born: 21 August 1953 (age 73); Bourgoin-Jallieu, France
- Relatives: Jean-Jacques Becker (father)

Academic work
- Discipline: History
- Sub-discipline: First World War, Patriotic consent

Annette Becker (born 21 August 1953) is a French historian specializing in study of World War I. She is daughter of historian Jean-Jacques Becker.

== Works ==
- 14-18
- Collab. with Stéphane Audoin-Rouzeau, La Grande Guerre : 1914-1918, Paris, Gallimard, coll. "Découvertes Gallimard" (nº 357), 1998.
