= Guise =

- Commune
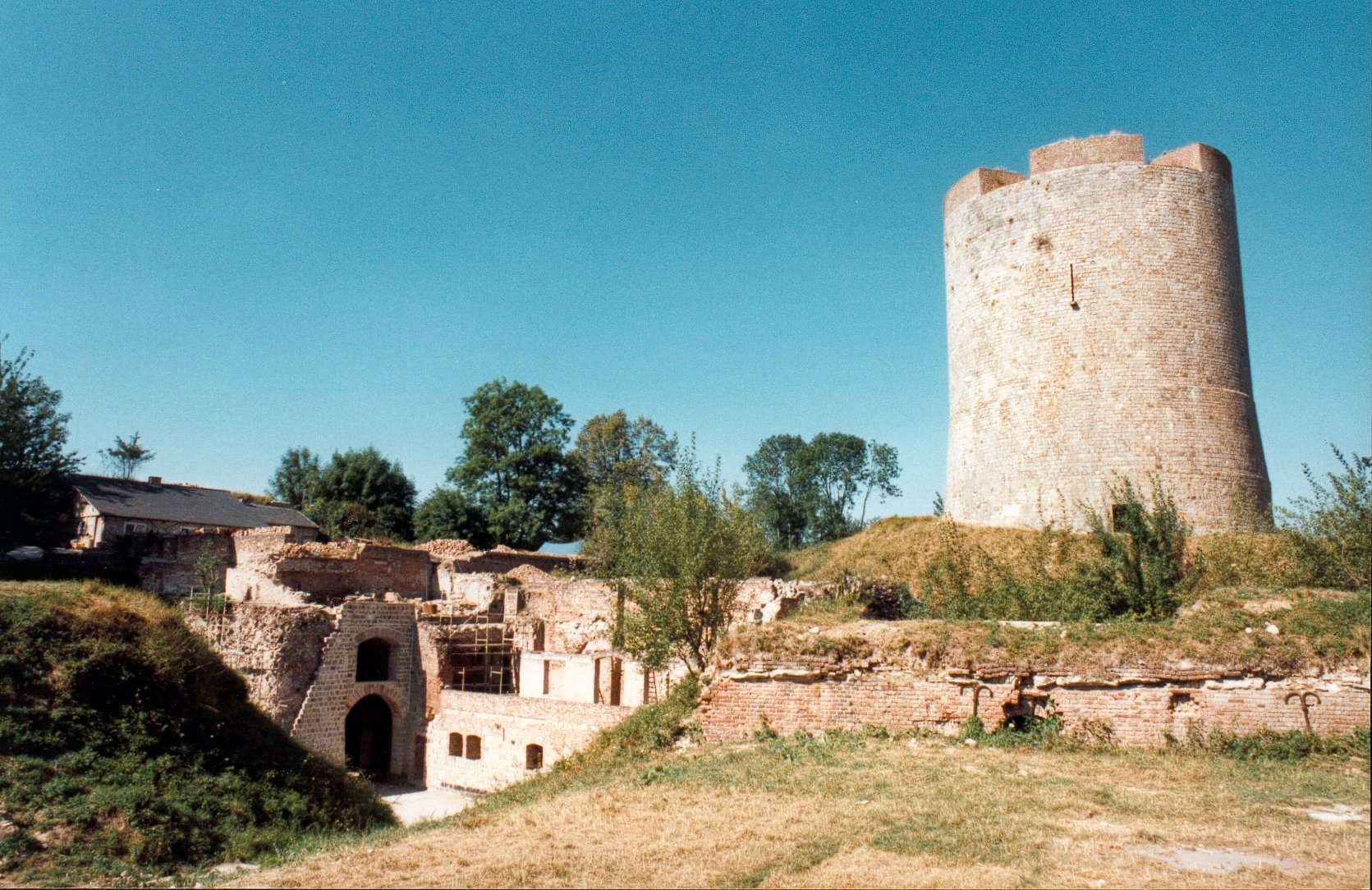
- Dungeon and basse court of the Château de Guise

- Coat of arms
- Location of Guise
- Location within France Location within Hauts-de-France
- Coordinates: 49°54′03″N 3°37′42″E
- Country: France
- Region: Hauts-de-France
- Department: Aisne
- Arrondissement: Vervins
- Canton: Guise

Government
  - Mayor (2026–32): Hugues Cochet
- Area^{1}: 16.13 km^{2} (6.23 sq mi)
- Elevation: 97 m (318 ft)
- Highest elevation: 157 m (515 ft)
- Lowest elevation: 91 m (299 ft)
- Population (2023): 4,490
  - Density: 278/km^{2} (721/sq mi)
- Time zone: UTC+01:00 (CET)
  - Summer (DST): UTC+02:00 (CEST)
- INSEE/Postal code: 02361 /02120
- ^{1} French Land Register data, which excludes lakes, ponds, glaciers > 1 km^{2} (0.386 sq mi or 247 acres) and river estuaries.

Guise (/ɡwiːz/ GWEEZ, French: [ɡɥiz]; Dutch: Wieze) is a commune in the Aisne department in Hauts-de-France in northern France. The city was the birthplace of the noble family of Guise, Dukes of Guise, who later became Princes of Joinville.

== Population ==
Historical population

Year	Pop.	±% p.a.
1793	3,085	—
1800	3,039	−0.21%
1806	3,097	+0.32%
1821	2,729	−0.84%
1831	3,072	+1.19%
1836	3,241	+1.08%
1841	3,543	+1.80%
1846	3,528	−0.08%
1851	4,060	+2.85%
1856	3,684	−1.92%
1861	4,529	+4.22%
1866	5,289	+3.15%
1872	5,659	+1.13%
1876	6,250	+2.51%
1881	7,131	+2.67%
1886	7,677	+1.49%
1891	8,153	+1.21%
1896	8,082	−0.17%
1901	7,310	−1.99%

Year	Pop.	±% p.a.
1906	7,776	+1.24%
1911	8,099	+0.82%
1921	6,185	−2.66%
1926	7,097	+2.79%
1931	7,110	+0.04%
1936	6,981	−0.37%
1946	6,031	−1.45%
1954	6,091	+0.12%
1962	6,284	+0.39%
1968	6,805	+1.34%
1975	6,642	−0.35%
1982	6,195	−0.99%
1990	5,976	−0.45%
1999	5,901	−0.14%
2007	5,489	−0.90%
2012	5,182	−1.14%
2017	4,824	−1.42%
2023	4,490	−1.19%

Source: EHESS and INSEE (1968–2023)

== Sights ==
The remains of the medieval castle of Guise, the seat of the Dukes of Guise, is within the commune.

== Economy ==
Guise is the agricultural centre of the northern area of Aisne.

== Miscellaneous ==
Guise was the birthplace of Camille Desmoulins (1760–1794), a journalist and politician who played an important part in the French Revolution, and that of Jeanne Macherez who was a heroine during the World War I.

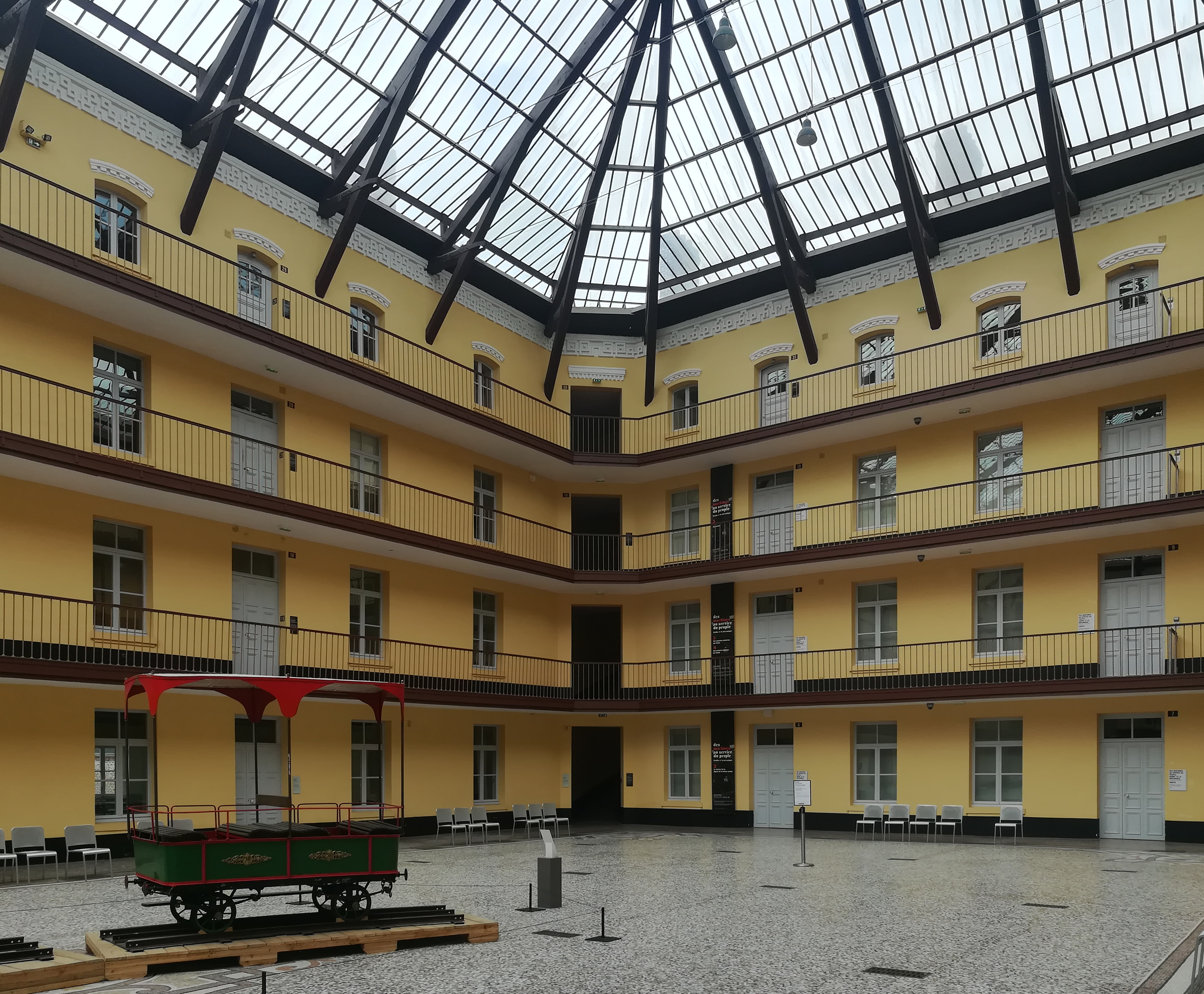
Le Familistère de Guise

Over a period of 20 years, beginning about 1856, Jean-Baptiste Godin built the Familistery of Guise (the Social Palace), an industrial and communal residential complex that was a separate community within Guise. It expressed many of his ideas about developing social sympathy through improved housing and services for workers and their families, influenced by the ideas of the philosopher Charles Fourier. In 1880 Godin created a cooperative association by which the workers owned and managed the complex. This continued until 1968.

On the 29th of August 1914 the Battle of St. Quentin (1914) was fought in and around the town. A memorial in Guise celebrates this event.

== See also ==
- House of Guise
- Communes of the Aisne department
