= Guise castle =

- Château-Fort de Guise
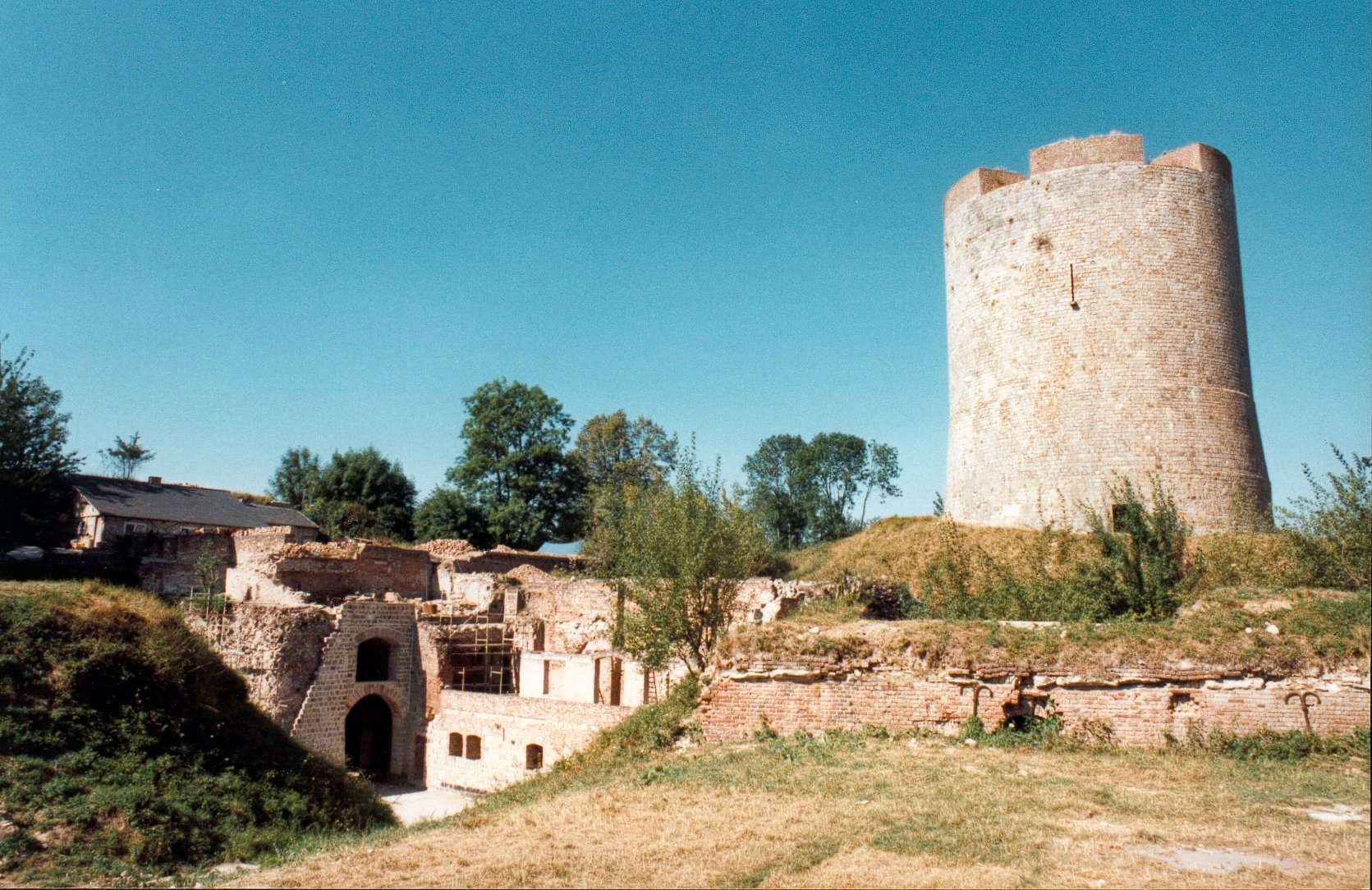
- Parts of the ramparts and donjon
- Interactive map of the Guise castle area

General information
- Location: Allée Maurice Duton, 02120 Guise, Guise, France
- Groundbreaking: 10th Century
- Owner: Club du Vieux Manoir

Website
- chateaudeguise.fr

Guise castle is a medieval fortification in the town of Guise ([ɡɥiz]), in northern France. Originally an early medieval wooden motte and bailey castle, it was rebuilt in stone and then massively expanded during the 12th-16th centuries. It was remodelled by Marquis de Vauban in the late 17th century to meet the advances in sIege technology then taking place. Much of the castle was reduced to rubble during the First World War and, from 1952 onwards, it has been undergoing restoration by the Club du Vieux Manoir. Nowadays it is a popular tourist site.

== Location ==
The town of Guise and its fortress is on high ground on the west bank of the river Oise, in the Aisne département, in France's most northern region. It is about 25 km (16 mi) west of the nearest major town, Saint-Quentin, and about 30 km (19 mi) east of the border with Belgium.

== History ==
It is at the medieval castle, first built with timbers in the 10th century and later in the 12th century rebuilt with the local stones. The castle is dominated by the keep. In the 16th century the dukes of Guise allowed the construction of one of Northern Europe's biggest bastions, which would later attract the attention of Vauban. After the shellfire during the First World War, the castle could have disappeared as a waste disposal site.
