= Péronne, Somme =

Péronne
- Subprefecture and commune
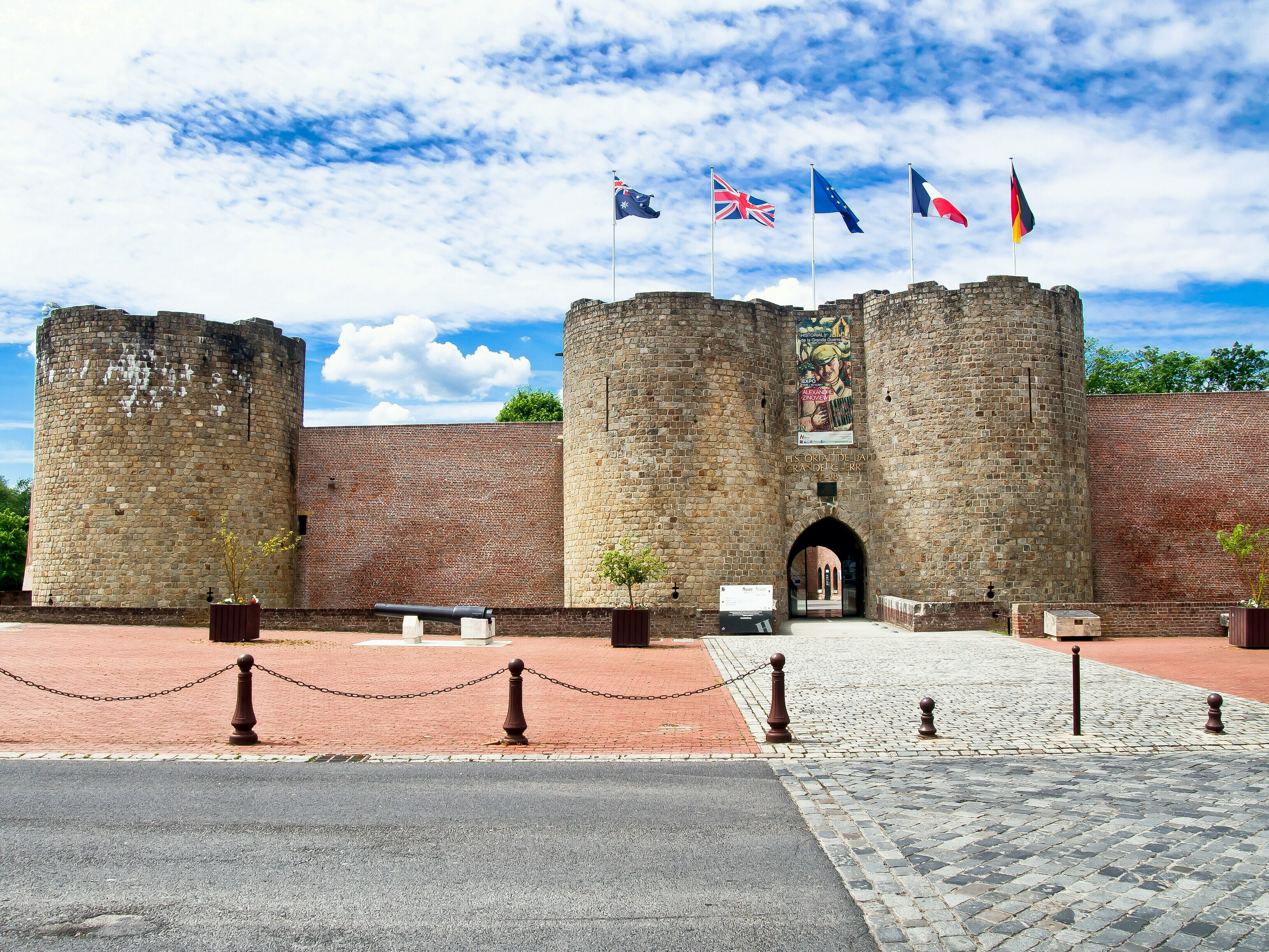
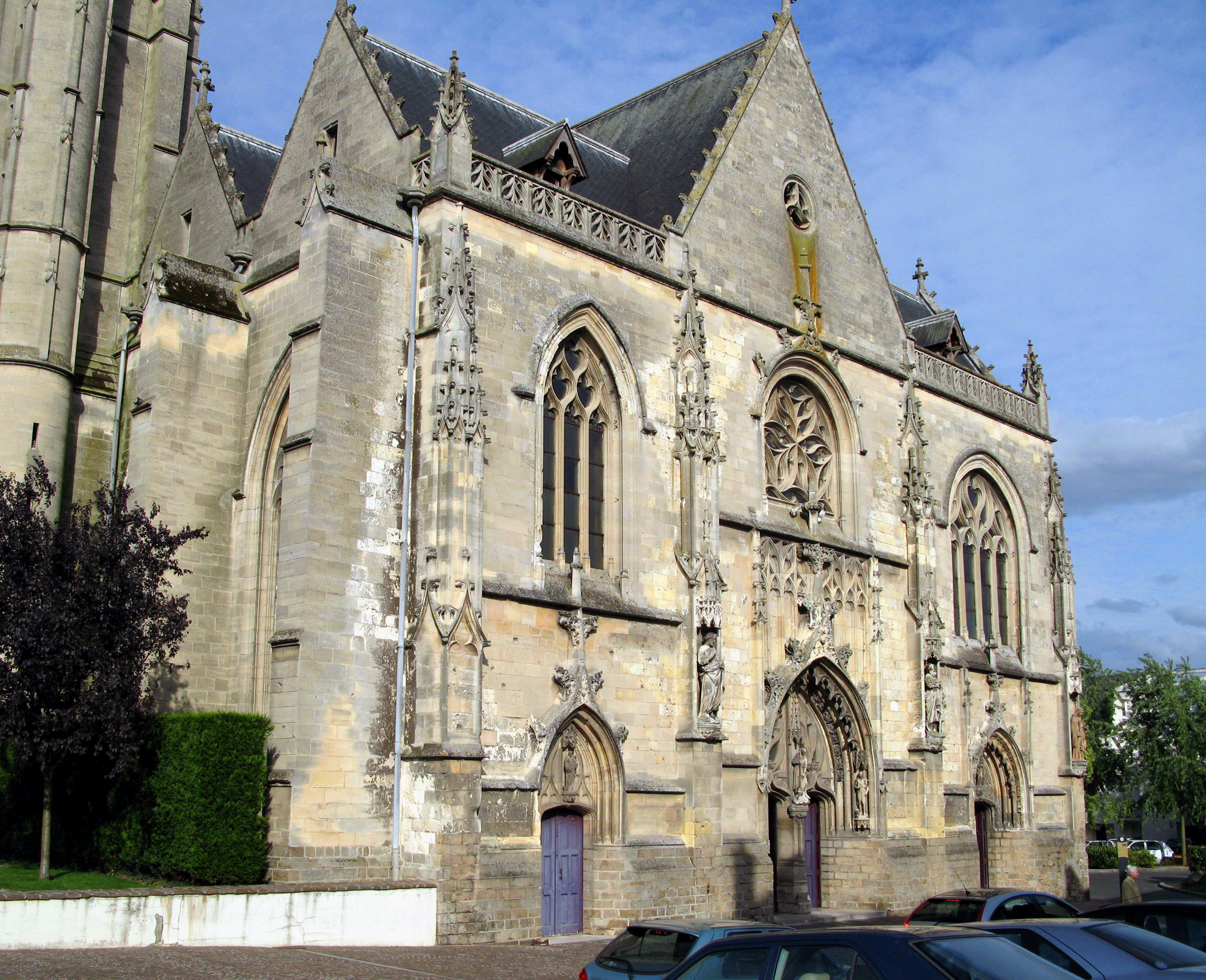
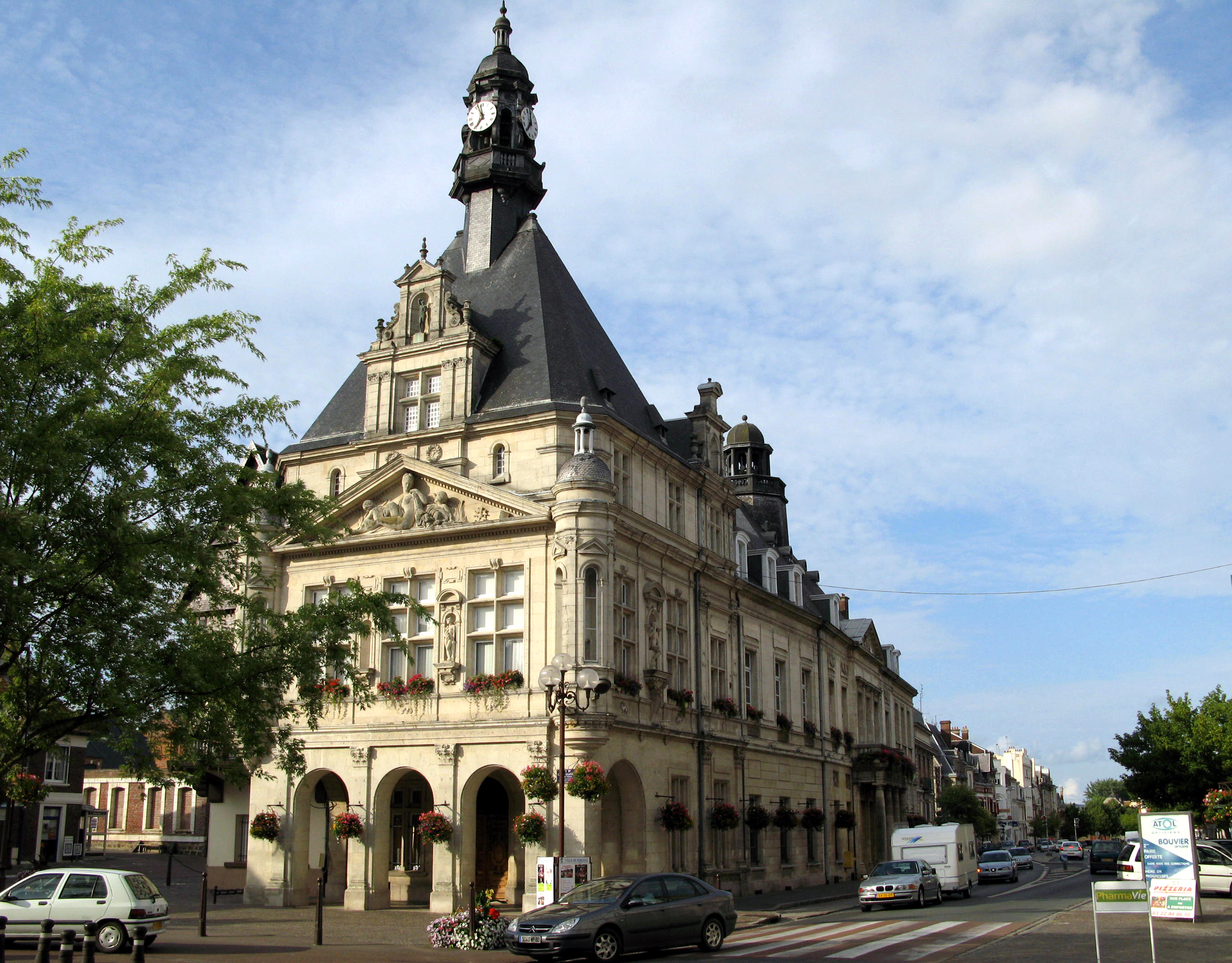
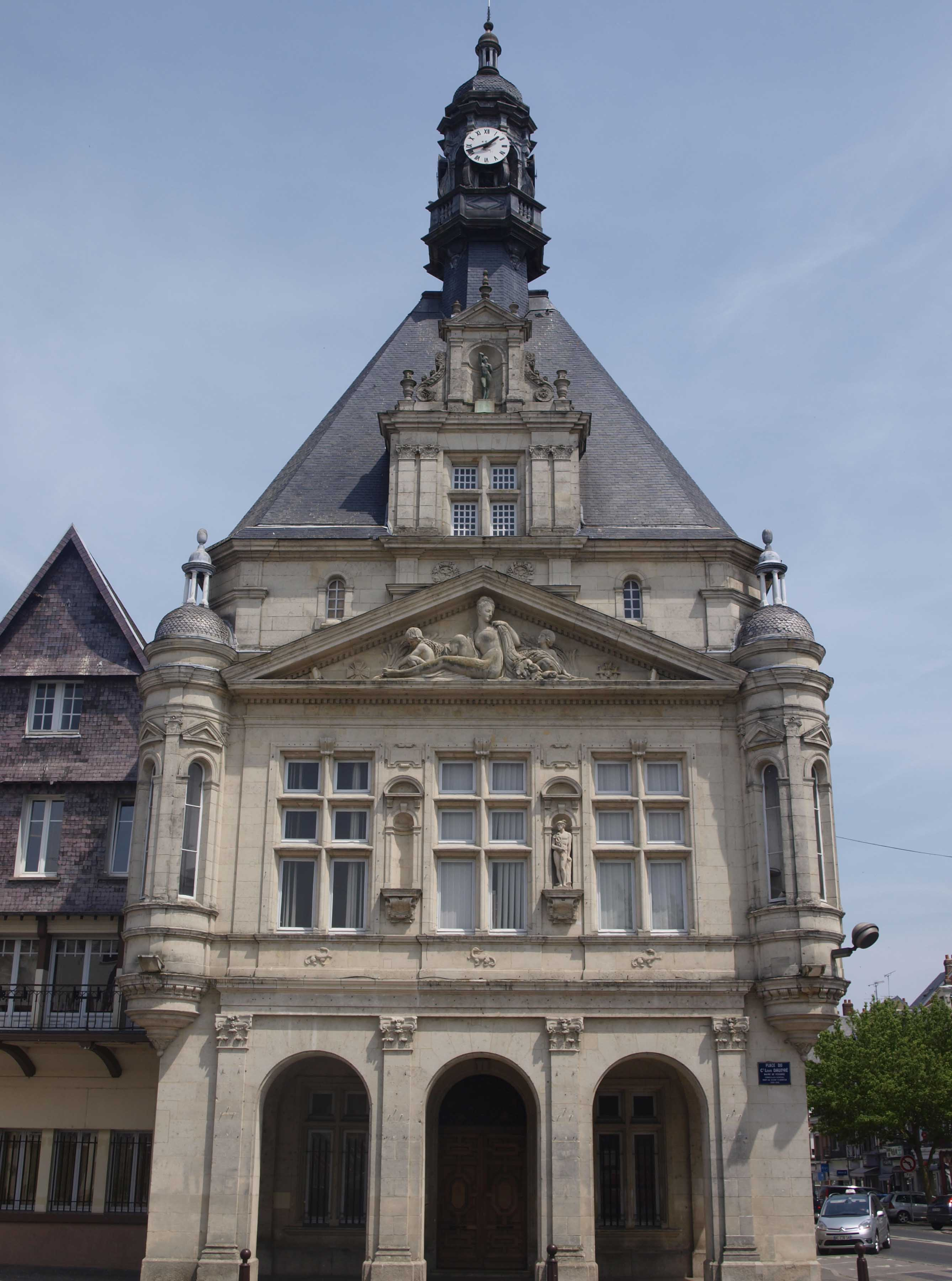
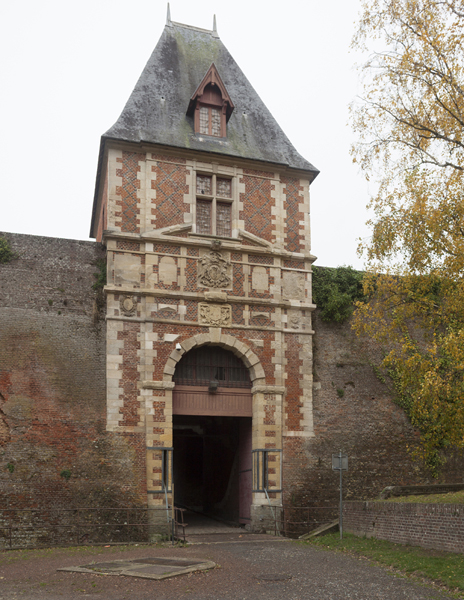
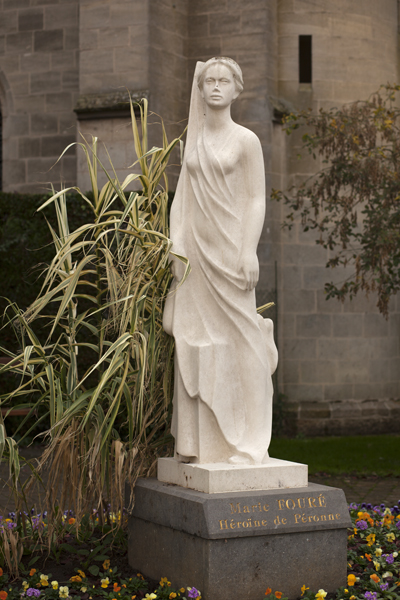
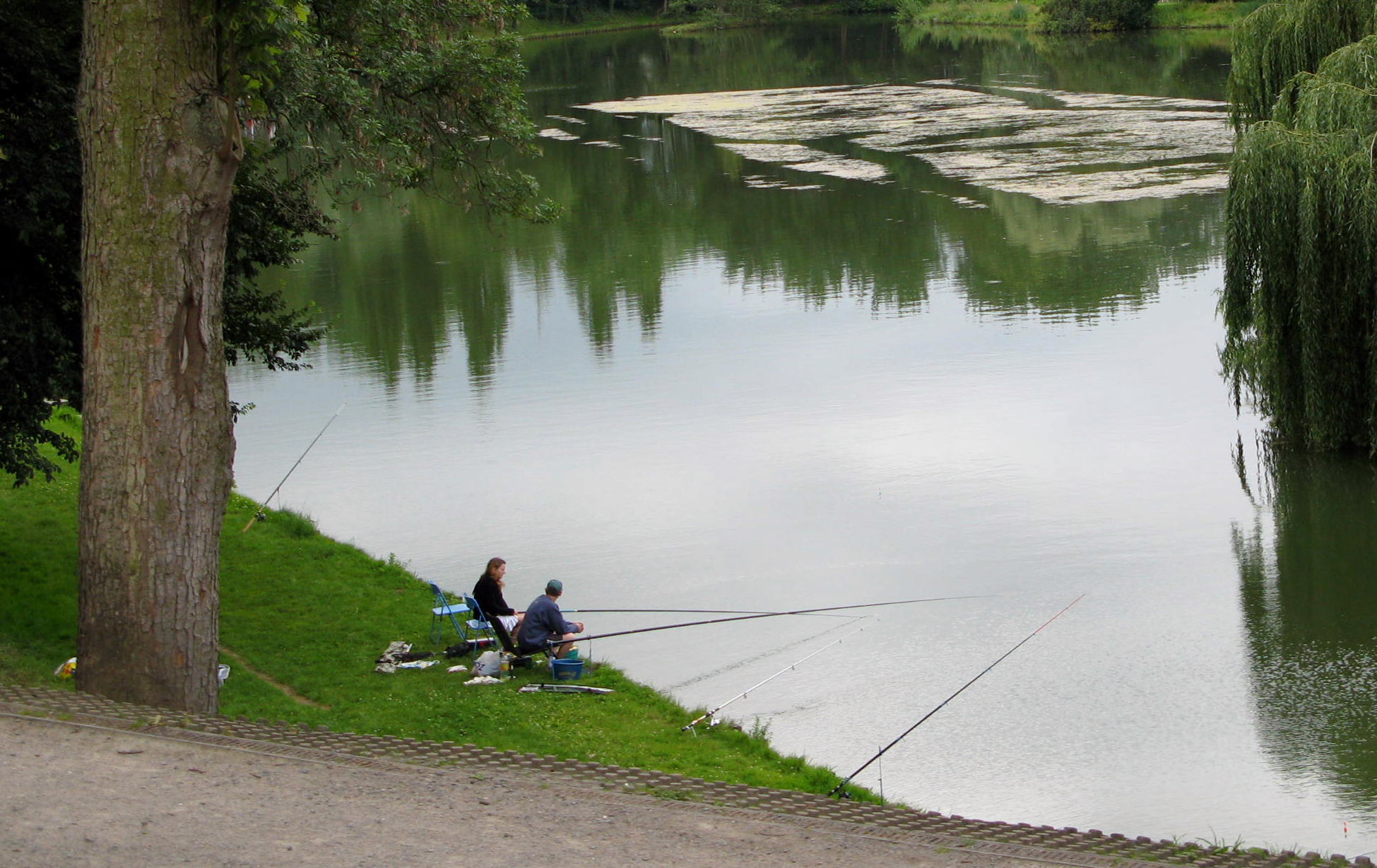
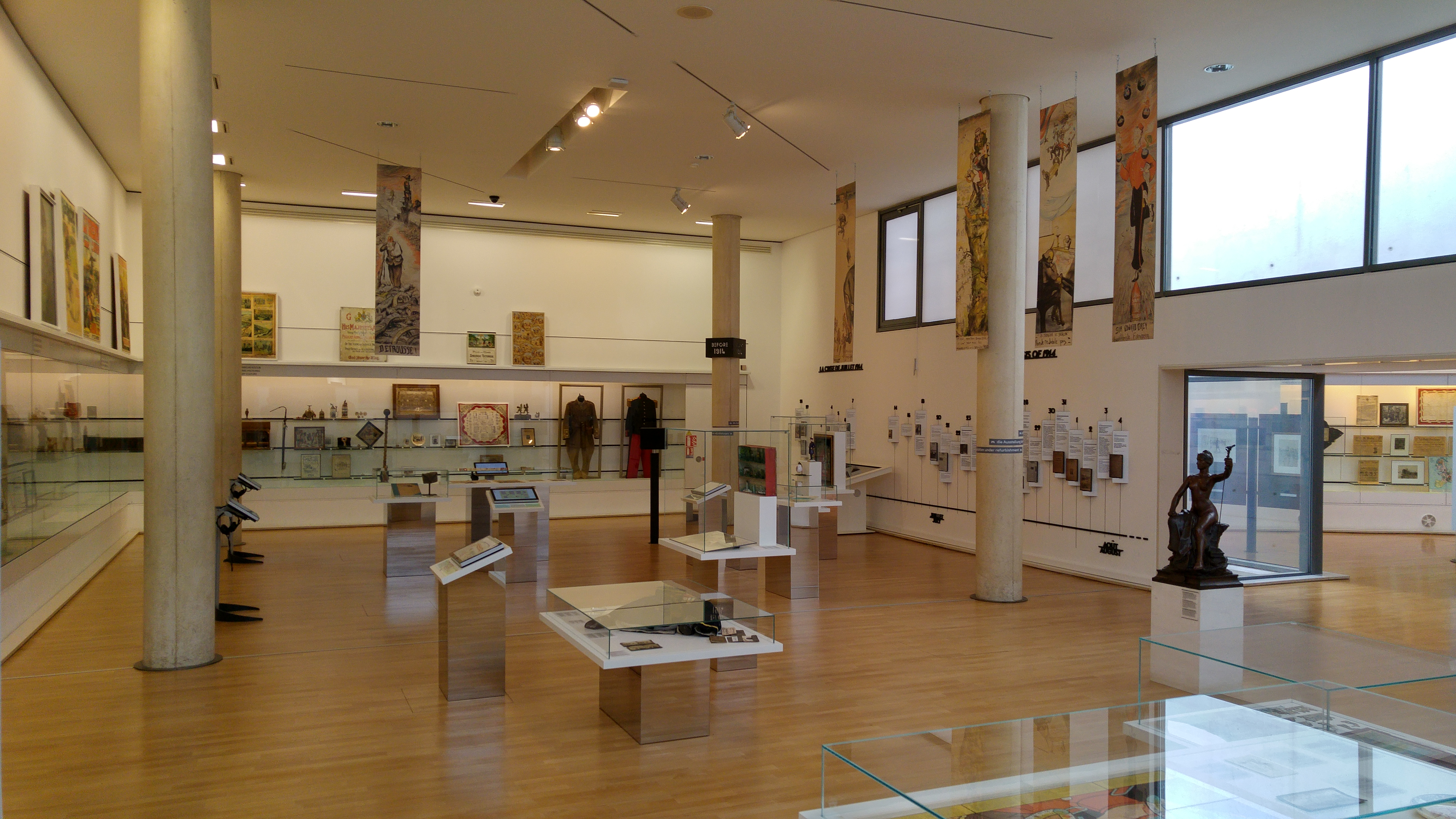
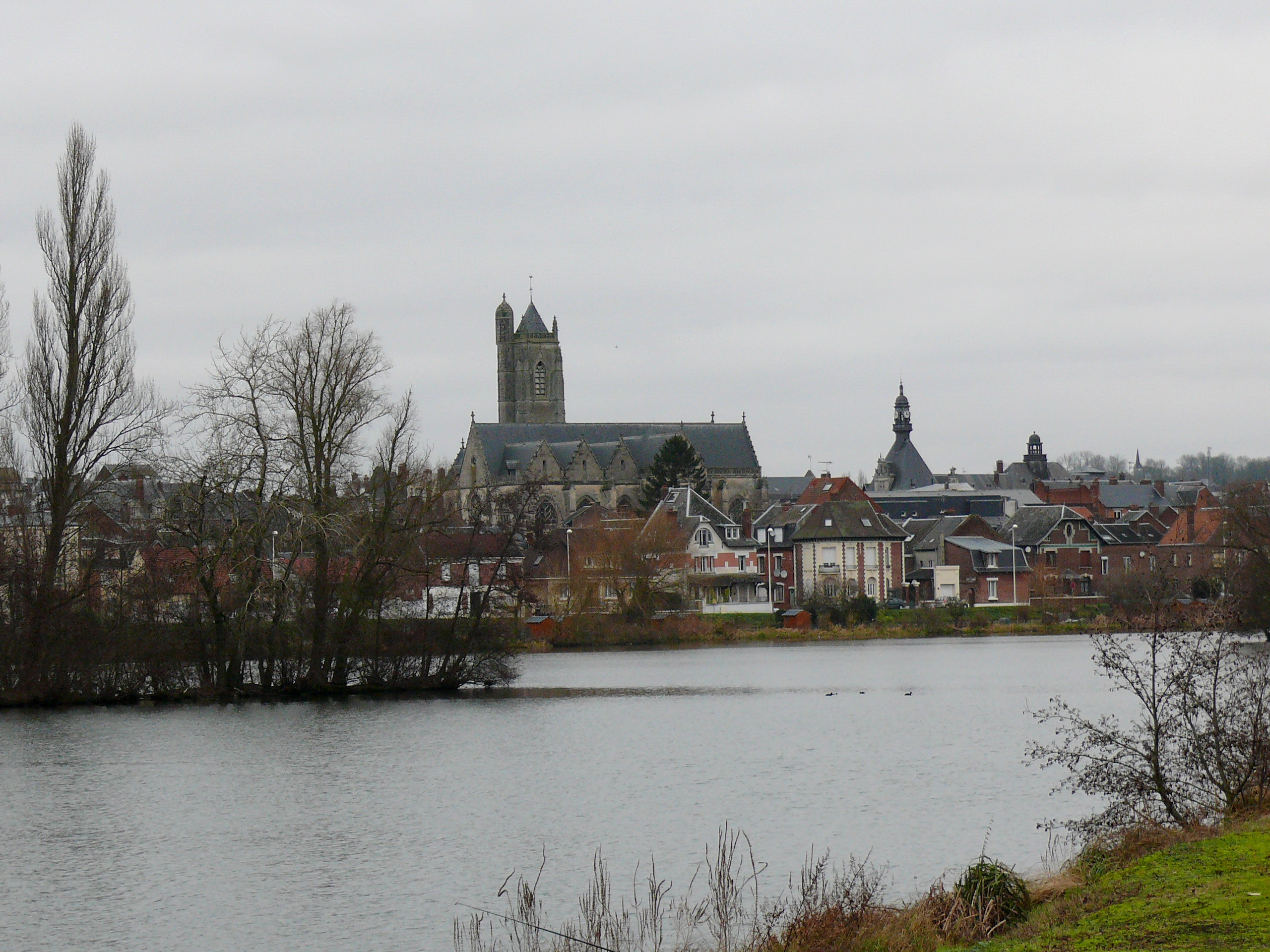

- Coat of arms
- Motto(s): Urbs nescia vinci The town that ignores defeat
- Location of Péronne
- Location within France Location within Hauts-de-France
- Coordinates: 49°55′45″N 2°55′57″E
- Country: France
- Region: Hauts-de-France
- Department: Somme
- Arrondissement: Péronne
- Canton: Péronne
- Intercommunality: Haute Somme

Government
  - Mayor (2020–2026): Gautier Maes
- Area^{1}: 14.16 km^{2} (5.47 sq mi)
- Elevation: 54 m (177 ft)
- Highest elevation: 117 m (384 ft)
- Lowest elevation: 47 m (154 ft)
- Population (2023): 7,090
  - Density: 501/km^{2} (1,300/sq mi)
- Time zone: UTC+01:00 (CET)
  - Summer (DST): UTC+02:00 (CEST)
- INSEE/Postal code: 80620 /80200
- ^{1} French Land Register data, which excludes lakes, ponds, glaciers > 1 km^{2} (0.386 sq mi or 247 acres) and river estuaries.

Péronne (French pronunciation: [peʁɔn]) is a commune of the Somme department in Hauts-de-France in northern France. It is the former site of the Péronne monastery, founded by the Anglo-Saxon St Erkenwald. Its site became the resting place for St. Fursa, celebrated by the famous English historian Bede. The monastery was popular with Irish monks, among them Cellanus, whose letters to Aldhelm the Bishop of Sherborne survive. So renowned was Péronne for Irish monks that the monastery became known as Perrona Scottorum. The monastery was destroyed in a Viking raid in 880. It is close to where the 1916, first 1918 and second 1918 Battles of the Somme took place during the First World War. The Museum of the Great War (known in French as the Historial de la Grande Guerre) is located in the château.

== Geography ==
Péronne is situated in the old region of Santerre, home of the early French kings. It is located in the Somme valley.

The autoroutes A1 and A16 pass close by. The national road, the N17, traverses the town.

== Demography ==
Historical population
Year	Pop.	±% p.a.
1968	7,146	—
1975	8,568	+2.63%
1982	9,129	+0.91%
1990	8,497	−0.89%
1999	8,380	−0.15%
2007	8,155	−0.34%
2012	7,737	−1.05%
2017	7,579	−0.41%
2023	7,090	−1.11%
Source: INSEE

== History ==
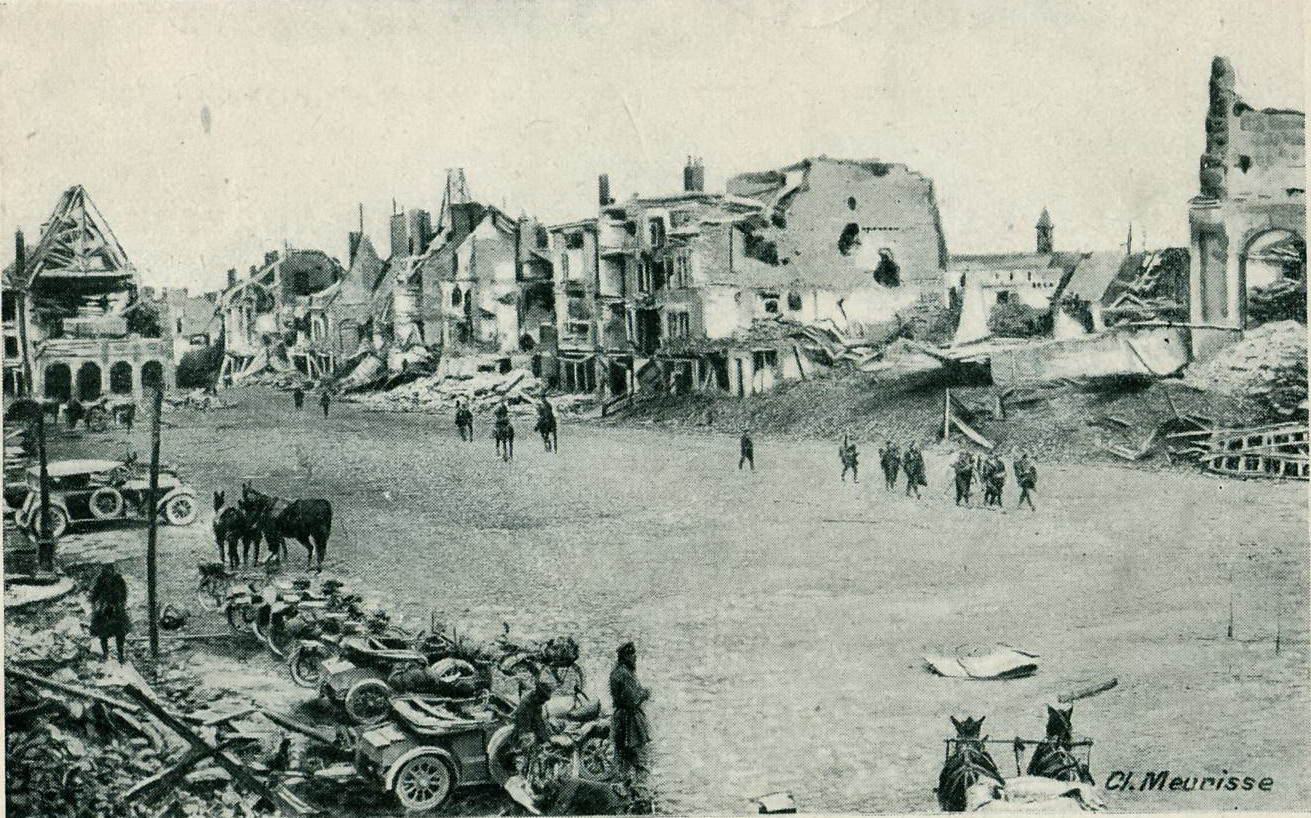
The ruined main square of Péronne after the First World War

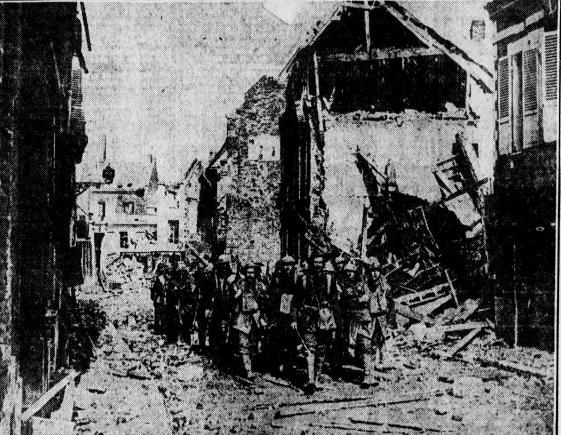
German soldiers running through the town's ruins in 1918.

On a hill, dominating the Somme river and its lakes, Péronne was a well-fortified place during the early Middle Ages. The ramparts were built in the 9th century. All that remains today of the ancient fortress is the Porte de Bretagne.

Few towns have been as involved in the history of France, few towns so often devastated, as Péronne. Burned and pillaged in the time of the Normans; gravely damaged during the time of the Spanish occupation; devastated by the Germans in 1870; totally destroyed in 1917; bombarded and burned in May 1940 by the German airforce. Péronne was awarded two Croix de Guerre and the Légion d'honneur:

- King Charles the Simple, prisoner of Rudolph, Duke of Burgundy died here, a captive in the dungeons, in 929. He was buried in the abbey.
- In the 12th century, Philippe II built the towers of the château, surrounded by ditches, with a portcullis to defend the main gate.
- In 1468, Charles the Bold, Duke of Burgundy forced a treaty from Louis XI, who was held prisoner in the castle. Much land was ceded, but eventually won back by Louis.
- In 1536, Charles Quint unsuccessfully besieged the town. Catherine of Poix, also known as “Marie Fouré" led the defence of the town, throwing a Spaniard off the top of the wall.
- On 14 September 1641, Louis XIII and Honoré II, Prince of Monaco signed a treaty at Péronne, placing the principality of Monaco under the protection of France.
- On 26 June 1815 following the Battle of Waterloo, a garrison of 1,500 National Guard in the town surrendered to the advancing Allied Army.
- There was a motor-racing circuit southeast of the town in the 1920s and 1930s which held the Grand Prix de Picardie organised by the Automobile Club de Picardie et de l'Aisne.

== Social Housing ==
In September 2025, the municipality will launch an ambitious renovation project for 88 social housing units in the Chapelette district.

== Places and monuments ==
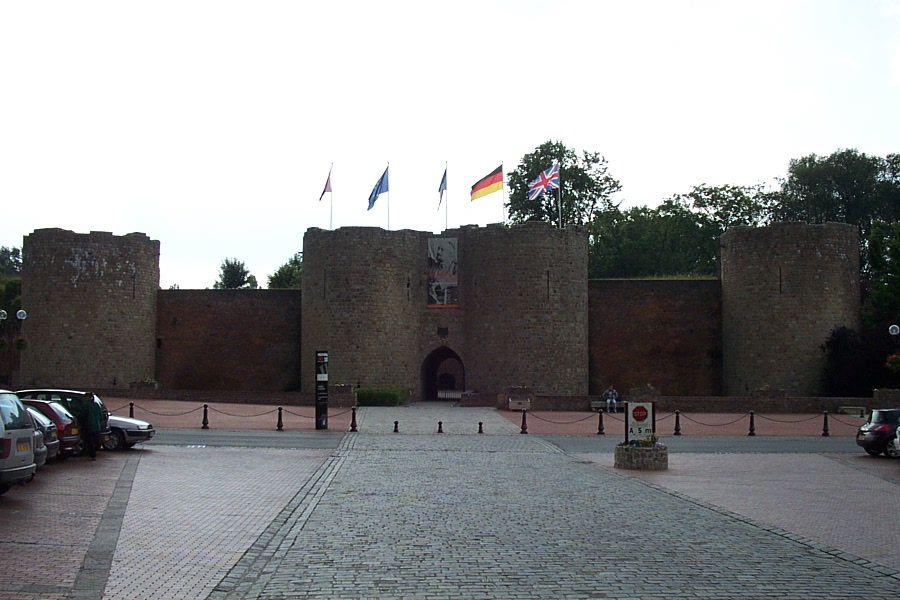
Château de Péronne entrance

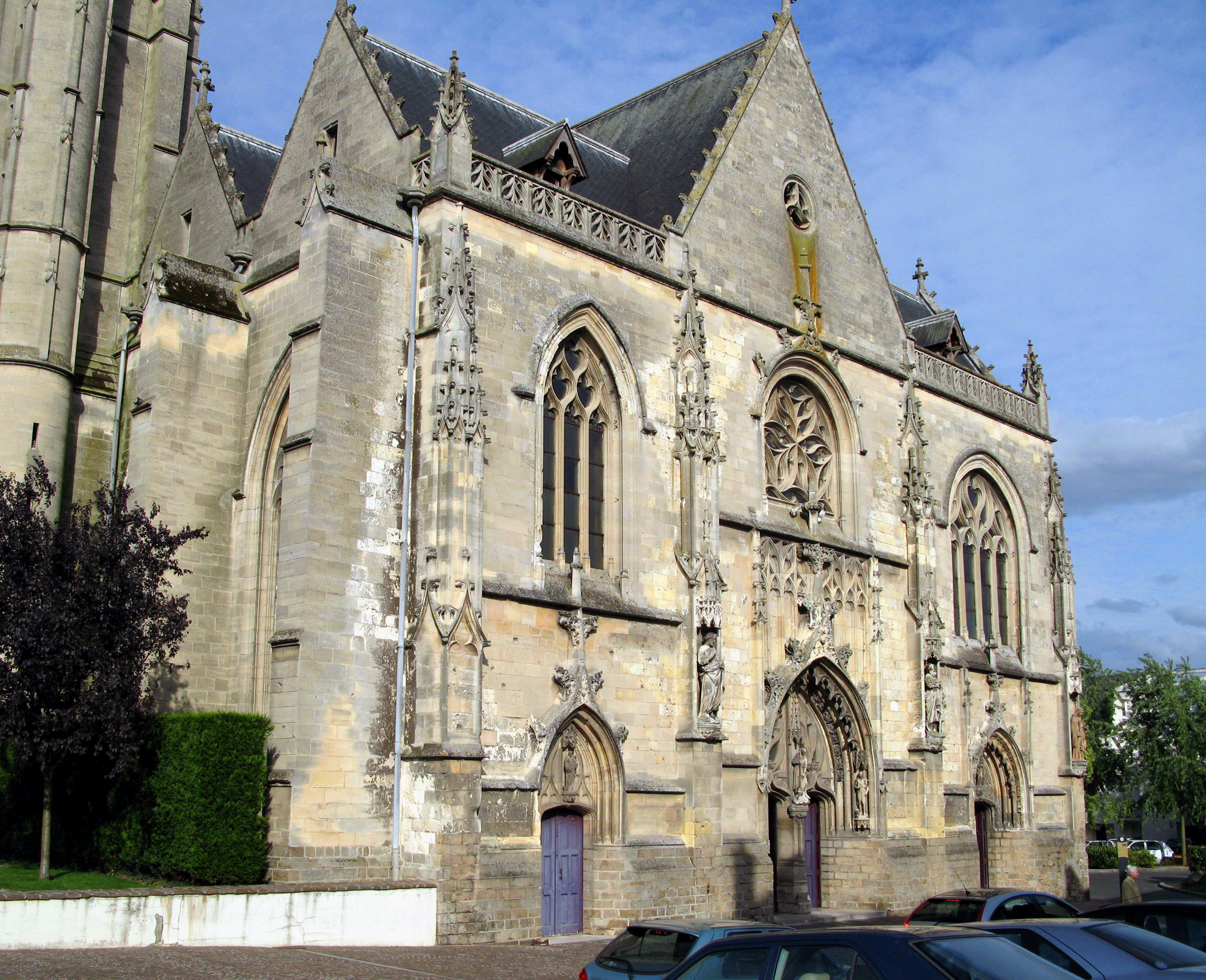
West front of Saint-Jean-Baptiste

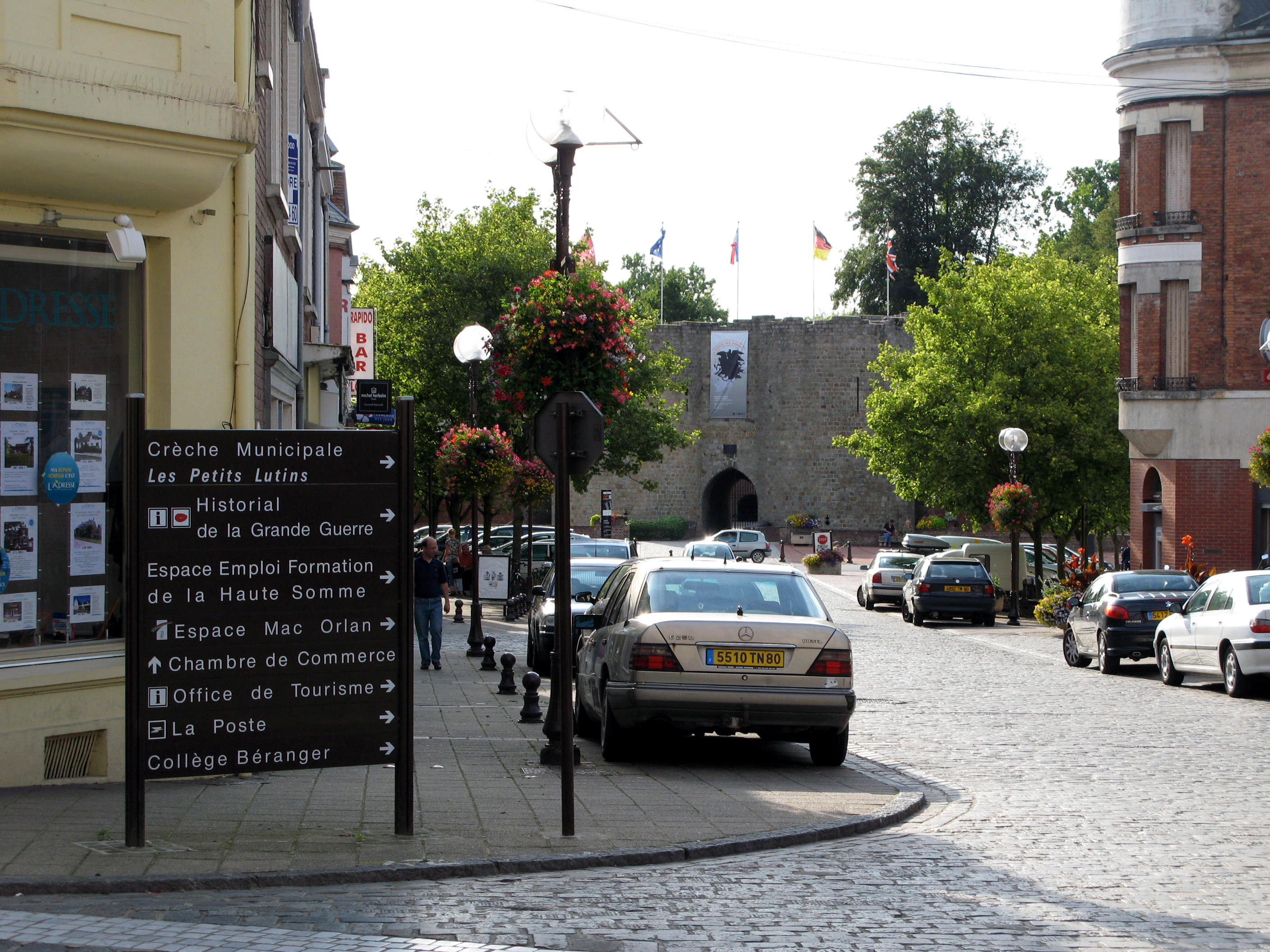
Rue Louis XI

- Église Saint-Jean-Baptiste de Péronne: Destroyed between 1914 and 1918, then slightly damaged in 1944, the west front, is built in "gothique flamboyant" style.
- In front of the church stands the statue of Marie Fouré, a local heroine.
- Danicourt Museum (named for former mayor Charles Alfred Danicourt), founded in the Hôtel-de-ville in 1877, is the only museum of the Somme to have been pillaged and destroyed by the Germans between 1916 and 1918. It lost 98% of its collection. A few archeological treasures were saved by the museum curator, who hid them from the Germans when they took the town in 1914. These treasures were again subject to German interest in 1941. Overlooked by the first reconstruction in 1955, it was not until the second reconstruction of the building that the museum was back in use. Its founder, the former mayor Charles Alfred Danicourt, created the museum as a cultural beacon of the Somme ca. 1900. Nowadays, one can find one of the finest collections of early Gallic coins, antique gold jewelry, Merovingian funeral artefacts, a panorama of sand production during prehistoric times and some local examples of 19th- and 20th-century paintings.
- The city of Péronne is equally known for its "Monument to the Dead", the work of the architect Louis Faille, representing a Picardy woman with clenched fist raised above the body of her son or husband killed by the war.
- Monument of the Sailor Delpas, recalling the defence of the city and its fall at the time of the Franco-Prussian War in the winter 1870–1871.
- The Australian Monument recalls the heroic actions in a neighbourhood of the town by Australian soldiers in 1918.
- The Brittany Gate, with its strengthened stonework, is reminiscent of the defensive aspect of Péronne
- The Château de Péronne is a largely ruined castle, classified as a monument historique by the French Ministry of Culture.
- Within the walls of the ancient château, nowadays run by the Somme département, the "Historial de la Grande Guerre" museum is a ‘must visit’ for those interested in the Great War. Created in 1992, by architect Henri Ciriani, it illustrates the development of the conflict. The building is characterised by the stark whiteness of the cement, inset with small cylinders, symbolic of military graves.
- Mont Saint-Quentin

== Notable people ==
- Pierre-Jean de Béranger
- Jean-Pierre Demailly
- Saint Fursey, patron saint of the town
- Louis-Mathieu Langlès
- Louis XI
- Pierre Mac Orlan
- Francis Tattegrain

== Twin towns – sister cities ==
Péronne is twinned with:

- Blackburn, England
- Altena, Germany
- Salobreña, Spain
- Albany, Australia

== See also ==
- Communes of the Somme department
