= Château de Péronne =

Castle in Hauts-de-France, France

Coordinates: 49°55′45″N 2°55′55″E

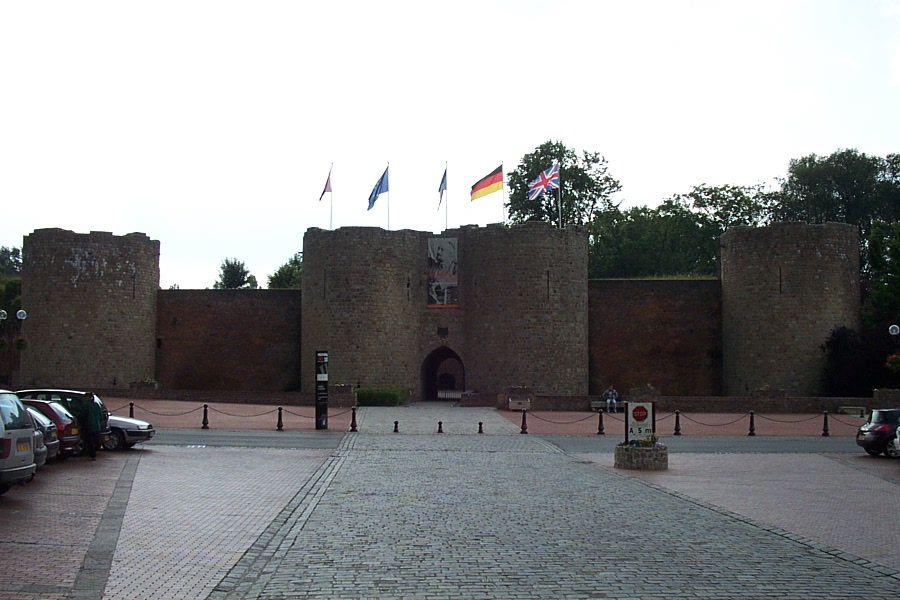
Château de Péronne entrance

The Château de Péronne is a partly ruined castle in the commune of Péronne in the Somme département of France.

It consists of the ruins of three towers and the curtain walls connecting them.

The castle is the property of the commune. It has been listed since 1924 as a monument historique by the French Ministry of Culture. Within the castle is the Historial de la Grande Guerre, a museum of the First World War.

== See also ==
- List of castles in France
