= Historiography of World War I =

Area of study on 1914–1918 conflict

The first tentative efforts to comprehend the meaning and consequences of modern warfare began during the initial phases of World War I; this process continued throughout and after the end of hostilities, and is still underway more than a century later. Teaching World War I has presented special challenges. When compared with World War II, the First World War is often thought to be "a wrong war fought for the wrong reasons"; it lacks the metanarrative of good versus evil that characterizes retellings of the Second World War. Lacking recognizable heroes and villains, it is often taught thematically, invoking tropes like the wastefulness of war, the folly of generals and the innocence of soldiers. The complexity of the conflict is mostly obscured by these oversimplifications. George Kennan referred to the war as the "seminal catastrophe of the 20th century".

Historian Heather Jones argues that the historiography has been reinvigorated by a cultural turn in the 21st century. Scholars have raised entirely new questions regarding military occupation, radicalisation of politics, race, medical science, gender and mental health. Among the major subjects that historians have long debated regarding the war include: Why the war began; why the Allies won; whether generals were responsible for high casualty rates; how soldiers endured the poor conditions of trench warfare; and to what extent the civilian home front accepted and endorsed the war effort.

== Causes of the war ==
European diplomatic alignments shortly before the war. The Ottomans joined the Central Powers shortly after the war started, with Bulgaria joining the following year. Italy remained neutral in 1914 and joined the Allies in 1915.

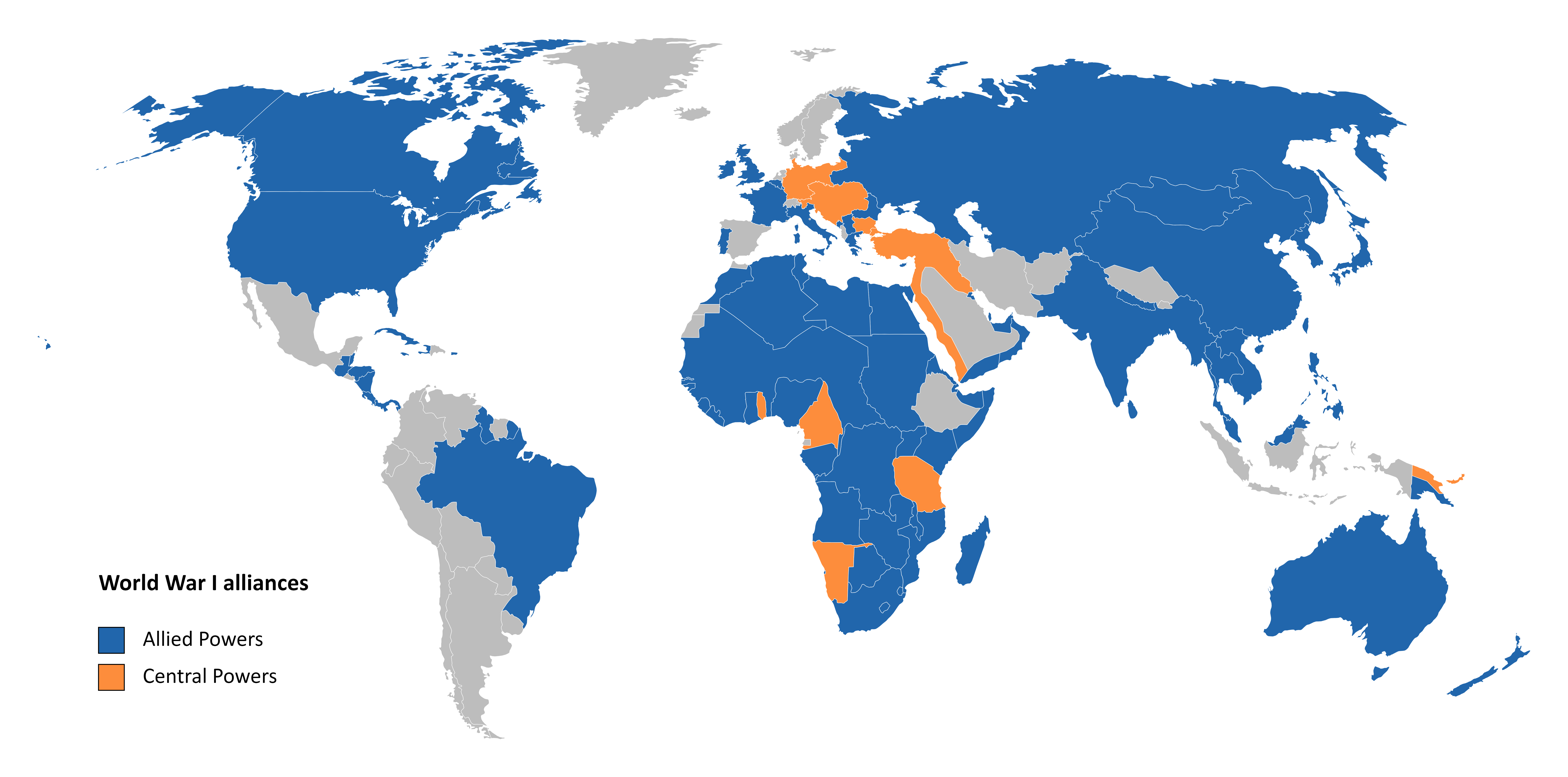
Map of the world with participants in World War I after U.S. entry (6 April 1917), but before the October Revolution (7 November 1917): Allied Powers (Entente) Central Powers Neutral countries

Identifying the causes of World War I remains a debated issue. World War I began in the Balkans on 28 July 1914, and hostilities ended on 11 November 1918, leaving 17 million dead and 25 million wounded. Moreover, the Russian Civil War can in many ways be considered a continuation of World War I, as can various other conflicts in the direct aftermath of 1918.

Scholars looking at the long term seek to explain why two rival sets of powers (the German Empire, Austria-Hungary, and the Ottoman Empire against the Russian Empire, France, and the British Empire) came into conflict by the start of 1914. They look at such factors as political, territorial and economic competition; militarism, a complex web of alliances and alignments; imperialism, the growth of nationalism; and the power vacuum created by the decline of the Ottoman Empire. Other important long-term or structural factors that are often studied include unresolved territorial disputes, the perceived breakdown of the European balance of power, convoluted and fragmented governance, arms races and security dilemmas, a cult of the offensive, and military planning.

Scholars seeking short-term analysis focus on the summer of 1914 and ask whether the conflict could have been stopped, or instead whether deeper causes made it inevitable. Among the immediate causes were the decisions made by statesmen and generals during the July Crisis, which was triggered by the assassination of Archduke Franz Ferdinand of Austria by the Bosnian Serb nationalist Gavrilo Princip, who had been supported by a nationalist organization in Serbia. The crisis escalated as the conflict between Austria-Hungary and Serbia was joined by their allies Russia, Germany, France, and ultimately Belgium and the United Kingdom. Other factors that came into play during the diplomatic crisis leading up to the war included misperceptions of intent (such as the German belief that Britain would remain neutral), the fatalistic belief that war was inevitable, and the speed with which the crisis escalated, partly due to delays and misunderstandings in diplomatic communications.

The crisis followed a series of diplomatic clashes among the Great Powers (Italy, France, Germany, United Kingdom, Austria-Hungary and Russia) over European and colonial issues in the decades before 1914 that had left tensions high. The cause of these public clashes can be traced to changes in the balance of power in Europe that had been taking place since 1867.

Consensus on the origins of the war remains elusive, since historians disagree on key factors and place differing emphasis on a variety of factors. That is compounded by historical arguments changing over time, particularly as classified historical archives become available, and as perspectives and ideologies of historians have changed. The deepest division among historians is between those who see Germany and Austria-Hungary as having driven events and those who focus on power dynamics among a wider set of actors and circumstances. Secondary fault lines exist between those who believe that Germany deliberately planned a European war, those who believe that the war was largely unplanned but was still caused principally by Germany and Austria-Hungary taking risks, and those who believe that some or all of the other powers (Russia, France, Serbia, United Kingdom) played a more significant role in causing the war than has been traditionally suggested.

=== "Web of alliances" narratives ===
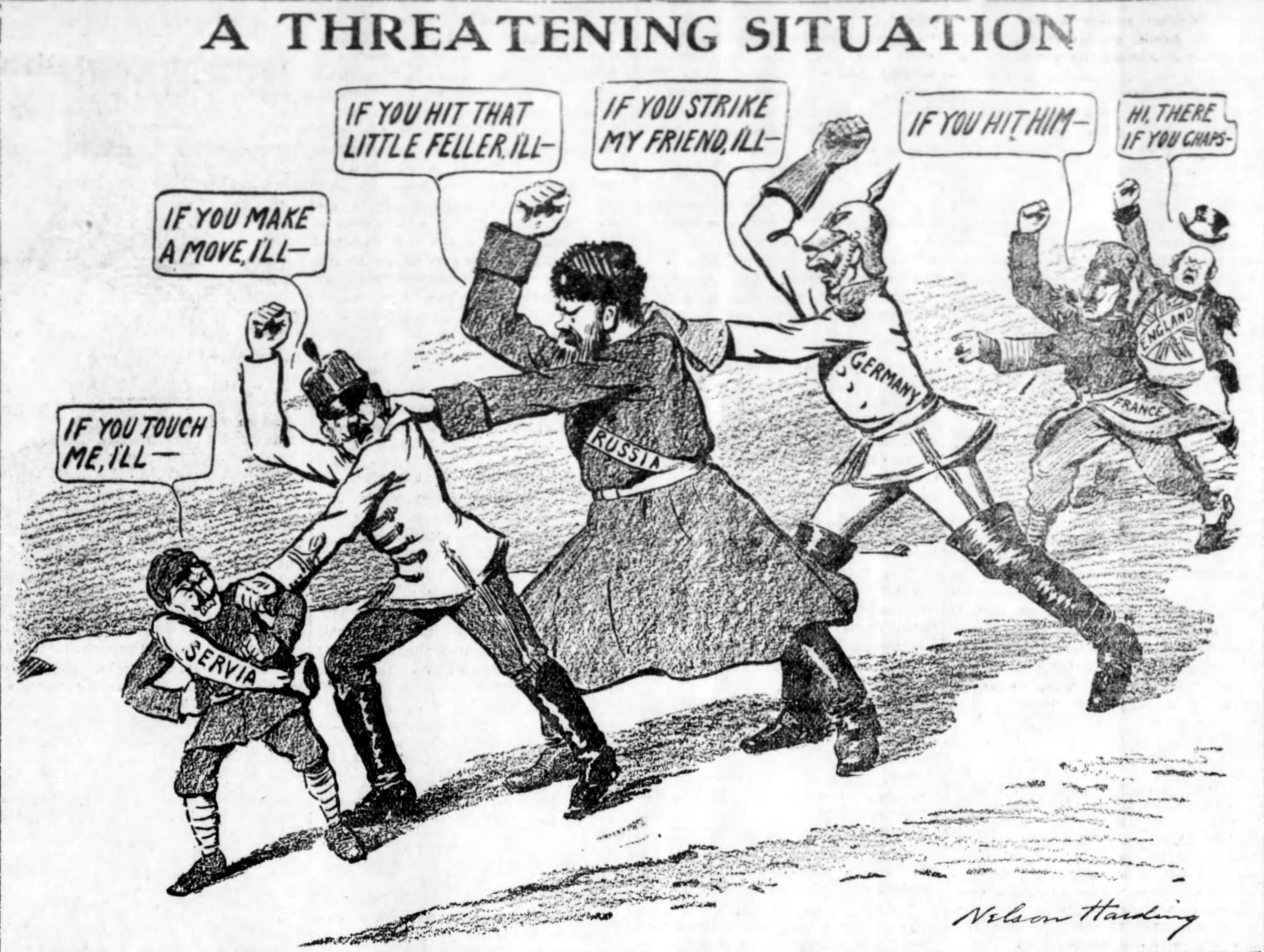
"A Threatening Situation", an American editorial cartoon depicting the supposed web of alliances. The caption reads, "If Austria attacks Serbia, Russia will fall upon Austria, Germany upon Russia, and France and England upon Germany." That dimension developed into the concept of chain ganging.

Although general narratives of the war tend to emphasize the importance of alliances in binding the major powers to act in the event of a crisis such as the July Crisis, historians such as Margaret MacMillan warn against the argument that alliances forced the Great Powers to act as they did: "What we tend to think of as fixed alliances before the First World War were nothing of the sort. They were much more loose, much more porous, much more capable of change."

The most important alliances in Europe required participants to agree to collective defence if they were attacked. Some represented formal alliances, but the Triple Entente represented only a frame of mind:

- German-Austrian Treaty (1879)
- The Franco-Russian Alliance (1894)
- The addition of Italy to the Germany and Austrian alliance in 1882, forming the Triple Alliance
- Treaty of London, 1839, guaranteeing the neutrality of Belgium

There are three notable exceptions that demonstrate that alliances did not in themselves force the great powers to act:

- The Entente Cordiale between Britain and France in 1905 included a secret agreement that left the northern coast of France and the English Channel to be defended by the British Royal Navy, and the separate "entente" between Britain and Russia (1907) formed the so-called Triple Entente. However, the Triple Entente did not, in fact, force Britain to mobilise because it was not a military treaty.
- Moreover, general narratives of the war regularly misstate that Russia was allied to Serbia. Clive Ponting noted: "Russia had no treaty of alliance with Serbia and was under no obligation to support it diplomatically, let alone go to its defence."
- Italy, despite being part of the Triple Alliance, did not enter the war to defend the Triple Alliance partners.

== Cultural memory in the United Kingdom ==
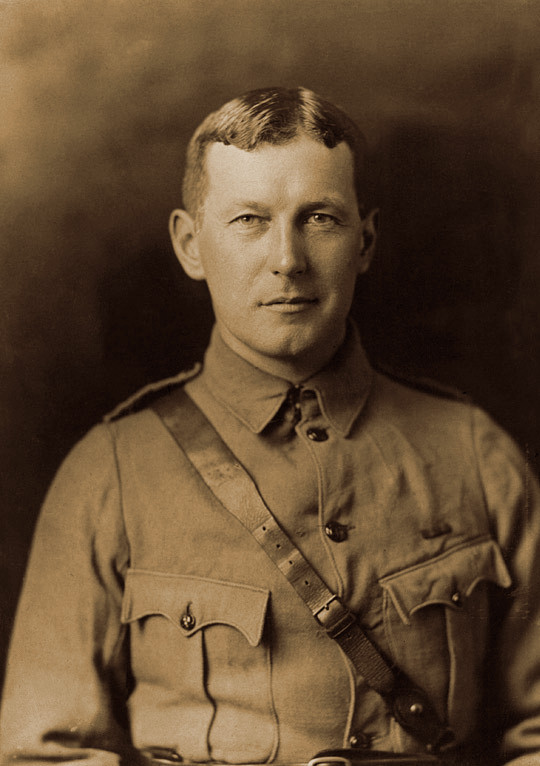
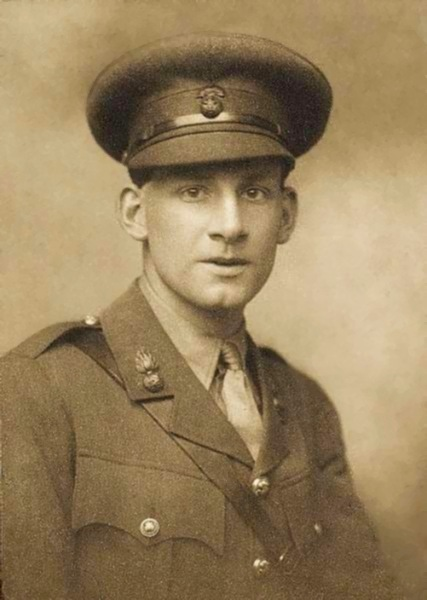
Left: John McCrae, author of In Flanders Fields
Right: Siegfried Sassoon

World War I had a lasting impact on collective memory of the United Kingdom. It was seen by many in Britain as signalling the end of an era of stability stretching back to the Victorian period, and across Europe many regarded it as a watershed. Historian Samuel Hynes explained:

A generation of innocent young men, their heads full of high abstractions like Honour, Glory and England, went off to war to make the world safe for democracy. They were slaughtered in stupid battles planned by stupid generals. Those who survived were shocked, disillusioned and embittered by their war experiences, and saw that their real enemies were not the Germans, but the old men at home who had lied to them. They rejected the values of the society that had sent them to war, and in doing so separated their own generation from the past and from their cultural inheritance.

This has become the most common perception of World War I, perpetuated by the art, cinema, poems, and stories published subsequently. Films such as All Quiet on the Western Front, Paths of Glory and King and Country have perpetuated the idea, while war-time films including Camrades, Poppies of Flanders, and Shoulder Arms indicate that the most contemporary views of the war were overall far more positive. Likewise, the art of Paul Nash, John Nash, Christopher Nevinson, and Henry Tonks in Britain painted a negative view of the conflict in keeping with the growing perception, while popular war-time artists such as Muirhead Bone painted more serene and pleasant interpretations subsequently rejected as inaccurate. Several historians like John Terraine, Niall Ferguson and Gary Sheffield have challenged these interpretations as partial and polemical views:

These beliefs did not become widely shared because they offered the only accurate interpretation of wartime events. In every respect, the war was much more complicated than they suggest. In recent years, historians have argued persuasively against almost every popular cliché of World War I. It has been pointed out that, although the losses were devastating, their greatest impact was socially and geographically limited. The many emotions other than horror experienced by soldiers in and out of the front line, including comradeship, boredom, and even enjoyment, have been recognised. The war is not now seen as a 'fight about nothing', but as a war of ideals, a struggle between aggressive militarism and more or less liberal democracy. It has been acknowledged that British generals were often capable men facing difficult challenges and that it was under their command that the British army played a major part in the defeat of the Germans in 1918: a great forgotten victory.

Though these views have been discounted as "myths", they are common. They have dynamically changed according to contemporary influences, reflecting in the 1950s perceptions of the war as "aimless" following the contrasting Second World War and emphasising conflict within the ranks during times of class conflict in the 1960s. The majority of additions to the contrary are often rejected. Writers such as Ernest Hemingway wrote many stories on the experiences of veterans after the war, such as the short story Soldier's Home, about young veteran Harold Krebs trying to integrate back into society.

== Discontent in Germany and Austria ==
The rise of Nazism and fascism included a revival of the nationalist spirit and a rejection of many post-war changes. Similarly, the popularity of the stab-in-the-back legend (German: Dolchstoßlegende) was a testament to the psychological state of defeated Germany, and was a rejection of responsibility for the conflict. This conspiracy theory of the betrayal of the German war effort by Jews became common, and the German populace came to see themselves as victims. The widespread acceptance of the "stab-in-the-back" myth delegitimised the Weimar government and destabilised the system, opening it to extremes of right and left. The same occurred in Austria, which did not consider itself responsible for the outbreak of the war, and claimed not to have suffered a military defeat.

== Enabling the rise of totalitarianism ==
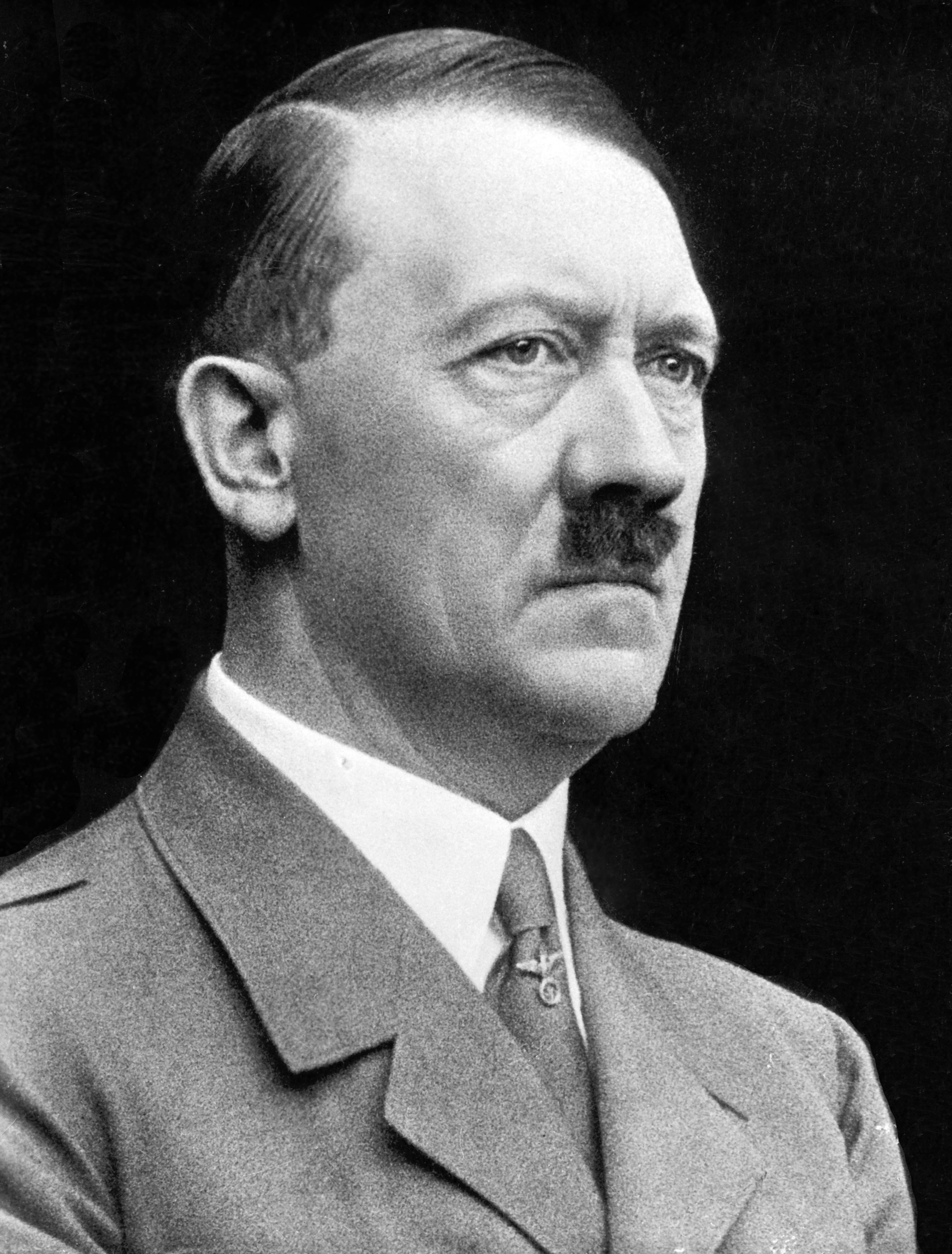
Adolf Hitler

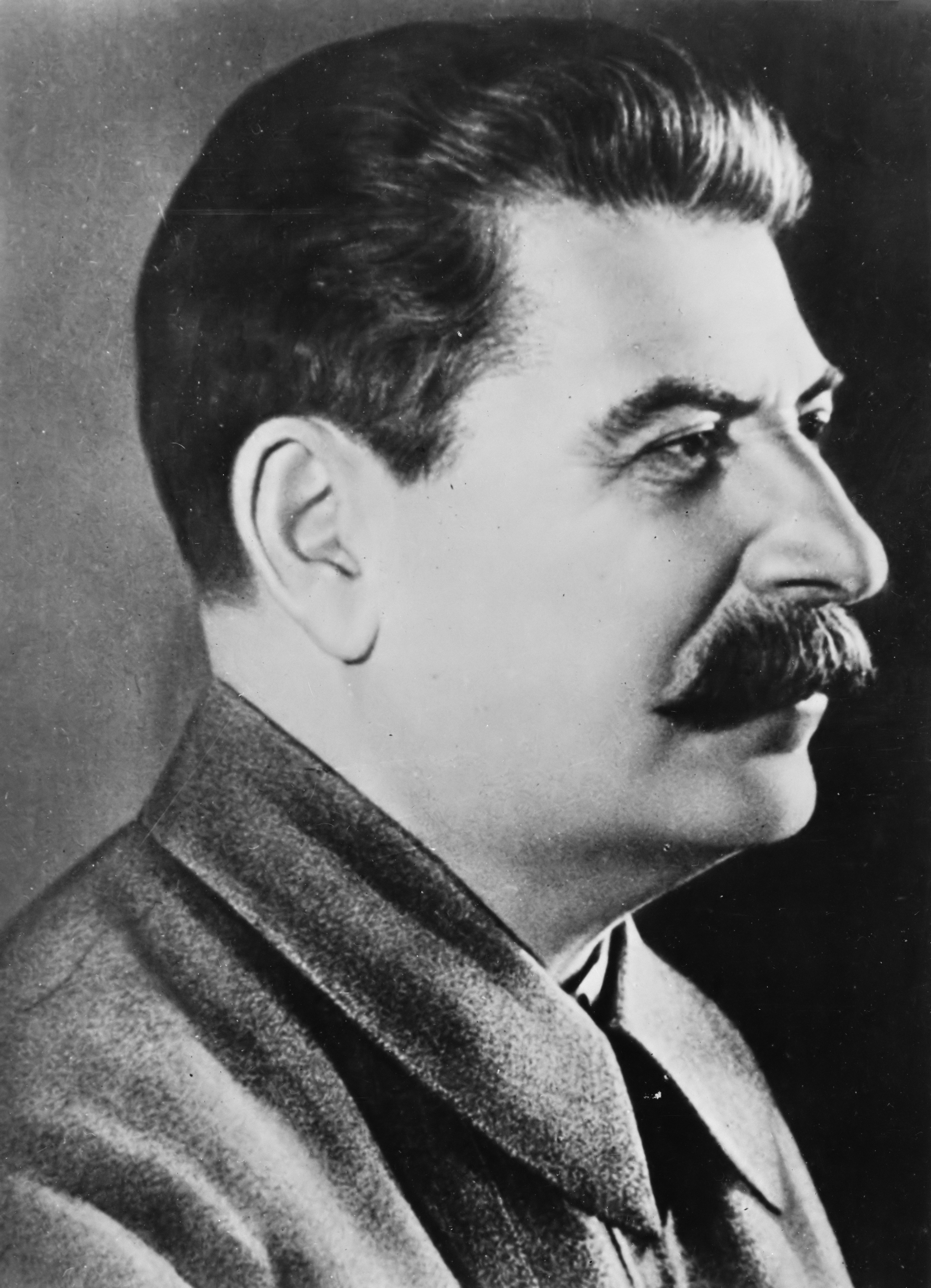
Joseph Stalin

Communist and fascist movements around Europe drew strength from the societal upheaval caused by the war, and enjoyed new levels of popularity. These feelings were most pronounced in areas directly or harshly affected by the war where centuries-old royal dynasties were toppled, such as the Weimar Republic (1918-1933), Russian Civil War (1917-1923), and the successor states of Austria-Hungary. Adolf Hitler was able to gain popularity by using German discontent with the still controversial Treaty of Versailles. World War II was, in part, a continuation of the power struggle never fully resolved by World War I. Furthermore, it was common for Germans in the 1930s to justify acts of aggression due to perceived injustices imposed by the victors of World War I. American historian William Rubinstein wrote that:

The 'Age of Totalitarianism' included nearly all the infamous examples of genocide in modern history, headed by the Jewish Holocaust, but also comprising the mass murders and purges of the Communist world, other mass killings carried out by Nazi Germany and its allies, and also the Armenian Genocide of 1915. All these slaughters, it is argued here, had a common origin, the collapse of the elite structure and normal modes of government of much of central, eastern and southern Europe as a result of World War I, without which surely neither Communism nor Fascism would have existed except in the minds of unknown agitators and crackpots.

== Social trauma ==
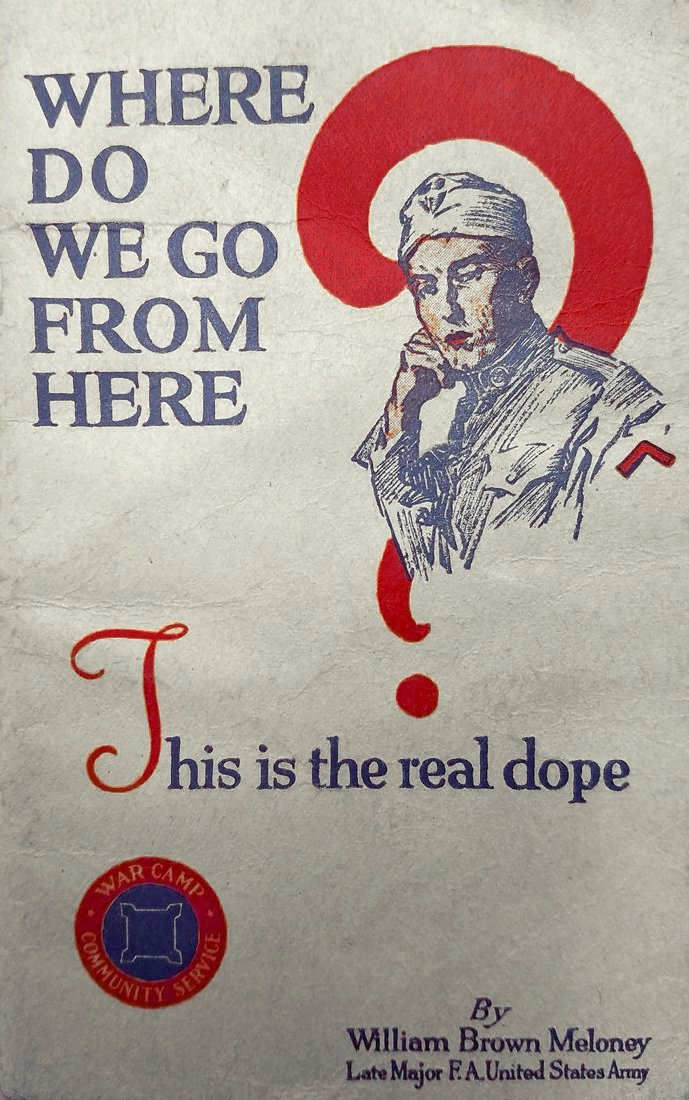
A 1919 book for veterans, from the US War Department

The social trauma caused by unprecedented rates of casualties manifested itself in different ways, which have been the subject of subsequent historical debate. Over 8 million Europeans died in the war. Millions suffered permanent disabilities. The war gave birth to fascism and Bolshevism and toppled the centuries-old dynasties that had ruled the Ottoman, Habsburg, Russian and German Empires.

The optimism of la belle époque was destroyed, and those who had fought in the war were referred to as the Lost Generation. For years afterward, people mourned the dead, the missing, and the many disabled. Many soldiers returned with severe trauma, suffering from shell shock (also called neurasthenia, a condition related to post-traumatic stress disorder). Many more returned home with few after-effects; however, their silence about the war contributed to the conflict's growing mythological status. Though many participants did not share in the experiences of combat or spend any significant time at the front, or had positive memories of their service, the images of suffering and trauma became the widely shared perception. Such historians as Dan Todman, Paul Fussell, and Samuel Heyns have all published works since the 1990s arguing that these common perceptions of the war are factually incorrect.

== See also ==
- Bibliography of World War I § Historiography and memory
- Historiography of World War II
- World War I in popular culture
- Juvenile books on "Air Service Boys" (6 at 1918-1920)
