= Museum of the Great War =

Museum in Péronne, France

Coordinates: 49°55′45″N 2°55′51″E

The Museum of the Great War (French: Historial de la Grande Guerre), located near the heart of the World War I Somme battlefields, is housed within the Château de Péronne, a castle in the town of Péronne, France. Péronne was under German occupation during the war, and inhabitants of it suffered a lot because their town was almost completely destroyed. The museum looks mostly at the Great War, and the years just before and just after. It strives to place war in a social context, stressing "the common suffering of the combatants" and "the civilians, who were equally mobilised by the war effort". It is the largest museum in Europe about the First World War. It represents the everyday life of the soldiers at the front during that harsh time as well as the life of the civilians and the huge social changes. The museum is well known for its efforts to present the battles at the Somme from the viewpoints of all nations that fought there. To do this it established an independent international research center. This association consists of a steering committee and a scientific committee that include many prominent historians and experts on the First World War.

Additionally, it has two major permanent specialist exhibits:

Prisoners of War

According to museum research, 500,000 French, 160,000 British and (in June 1916) 85,000 Germans were prisoners of war. By including displaced and detained civilians, this figure rises to 6.6 million. The exhibition deals with all aspects of captivity: the food, for example, was insufficient and of poor quality; illness was rife; and prisoners of war were required to work hard.

Children in World War I

For some, World War I was seen as a means of defending civilisation against barbarism, to protect the future of children. The image of the child was thus frequently used in posters, notably for recruitment. Children, too, were the target of propaganda. School books of the period often dwelt on patriotic duty for future soldiers and future nurses. Simplified versions of soldiers, sailors and nurses became popular for children and toys took on a military air.

There is another museum with a similar name, near Paris, called the Musée de la Grande Guerre du Pays de Meaux (in French).

== See also ==
- Historiography of World War I
- Patriotic consent
