= Spartaco Fontanot =

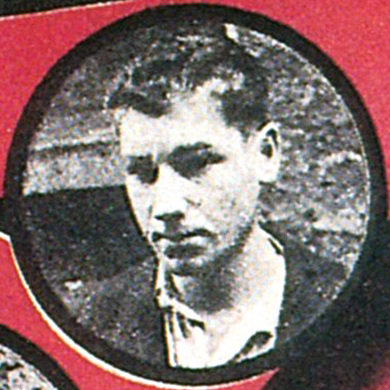
- Spartaco Fontanot on L'Affiche Rouge
- Born: 17 January 1922; Monfalcone, Italy
- Died: 21 February 1944 (aged 22); Fort Mont Valérien, France
- Cause of death: Execution by firing squad
- Military career
- Allegiance: Italy, France
- Service: French Liberation Army
- Known for: Member of the Affiche Rouge Resistance group
- Conflicts: World War II, French Resistance

Spartaco Fontanot (17 January 1922 – 21 February 1944) was one of the members of the French resistance shot at Mont Valérien as a member of the Manouchian group. He was an Italian volunteer soldier in the French liberation army FTP-MOI. His name is one of the ten featured on the "affiche rouge", the propaganda poster displayed by the Germans during the trial of the 23 members of the Manouchian group. His photograph is also on the poster, with the caption "Fontanot, Italian communist, 12 attacks".

== Early years ==
Spartaco Fontanot was born on 17 January in Monfalcone, in the province of Gorizia in Friuli-Venezia Giulia, Italy. He arrived in France at the age of two, his antifascist parents having been obliged to leave Italy when Benito Mussolini came to power.

After elementary school, he took classes at the technical college of Puteaux, which he left with a "certificate of professional aptitude" as a fitter, turner, and draftsman. His wish was to become an engineer, but his parents were not able to help him pursue his studies, and he started at a small factory as a turner. He still harbored the ambition to become an engineer by taking night classes at the École des Arts et Métiers in Paris.

== Second World War ==
At the time of the German occupation in 1941, Fontano quickly devoted himself to the armed struggle, and, in 1942, he volunteered for the FTP's immigrant section in the Paris region, a part of the French forces of the interior (FFI). Unable to divide his efforts, he stopped taking night courses.

In March 1943, the police came to arrest his father and sister. A wanted man, he was forced to quit his parental home.

He took part in numerous attacks and sabotages against the occupying forces and against German officers, notably at Rueil, Place de la Concorde, and even bus stations. Of note are the assassination operations he undertook against fr:Julius Ritter, and against General von Schaumburg, the commandant of greater Paris. He also sabotaged many electricity pylons and was rated as an excellent shot. Because of his command experience as the head of an operational detachment under the command of Missak Manouchian, he was appointed lieutenant in the French Forces of the Interior, the FFI (Forces Françaises de l'Intérieur).

Arrested in Paris by the police on 13 November 1943, Fontano did not give them any information. He was transferred to Fresnes prison and sentenced by the military court; his execution took place on 21 February 1944 at Mont Valérien along with 21 of his comrades.

Spartaco Fontanot was one of three heroes in his family; Jacques Fontanot (18 years old) and Nérone Fontanot also gave their lives for the liberation of France.

== More important details ==
- Main-d'œuvre immigrée
- Francs-tireurs et partisans - Main-d'œuvre immigrée
- Affiche rouge
- Brigades Spéciales
- Geheime Feld Polizei

== Bibliography ==
- (in French) FFI - FTPF, Pages de gloire des vingt-trois, Immigration, 1951.

== External links that are in french ==
- (in French) La journée d'un "Terroriste"
- (in French) Discours d'André SANTINI et Henry KARAYAN
