= Maurice Fingercwajg =

French resistance member

- Mojsze Fingercweig
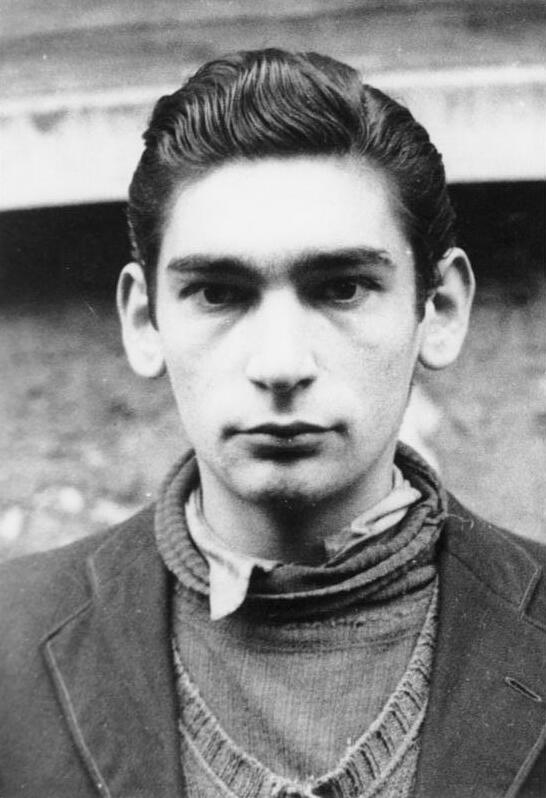
- Portrait preserved in the German Federal Archives attributed to Fingercwajg, through its resemblance to his likeness in the Affiche rouge propaganda poster
- Born: December 25, 1923; Warsaw, Warsaw Voivodeship, Second Polish Republic
- Died: February 21, 1944 (aged 20) Fort Mont-Valérien, Paris, Military Administration in France
- Cause of death: Execution by firing squad
- Military career
- Allegiance: PCF
- Branch: FTP
- Unit: FTP-MOI

Maurice Fingercwajg also Mojsze Fingercweig (25 December 1923 in Warsaw – 21 February 1944 in Mont Valérien), was a volunteer soldier in the French liberation army FTP-MOI and a member of the group of Missak Manouchian. He was one of the resistance fighters shot at Fort Mont Valérien.

== Biography ==
Fingercwajg was born on 25 December 1923 in Warsaw, Poland. He was less than three years old when his parents settled in Paris. His father, a tailor, worked hard to feed his family. The young Maurice went to school and could have been a happy child were it not for the loss of his mother at the age of ten. Despite his youth, he worked as an upholsterer. Fingercwajg's elder brother Jacques was a member of the Jeunesse Communiste and influenced him greatly. In 1940 Fingercwajg in his turn joined the Jeunesse Communiste, where he became very active.

When the second Jewish detachment of the FTP immigrés was formed in the spring of 1942, Maurice was one of the first fighters. His bravery and devotion led to his being transferred to the elite derailment teams under the command of Missak Manouchian, where he carried out many audacious operations.

Fingercwajg's father and two brothers, Jacques and Léon, were deported during the great round-ups of Jews; he was left alone in the world and with the antifascist fighters as his only family. In November 1943, he was arrested along with his leader, Manouchian, and handed over with his other brothers in arms to the tribunal known as the procès des 23 (trial of the 23). Sentenced to death, he was shot at the Fort Mont Valérien on 21 February 1944.

== Affiche rouge ==
Fingercwajg's name appeared on the Affiche Rouge German propaganda poster, with the caption Fingercwajg, Juif polonais, 3 attentats, 5 déraillements (Fingercwajg, Polish Jew, 3 attacks, 5 derailments).

== See also ==
- Main-d'œuvre immigrée
- Francs-tireurs et partisans - Main-d'œuvre immigrée
- Affiche rouge
- Brigades Spéciales
- Geheime Feld Polizei

== Bibliography ==
- (in French) FFI - FTPF, Pages de gloire des vingt-trois, Immigration, 1951.
