= Robert Witchitz =

French resistance member

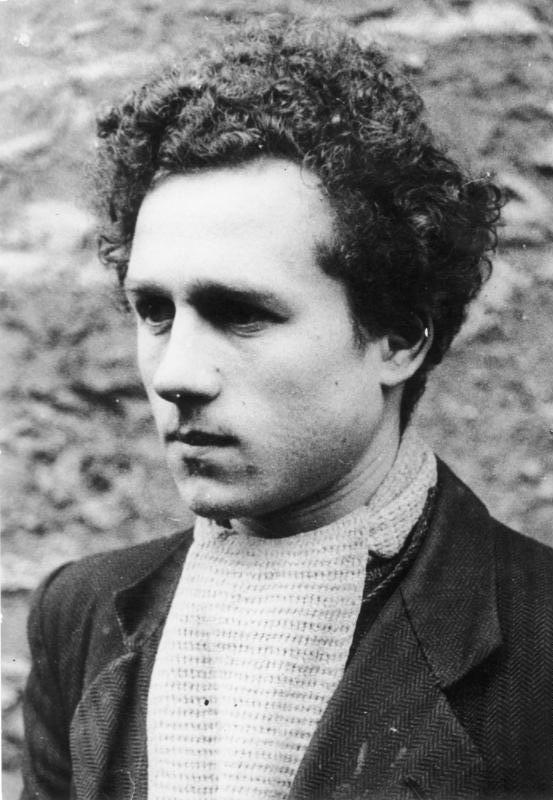
Robert Witchitz

Robert Witchitz (5 August 1924, in Abscon – 21 February 1944, in Mont Valérien) was a volunteer soldier in the French liberation force FTP-MOI in the group of Missak Manouchian.

== Biography ==
=== Youth ===
Witchitz was born on 5 August in Abscon, in the Nord department, to a miner of Polish origin and a French woman. He was brought up by his grandparents, staying in his village of birth until the age of five, then moving to the Paris region where he attended a secular school.

=== Second World War ===
At the beginning of the war, Witchitz' father was mobilised, and Witchitz became a telegrapher. Witchitz' father was taken prisoner but released on grounds of his service in the first world war. Robert was dismissed, and had to make runs by bicycle for a distillery, all while fighting for the Jeunesse communiste (communist youth), in Ivry-sur-Seine. Witchitz was assigned to the management of the Service du travail obligatoire to work in Germany.

Unbeknownst to his parents, he joined the FTP-MOI in February 1943. Each time he heard from the press or elsewhere of the death of a German or a collaborator, he rejoiced and remarked to his father that there were still men, and good Frenchmen. One morning at about 5am while Witchitz was at home, the police announced themselves outside. His parents recalled with anguish how he tried in vain to escape through the window. He asked his parents to let the officers in. When they saw him, they said "Is it you, Robert? You have two or three hours to get lost!". From then on, Witchitz' parents understood the kind of activity that their son was involved in.

On 12 October 1943, Witchitz was arrested after an operation against a German money transport. He forewarned his parents in a letter where he accused himself of having done something crazy, in order not to incriminate his fellows. He stayed in prison for exactly 100 days; his parents, though making frequent requests, were not authorised to visit him. Witchitz was handed over with his comrades to the tribunal (the procès des 23), and sentenced to death.

Witchitz' parents eventually did not receive authorization to visit him until the day after he had been shot at Mont Valérien on 21 February 1944 with 23 members of the Affiche Rouge. His body was laid in the square of the fallen in the Ivry-sur-Seine cemetery. Later, in accordance with his mother's wishes, it was moved to the family tomb.

In the short period of time during which he was active in the resistance, Robert took part in 13 operations.

Witchitz' name appeared on the German Affiche Rouge propaganda poster, with the caption: "Witchitz, Juif polonais, 15 attentats".

Nonetheless, it is unclear whether Witchitz was either Jewish or Polish.

== See also ==
- Main-d'œuvre immigrée
- Francs-tireurs et partisans - Main-d'œuvre immigrée
- Affiche rouge
- Brigades Spéciales
- Geheime Feld Polizei

== Bibliography ==
- (in French) FFI – FTPF, Pages de gloire des vingt-trois, Immigration, 1951.
