= Marcel Rajman =

Polish militant (1923–1944)

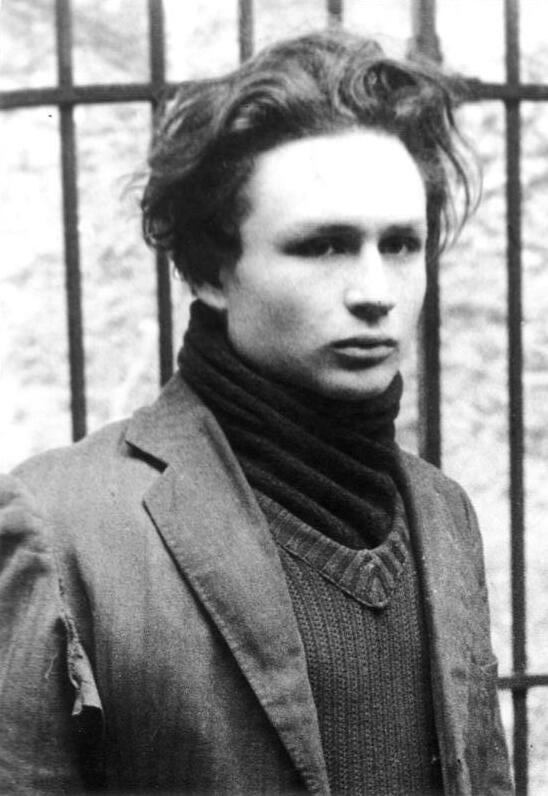
- Portrait conserved in the German Federal Archives, and reproduced in an identical pose in the Affiche rouge propaganda poster
- Born: 1 May 1923; Warsaw, Second Polish Republic
- Died: 21 February 1944 (aged 20); Fort Mont-Valérien, Paris, Occupied France
- Cause of death: Execution by firing squad
- Resting place: Ivry Cemetery, Ivry-sur-Seine
- Other names: Simon Maujean, Faculté, Michel, and Michel Mieczlav
- Organization: Main-d'œuvre immigrée
- Known for: role in the French Resistance

Marcel Rajman (alias Simon Maujean, Faculté, Michel, and Michel Mieczlav; 1 May 1923 − 21 February 1944) was a Polish Jew and volunteer fighter in the FTP-MOI group of French Resistance fighters during World War II. He was also the head of "Stalingrad", a highly active militant group.

== Biography ==
=== First years ===
Marcel Rajman was born on 1 May 1923 in Warsaw. He came to France with his parents at the age of eight. At ten, he joined the Pionniers and the working men's sports club YASK. Making up for lost time, he studied with ease and passed his brevet élémentaire aged 15. He started working with his parents, as a textile worker.

=== Second World War ===
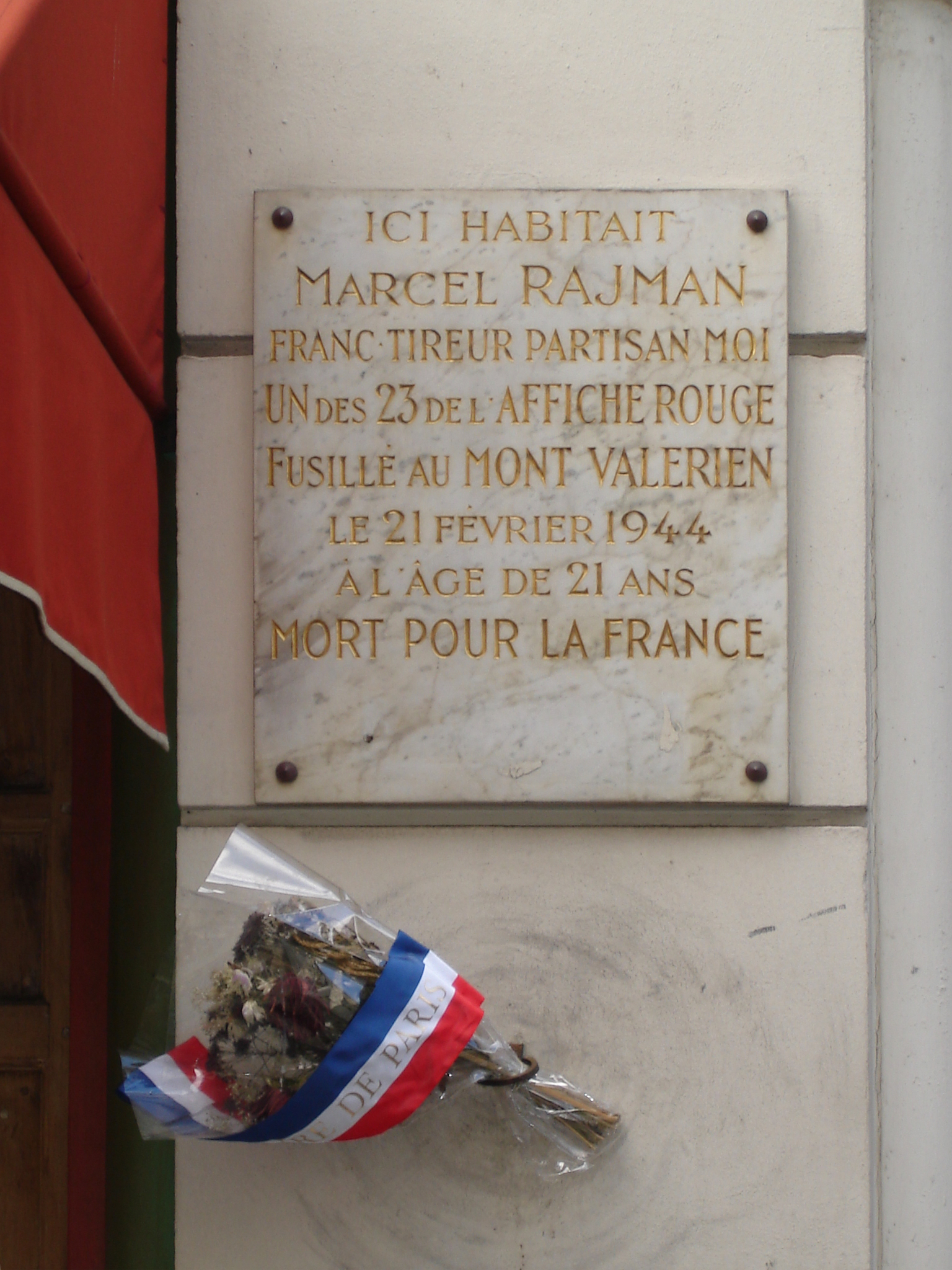
Commemorative plaque for Marcel Rajman at No. 1, rue des Immeubles-Industriels

After the first groups of the Jeunesses communistes were formed, Rajman readily joined them and fought actively until the beginning of 1942, participating in illegal demonstrations, putting up posters, leafleting and other activity. He became in charge of the Jeunesses communistes in the 11th arrondissement.

At the beginning of 1942, Rajman asked to join the 2nd Jewish division of the Francs-tireurs et partisans. He was accepted, distinguishing himself by bravery and intelligence. He was named to train new fighters, which role he gladly accepted. When the Czech grouping of the FTP was formed, he was sent to teach the partisans military skills. He was successful, and the first operation against the Germans at the Pont des Arts caused a big stir.

When the Armenian detachment was formed, Rajman was sent as an inspector. Notably, the first operation of Missak Manouchian, at Levallois, took place under Rajman's leadership.

On 15 June 1943, in front of the address 17 rue Mirabeau in the 16th arrondissement, Rajman and Ernest Blankopf threw a volley of grenades at a coach belonging to the Kriegsmarine. The Germans returned fire. Rajman, sought by all the police forces, managed to escape, while Blankopf was gravely wounded, and, not to be taken alive, shot himself in the head.

During summer 1943, the FTP-MOI decided to assassinate the commandant of Greater Paris, General von Schaumburg, who was responsible for signing the posters displayed in Paris announcing the execution of resistance members. Cristina Luca Boico, the Romanian who headed the FTP-MOI intelligence branch was ordered to collect information on Schaumburg. The FTP-MOI informants spotted him, a well groomed officer who rode on horseback to the Bois de Boulogne every day escorted by two guards. After his excursion, he went up the avenue Raphaël and into the courtyard of a luxurious hotel, before taking his official car which drove him to the hôtel Meurice. His journey being predictable, Rajman, Raymond Kojiski and Léo Kneller decided to act. On 28 July 1943, the three men attacked the car, throwing a grenade, and succeeded in getting away. However, they missed their target; furthermore, it was not von Schaumburg who was in the car on that day, but lieutenant colonel Moritz von Maliber, a high-ranking member of von Schaumburgs staff.

Thenceforth, Rajman became a major target, and his hideaway at rue de Belleville, Paris, was soon known to the Renseignements généraux. However, the RG preferred to prolong their surveillance in the hope that it would lead to more arrests.

In July and August 1943, the Brigades Spéciales n° 2 of the Renseignements généraux concentrated their efforts on the "terrorists" of the MOI. Rajman, in charge of the train derailing group and of execution, Missak Manouchian, the military commander, and Léo Kneller, a veteran fighter, were the most wanted men.

At the beginning of 1943, Lejb Goldberg – a fierce partisan since his parents were arrested and killed in the July 1942 Vel' d'Hiv Roundup (Rafle du Vélodrome d'Hiver) – was identified and followed to a particular address, 9b passage de Stinville. He left accompanied by Rajman, and they were followed by Inspector Constant of the RG.

By the end of the summer, almost all the MOI fighters has been spotted.

=== In enemy hands ===
Rajman was arrested by the Brigades Spéciales on 16 November 1943 at a rendezvous with Olga Bancic. He was indicted in the trial of the FTP-MOI members which took place on 17–18 February 1944. He was one of the ten fighters depicted on the Affiche rouge propaganda poster which was displayed throughout Paris. The German military tribunal sentenced him to death. He was shot at the fort Mont Valérien on 21 February 1944 along with 21 other members of the Manouchian group.

== Legacy ==
He is portrayed by actor Robinson Stévenin in the 2009 French film The Army of Crime directed by Robert Guédiguian.

== Portrait ==
Rajman's profile among the BS2 police read as follows: "Faculté: 19 ans, corpulence trapue, visage rond, cheveux châtain foncé, frisés et abondants, chandail bleu marine à col roulé, pardessus bleu à martingale, souliers noirs, porte une serviette sous le bras." (Faculté: 19 years old, stocky build, round face, thick curly dark brown hair, navy blue sweater with turtleneck, blue martingale overcoat, black shoes, carries a satchel under his arm.) Faculté was one of Rajman's pseudonyms.

Rajman's name appeared on the Affiche rouge German propaganda poster, with the following caption "Rayman, juif polonais, 13 attentats" (Rayman, Polish Jew, 13 attacks).

Rajman's mother Chana was gassed to death at Birkenau. His younger brother Simon was deported to Buchenwald.

== See also ==
- Francs-tireurs et partisans - Main-d'œuvre immigrée
- Affiche rouge
- Brigades Spéciales
- Geheime Feld Polizei
