= Affiche Rouge (disambiguation) =

Affiche Rouge (Red Poster) is a 1944 anti-French Resistance propaganda poster that also refers to the prosecution of the group targeted by the poster.

Affiche Rouge may also refer to:

- Affiche Rouge (1871), an 1871 French poster that called for a revolutionary Commune government, which later came as the Paris Commune
- "L'affiche rouge", a 1961 song by Léo Ferré
- L'Affiche rouge (film), a 1976 French film by Frank Cassenti; winner of the 1976 Prix Jean Vigo
