= Celestino Alfonso =

Spanish republican (1916–1944)

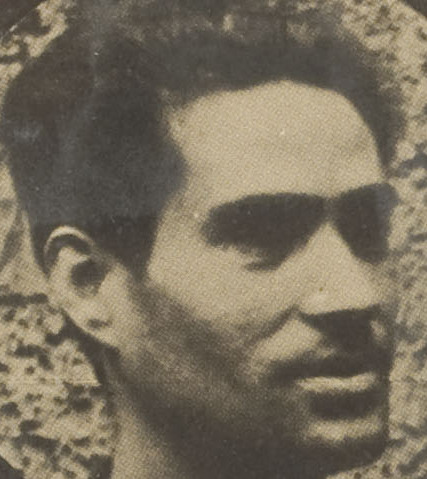

Célestino Alfonso (1 May 1916, at Ituero de Azaba, Salamanca province, Spain – 21 February 1944, at Fort Mont-Valérien, France) was a Spanish republican, a volunteer in the French liberation army FTP-MOI, and a part of the resistance operation led by Missak Manouchian. He was, by profession, a carpenter.

His name will be inscribed in the Panthéon on the entrance to Manouchian's crypt, making him the first Spaniard honored by the Panthéon.

== Youth ==
Alfonso arrived in France at the beginning of the 1930s. In 1934, he joined the Jeunesse communiste (Communist Youth) and became responsible for the Ivry-sur-Seine group. In 1936, he set out as a volunteer for republican Spain, arriving on 27 August 1936. He served as a machine-gunner with the rank of sergeant, and from 1937, the rank of lieutenant. In 1938, his right hand was wounded. He was, shortly afterward, named political commissar of the 2nd International Brigade with the rank of captain. In February 1939, he was repatriated to the camp at Saint-Cyprien, from which he escaped.

== Second World War ==
In May 1942, Alfonso joined the French resistance. Arrested, he was deported to Germany, where, after six months in a camp, he succeeded in escaping and returned to Paris where he became head of a FTP-MOI resistance group. He participated in many operations in Paris and in the Orléans region, notably the execution of General Ernst Von Schaumburg, commandant of Greater Paris, and on 29 September 1943 of SS officer Julius Ritter, responsible for the STO in France.

== Assassination of Ritter ==
The FTP-MOI intelligence service had noticed the strengthening of security measures on rue Saint-Dominique in Paris. A large Mercedes with swastikas on the sides regularly entered the courtyard of the Maison de la Chimie, and a Nazi official was let out. After four months of planning, the military leadership of the FTP requested Marcel Rayman, Léo Kneller and Alfonso to plan an attack against this official. The operation was put under the authority of Missak Manouchian, the military overseer of the FTP-MOI, from late August 1943.

On the morning of 28 September 1943, the Mercedes was parked for a few minutes before picking up its passenger. Alfonso fired at the SS officer as he got into the car. The windshield blocked the bullets, but the man was injured, probably by flying glass. He attempted to get out of the car through the opposite door, but Rayman hit him, fatally, with three bullets. The fighters only learned the man's identity through the German press: it was General Julius Ritter, the assistant in France to Fritz Sauckel, who was responsible for the mobilization and deportation of labor under the German STO (Obligatory Work Service) in Nazi-occupied Europe. Ritter was the chief recruiter of slave labor in occupied France.

The front-page denunciation of this "abominable act" and the official funeral at the église de la Madeleine gave the operation even more impact.

== Arrest and execution ==
Alfonso was arrested in October 1943, and he was shot at the fort Mont-Valérien on 21 February 1944, along with 21 other members of the FTP-MOI. He had a wife and a small child.

== Affiche rouge ==
Alfonso's name was featured on the Affiche rouge poster, as: Alfonso, Espagnol rouge, 7 attentats (Alfonso, Spanish Communist, 7 attacks)

== See also ==
- Main-d'œuvre immigrée
- Francs-tireurs et partisans - Main-d'œuvre immigrée
- Affiche rouge
