= Szlama Grzywacz =

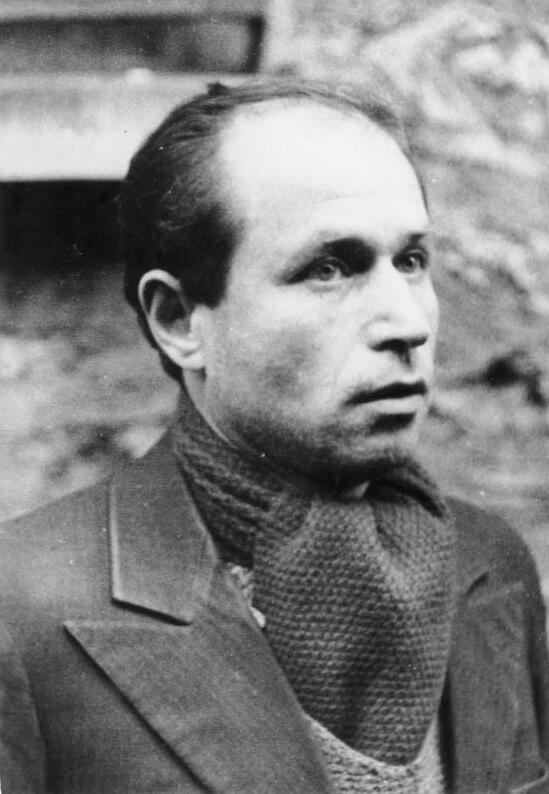
Szlama Grzywacz

Szlama Grzywacz (1909–1944) was one of the members of the French resistance executed at the fort of Mont Valérien as a member of the Manouchian group, a volunteer of the French liberation army FTP-MOI. His name is one of the ten which featured on the Affiche Rouge displayed by the Germans during the trial of the 23 captured members of the Manouchian group. His photograph is displayed with the caption Grzywacz juif polonais 2 attentats (Grzywacz, Polish Jew, 2 attacks).

== Biography ==
=== Early years ===
Szlama Grzywacz was born in Wołomin, Poland in 1909, to a working-class family. He was obliged to work from a young age. At 16 years old, he joined the youth wing of the Communist Party of Poland (KPP), where he became an active militant. In 1931, he was arrested by the regime of Józef Piłsudski and condemned to five years in prison. Invigorated by his incarceration, he resumed his activism on release. His friends advised him to leave Poland to escape persecution by the police.

Grzywacz arrived in Paris in 1936 but soon left for Spain, where he fought in the International Brigades against General Francisco Franco's revolt and the worldwide threat of fascism. After the defeat of the republican army, he spent time in the concentration camps of Gurs and et Argelès-sur-Mer, but managed to get away.

=== Second world war ===
In the German occupation of France during World War II, Grzywacz became active in the underground trade unionism movement. He organized Jewish workers in the fur industry. However, he regarded this work to be too sedate for him, and joined the FTP-MOI where he fought against the Germans. He slipped between the fingers of the Gestapo during their massive arrest operation against foreign fighters.

Grzywacz' experience as a fighter for republican Spain and the Francs-Tireurs prepared him for the suffering he was to endure when he was brought before a German military tribunal, sentenced to death, and executed on the 21 February 1944 at Mont Valérien.

== See also ==
- Francs-tireurs et partisans - Main-d'œuvre immigrée
- Affiche rouge
- Brigades Spéciales
- Geheime Feld Polizei

== Bibliography ==
- FFI - FTPF, Pages de gloire des vingt-trois (Pages of glory of the 23), Immigration, 1951 (French).
