= Wajsbrot =

Wajsbrot is a surname. Notable people with the surname include:

- Alexis Wajsbrot, French film director
- Cécile Wajsbrot (born 1954), French writer
- Wolf Wajsbrot (1925–1944), member of the French Resistance
