= L'affiche rouge =

Song commemorating victims of the Affiche rouge affair

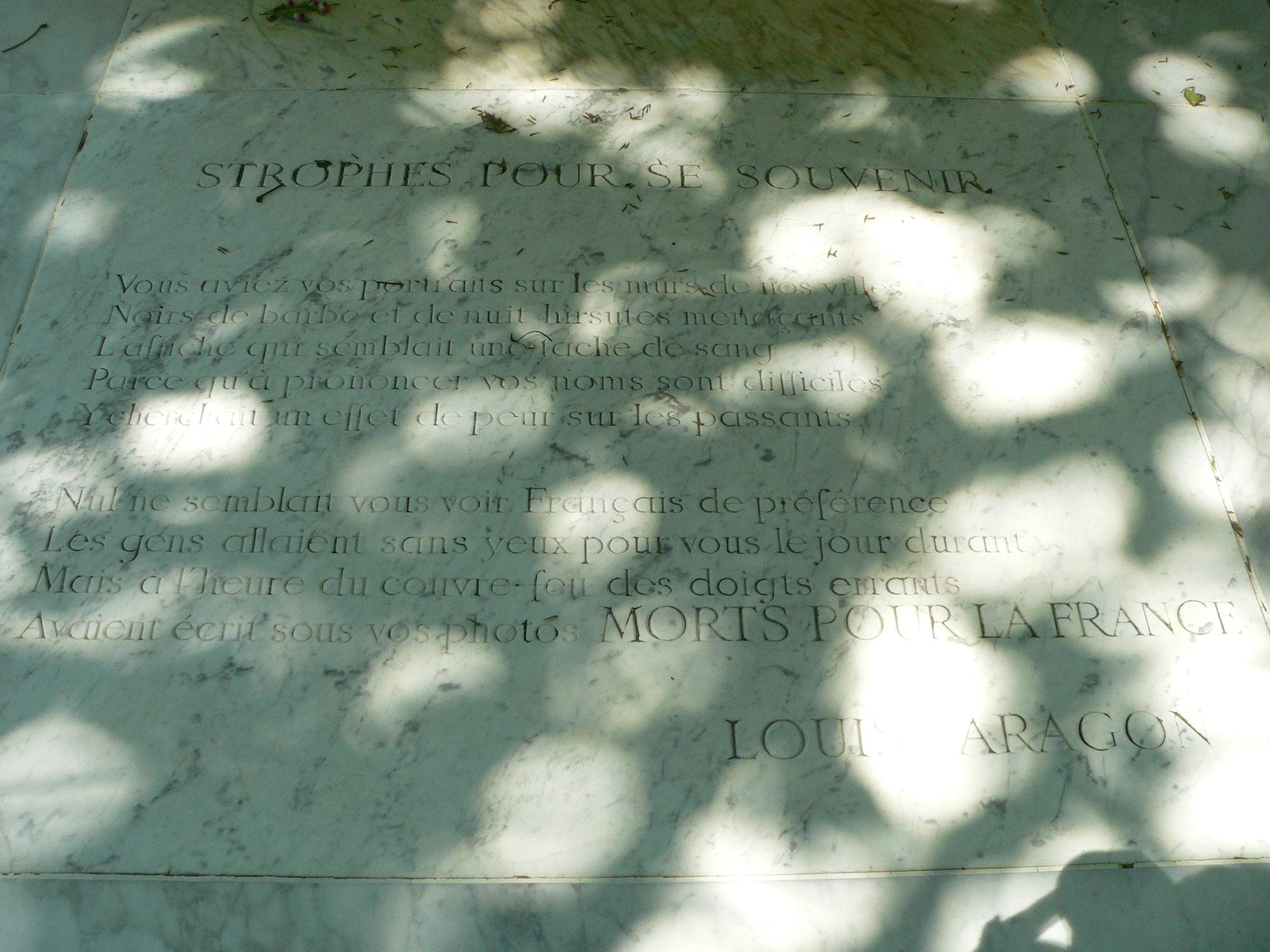
- Strophes pour se souvenir, as inscribed on the monument honoring the FTP-MOI in Père Lachaise Cemetery

Single by Léo Ferré

from the album Les Chansons d'Aragon
- Language: French
- Released: February 1961
- Genre: Chanson
- Length: 4:01
- Label: Barclay

"L'Affiche rouge" is a song from the album Les Chansons d'Aragon (1961) by Léo Ferré. Its lyrics are based on the poem "Strophes pour se souvenir" ("Strophes to remember") which Louis Aragon wrote in 1955 for the inauguration of a street in the 20th arrondissement in Paris, named "rue du Groupe Manouchian" in honor of 23 members of the FTP-MOI executed by the Nazis in the Mont-Valérien. The affair became known by the name of the Affiche rouge ("Red Poster") because the Germans plastered Paris in the spring of 1944 with thousands of red posters denouncing those executed as immigrants and Resistants.

The poem paraphrases Missak Manouchian's last letter to his wife.

== Missak Manouchian, the Affiche Rouge and Manouchian's last letter ==
In mid-November 1943, the Vichy police arrested 23 members of the Communist Party-linked Resistance group, Francs-Tireurs et Partisans de la Main d'Oeuvre Immigrée (FTP-MOI). They were later known as the Manouchian Group after Armenian poet Missak Manouchian, who had commanded them in the three months before their capture. The group was part of a network of about 100 fighters, who committed acts of armed resistance in the Paris metropolitan region between March and November 1943. The group's membership included men of different backgrounds. 22 of them were Poles, five Italians, three Hungarians, two Armenians, three Spaniards, 1 French man and a Romanian woman; eleven members were Jewish.

All but one of the group's members were executed before a firing squad in Fort Mont-Valérien on 21 February 1944; the 23rd was executed later in Germany. As they were killed, many wrote or said "Vive la France".

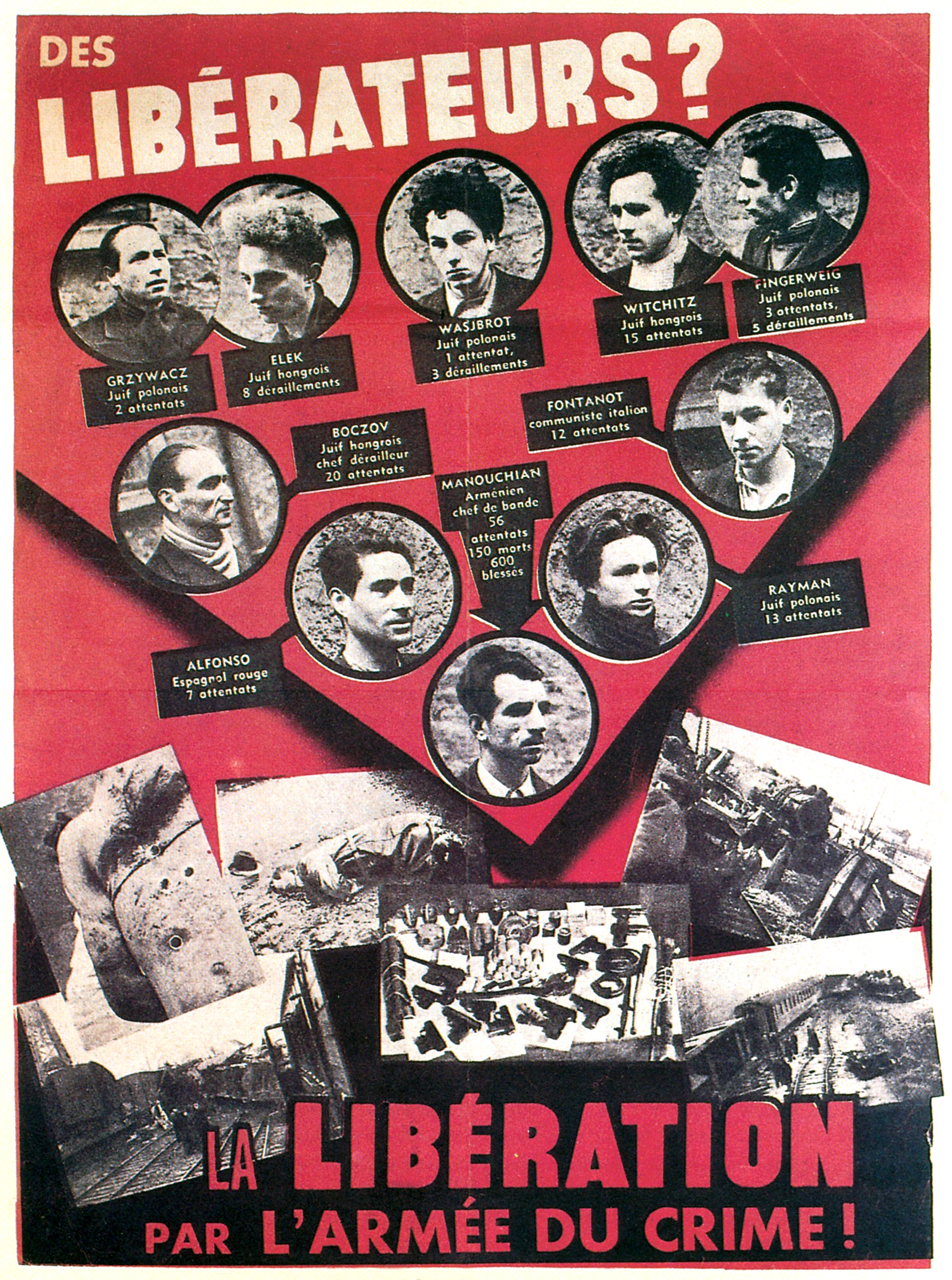
The Affiche Rouge poster

The Affiche Rouge was a notorious propaganda poster, distributed by Vichy France and German authorities in the spring of 1944 in occupied Paris, to discredit the fighters. It featured ten men of the group, with nationality, surnames, photos and descriptions of their crimes. Manouchian is given a prominent place in the poster. The Germans distributed an estimated 15,000 copies of the poster. Along with these posters, the Germans handed out flyers that claimed the Resistance was headed by foreigners, Jews, unemployed people, and criminals; the campaign characterized the Resistance as a "foreigners' conspiracy against French life and the sovereignty of France".

It was related that supporters wrote the graffiti Mort pour la France (lit. They died for France) across the posters and laid flowers beneath some of them.

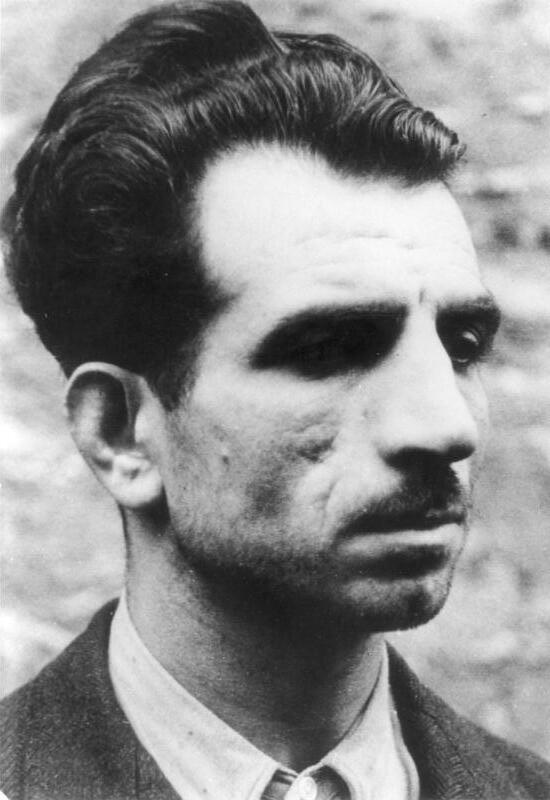
Portrait of Manouchian kept in the German Federal Archives and reproduced on the Affiche Rouge.

Missak's wife was Mélinée Manouchian, also Armenian. After the last arrest of Missak, she was sentenced to death in absentia, but was hidden and saved. After the war, she lived and worked in Yerevan in Armenia, then in the 1960s she returned to Paris. In 1954 she wrote her memoirs about Missak. Missak's last letter to Mélinée is described by translator Mitch Abidor as "perhaps the most famous and beautiful of all final letters." It includes these lines:

My dear Melinée, my beloved little orphan,

In a few hours I will no longer be of this world. We are going to be executed today at 3:00. This is happening to me like an accident in my life; I don't believe it, but I nevertheless know that I will never see you again... At the moment of death, I proclaim that I have no hatred for the German people, or for anyone at all; everyone will receive what he is due, as punishment and as reward. The German people, and all other people will leave in peace and brotherhood after the war, which will not last much longer. Happiness for all... I have one profound regret, and that's of not having made you happy; I would so much have liked to have a child with you, as you always wished. So I'd absolutely like you to marry after the war, and, for my happiness, to have a child and, to fulfill my last wish, marry someone who will make you happy. All my goods and all my affairs, I leave them to you and to my nephews. After the war you can request your right to a war pension as my wife, for I die as a regular soldier in the French army of liberation...

Today is sunny. It's in looking at the sun and the beauties of nature that I loved so much that I will say farewell to life and to all of you, my beloved wife, and my beloved friends. I forgive all those who did me evil, or who wanted to do so, with the exception of he who betrayed us to redeem his skin, and those who sold us out. I ardently kiss you, as well as your sister and all those who know me, near and far; I hold you all against my heart. Farewell. Your friend, your comrade, your husband.

== The poem ==
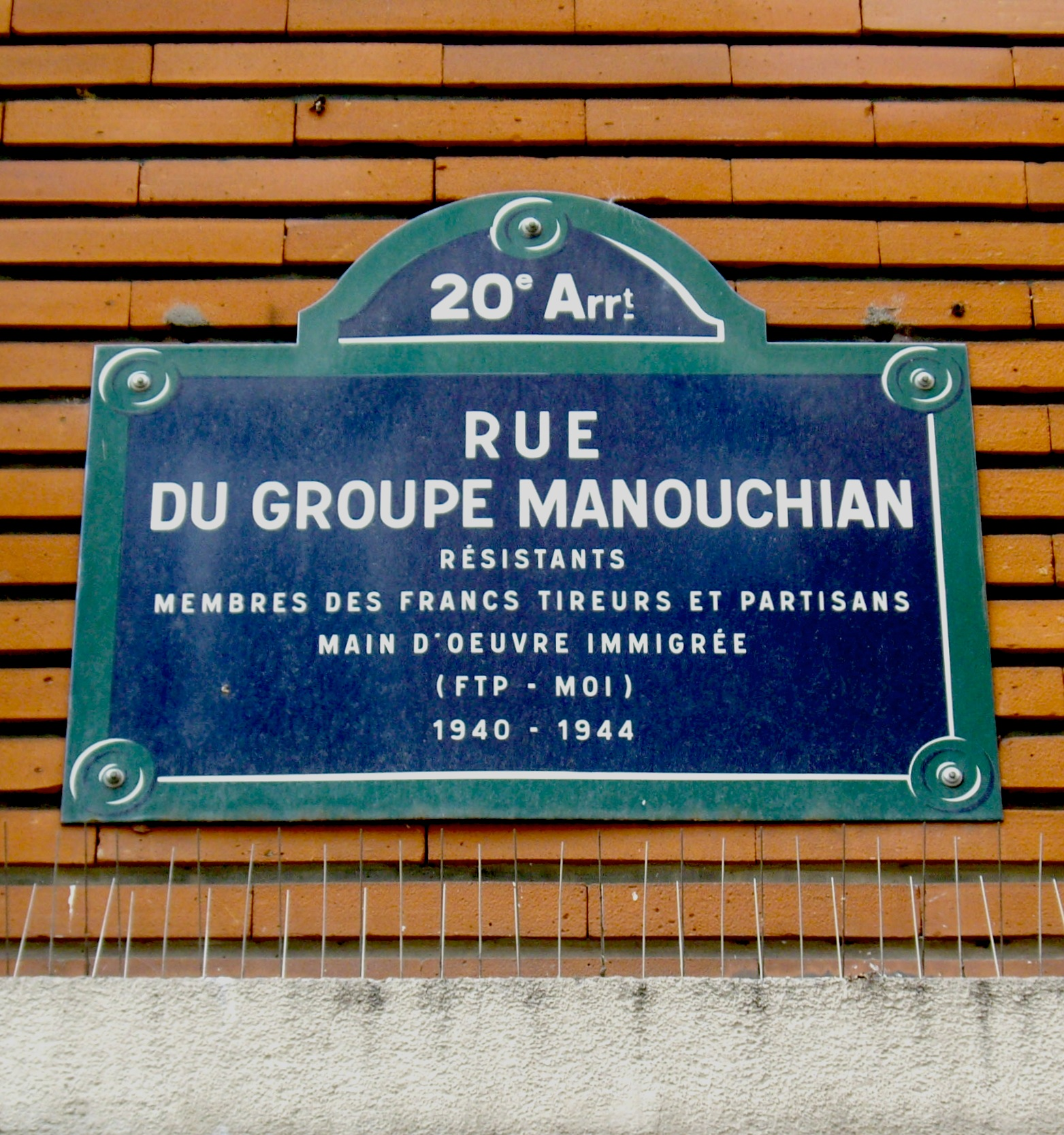
Rue du Groupe-Manouchian in the 20th arrondissement of Paris

Louis Aragon was a French poet, a member of the Communist Party of France, and a Resistance fighter in the Vichy zone during the war. In 1955, Louis wrote a poem memorializing the Manouchian Group. The poem was first published in the Communist newspaper L’Humanité on 5 March 1955, under the title "Groupe Manouchain", and then in Aragon's collection, Le Roman inachevé, as "Strophes pour se souvenir".

Rouben Melik and Paul Éluard also wrote poems in honour of the Manouchian Group.

In 1954, two passages in the 20th arrondissement were merged into a single rue du Groupe-Manouchian, named for the group. Armenians and Communists in France (such as Albert Ouzoulias) had lobbied for this recognition, adopted by Communist councillors in the district; other names had been considered, such as "rue du groupe Manouchian-Boczov" before settling on highlighting Manouchian. Aragon wrote the poem for the street's inauguration on the following year, on 6 March, close to the eleventh anniversary of the execution.

Aragon's poem describes the blood red poster as "seem[ing] like a bloodstain" and describes the way the dark portrayals of the hirsuite foreigners in the poster was designed to evoke fear. The names of the martyrs are described as "difficult to pronounce", conveying their foreignness and perhaps also the Jewishness of some of them. The poem repeats the story that the posters became shrines to the fighters: "People went around looking for you all day long/But at curfew time, wandering fingers/wrote under your photos: Mort pour le France." The poem repeats the number "23", although only 22 were executed at shot at Mont-Valérien (the 23rd, Olga Bancic, would be guillotined in Germany months later).

Aragon's poem includes paraphrasing of Manouchian's last letter. According to Denis Peschanski, the historian who oversaw the request for Manouchian's commemoration in the Panthéon in the 2020s, "It is the poet's homage to the poet. Inevitably, Aragon recognizes himself a little in Manouchian." The letter had asked Mélinée to marry and have children, and to "bring my souvenirs if possible to my parents in Armenia". Missak had wanted her to have children because she had terminated a pregnancy early in the war. Aragon paraphrases these words as: "Marry, be happy and think of me often,/You who will remain among the beauty of things/ When things are over later in Erevan." Here, Aragon echoes Communist policy of the time: after World War II, Stalin promoted a policy of Armenian repatriation to the Armenian Soviet Socialist Republic and its capital Yerevan (Erevan) - and Mélinée did return, but did not remarry or have children. She later returned to France disillusioned with Stalinism.

One theme of the poem is Manouchian's passion for living, as captured in these lines paraphrasing the letter:

Happiness to all happiness to those who will come after us / I die with no hatred in me for the German people. / Farewell to suffering and the pleasure of roses / Farewell to life, to light, and wind / Marry, be happy, and think of me often / You who will dwell in the beauty of the material world / When all is over later in [Yerevan].

Another theme is "the proximity of these martyrs to their fellow citizens", as ordinary people: Aragon calls the 23 "foreigners/strangers, and yet our brothers". Ian Birchall notes that "Aragon wrote that they died “shouting France as they fell”. But the final letters written by these resisters have survived, and scarcely one of them mentions France. They were internationalist revolutionaries fighting against the Nazis."

Aragon's writing of the poem is fictionalised in the 2009 novel, Missak by Didier Daeninckx.

== The song ==
In 1959 Léo Ferré set Aragon's poem to music and recorded it as "L'Affiche rouge". It was the first track on his album Les Chansons d'Aragon, released in 1961.

The first artist to record the song was Monique Morelli, on 30 September 1961, on the TV show Discorama, shortly before Ferré's own version was released. It opened her then newly released record of Aragon poems set to music, Chansons d'Aragon, whose cover depicted her next to the poster.

The success of the song helped make Ferré well-known and it became a staple of his live reportiore.

According to historian Franck Liaigre, the song played a major role in embedding Manouchian and his group in France's collective unconscious. Telerama editor Valérie Lehoux asks "Has any song ever contributed so much to shaping a vision of history?"

It features prominently in Pascal Convert's 2003 documentary about the FTP fighters' deaths and memory, Mont Valérien, aux noms des fusillés.

The song has been covered by many artists, including the Algerian singer Kaddour Hadadi (HK), whose album Les Déserteurs features classic chanson française with Middle Eastern arrangements, Bernard Lavilliers, and Leny Escudero in 1998.

A particularly celebrated cover is by Feu! Chatterton, who have played it at their live concerts since 2021. They played at the ceremony on 21 February 2024 when Missak and Mélinée Manouchian were interred at the Pantheon on the 80th anniversary of his death, and other members of the group were also finally acknowledged by the French state as "Mort pour la France". Singer Arthur Teboul said

It's a song we've been singing for several years and it moves us every night. Because Aragon's words, which themselves echo the words of Missak Manouchian's letter to his partner before he died, are a message, a lesson in humanity: how to be noble of heart in all circumstances? How to remain upright, heroic, but heroic integrity... hese foreigners didn't even have French passports. Manouchian was repeatedly refused French nationality. They fought for an ideal. And then to say Missak Manouchian's goodbyes to his wife Mélinée, in front of their coffins. It's undoubtedly the most pressure-filled moment of our entire short career with Feu! Chatterton."

After the ceremony, a record was released containing their version and Ferré's.
