= Affiche Rouge =

Vichy propaganda poster

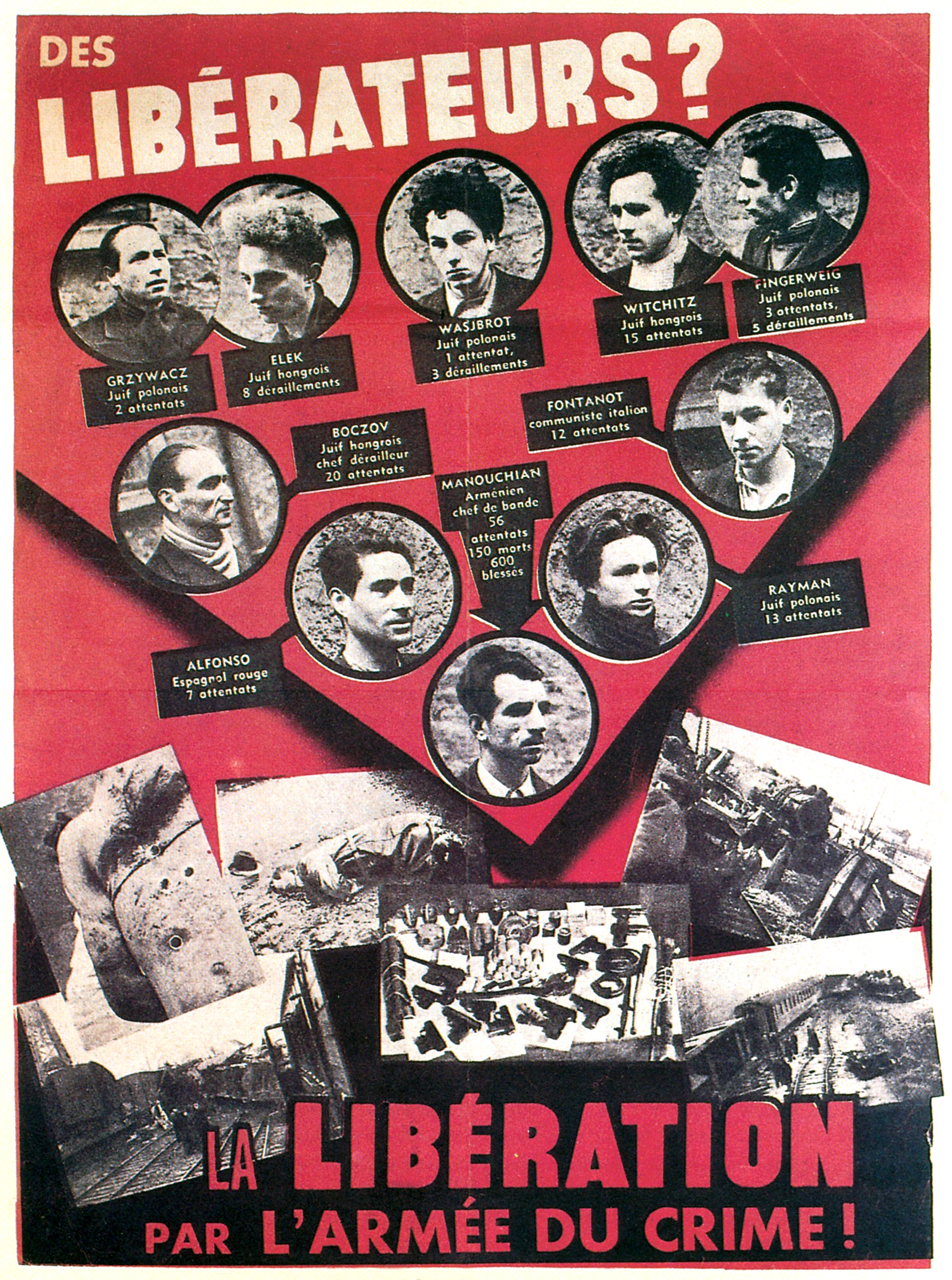
- Language: French
- Media: Poster
- Running time: Spring of 1944
- Slogan: Des libérateurs? La libération par l'armée du crime!
- Country: Vichy France

The Affiche Rouge (French pronunciation: [a.fiʃ ʁuʒ] Red Poster) is a notorious propaganda poster, distributed by Vichy France and German authorities in the spring of 1944 in occupied Paris, to discredit 23 immigrant French Resistance fighters, members of the Manouchian Group. The term Affiche Rouge also refers more broadly to the circumstances surrounding the poster's creation and distribution, the capture, trial and execution of these members of the Manouchian Group.

== Background ==
In mid-November 1943, the French police arrested 23 members of the Communist Francs-Tireurs et Partisans de la Main d'Oeuvre Immigrée (FTP-MOI), who were part of the French Resistance. They were called the Manouchian Group after the commander, Missak Manouchian. The group was part of a network of about 100 fighters, who committed nearly all acts of armed resistance in the Paris metropolitan region between March and November 1943.

Its membership included men of different backgrounds. 22 of them were Poles, five Italians, three Hungarians, two Armenians, three Spaniards, 1 French man and a Romanian woman; eleven members were Jewish.

After having been tortured and interrogated for three months, the 23 were tried by a German military court. To discredit the Resistance, the authorities invited French celebrities (from the world of the cinema and other arts) to attend the trial and encourage the media to give it the widest coverage possible. All but one of the Manouchian Group's members were executed before a firing squad in Fort Mont-Valérien on 21 February 1944. Olga Bancic, who had served the group as a messenger, was taken to Stuttgart, where she was beheaded with an axe on 10 May 1944.

In the spring of 1944, the Vichy authorities launched a propaganda campaign, designed to discredit the Manouchian Group and defuse public anger over their execution. They created a poster, which became known as Affiche Rouge, due to its red background. It featured ten men of the group, with nationality, surnames, photos and descriptions of their crimes; the Germans distributed an estimated 15,000 copies of the poster.

Along with these posters, the Germans handed out flyers that claimed the Resistance was headed by foreigners, Jews, unemployed people, and criminals; the campaign characterized the Resistance as a "foreigners' conspiracy against French life and the sovereignty of France":

Si des Français pillent, volent, sabotent et tuent...

Ce sont toujours des étrangers qui les commandent.
Ce sont toujours des chômeurs et des criminels professionnels qui exécutent.
Ce sont toujours des juifs qui les inspirent.

C’est l’armée du crime contre la France.

Le banditisme n’est pas l’expression du patriotisme blessé, c’est le complot étranger contre la vie des Français et contre la souveraineté de la France.

C'est le complot de l'anti-France!...
C'est le rêve mondial du sadisme juif...

Étranglons-le avant qu'il nous étrangle, nous, nos femmes et nos enfants!

If Frenchmen loot, steal, sabotage and murder...

It is always foreigners who command them.
It is always unemployed and professional criminals who execute.
It is always Jews who inspire them.

It is the army of crime against France.

Banditism is not the expression of wounded patriotism, it is the foreign plot against the lives of the French and against the sovereignty of France.

It is the plot of anti-France!...
It is the world dream of Jewish sadism...

Let's strangle it before it strangles us, our wives and our children!

— Affiche rouge

Although the poster attempted to depict the group as "terrorists", the campaign seems to have had the effect of highlighting the feats of people whom the general public considered to be freedom fighters. Legend has it that supporters wrote the graffiti Mort pour la France (lit. They died for France) across the posters and laid flowers beneath some of them. In 1975, historian Philippe Diaz Raymond claimed that there was no historical record of such activity. However, more recent research has in fact confirmed that such additions by residents did take place.

== Legacy ==
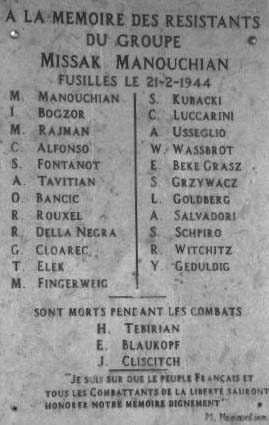
Memorial to the Manouchian Group

In 1955, Louis Aragon wrote a poem memorializing the Manouchian Group, "Strophes pour se souvenir". The poem was published in 1956 in Le roman inachevé. In 1959 Léo Ferré set it to music and recorded it as "L'Affiche rouge". Rouben Melik and Paul Éluard also wrote poems in honour of the Manouchian Group.

In 1997, at the prompting of Robert Badinter, a French senator and former Minister of Justice, the French Parliament authorized a monument to commemorate the execution at Mont-Valérien of 1,006 citizens and members of the French Resistance, including the Manouchian Group, between 1940 and 1944. The sculptor Pascal Convert was commissioned to create the monument and Prime Minister Jean-Pierre Raffarin dedicated it on 20 September 2003.

== Controversy ==
In the 1980s, some French political factions suggested that, because of political infighting, some members of the Resistance had been complicit in the capture of many of the members of the Manouchian Group. A film documentary by Stéphane Courtois and Mosco Boucault, Des terroristes à la retraite, shot in 1983 and broadcast by Antenne 2 in 1985, included interviews of surviving FTP-MOI members and families of the victims. Boucault accused the French Communist Party (PCF) of having deliberately sacrificed the fighters in the power struggle with the Gaullists for control over the National Council of Resistance (CNR). He suggested this was done because the fighters' foreign origins undermined French depictions of the Resistance as a native patriotic movement. In Des terroristes à la retraite, Boris Holban was accused of having betrayed groupe Manouchian, sparking a heated dispute known as L’Affaire Manouchian. The film was rebroadcast in 2001, minus 12 minutes deleted to reflect more recent historical research.

La traque de l'Affiche rouge, a documentary produced by Denis Peschanski and Jorge Amat, broadcast by France 2 on 15 March 2007, refuted Courtois and Boucault's allegations. Quoting the historian Denis Peschanski, who had access to new documents from the Russian, French and German archives, the new documentary alleged that the fall of the Manouchian Group had been due exclusively to the French police. The two newly created branches of the Renseignements généraux (RG) intelligence agency—the Brigades spéciales 1 and 2—had trailed the Résistance fighters for months. On 28 September 1943, Marcel Rayman, with several others, shot and killed the SS General Julius von Ritter. Ritter organized the forced labor of the Service du travail obligatoire (STO). At that time, Rayman had already been under surveillance for two months. The French Milice arrested and dismantled the Manouchian Group after the attack, aided by information given by some members under torture.

In September 2009, the dramatic film L'Armée du crime opened in France, featuring the story of the Manouchian Group. Directed by Robert Guédiguian, a Marseille-based filmmaker of German and Armenian parentage, it was adapted from a story by Serge Le Péron. It reflects some of the divisions among the Résistance. In association with the film's release, reporters interviewed the last surviving member of the FTP-MOI group, Arsène Tchakarian. He decisively refuted the allegation that the PCF had betrayed the Manouchian Group and said that 35 members of the 40 in the group were communists. The film opened in the United States in 2010.

== Content ==
The poster reads:

Des libérateurs? La libération par l'armée du crime!
"Liberators? Liberation by the army of crime!"

From left to right, and top to bottom, individual portraits are labeled:

- GRZYWACZ: Juif polonais, 2 attentats ("Polish Jew, 2 terrorist attacks")
- ELEK: Juif hongrois, 8 déraillements ("Hungarian Jew, 8 derailments")
- WASJBROT: Juif polonais, 1 attentat, 3 déraillements ("Polish Jew, 1 terrorist attack, 3 derailments")
- WITCHITZ: Juif polonais, 15 attentats ("Polish Jew, 15 terrorist attacks" — although Witchitz was born in France, being unclear if he was in fact Jewish or of Polish ancestry)
- FINGERCWAJG: Juif polonais, 3 attentats, 5 déraillements ("Polish Jew, 3 terrorist attacks, 5 derailments")
- BOCZOV: Juif hongrois, chef dérailleur, 20 attentats ("Hungarian Jew, chief of derailment operations, 20 terrorist attacks")
- FONTANOT: Communiste italien, 12 attentats ("Italian Communist, 12 terrorist attacks". He is known also as "Fontano")
- ALFONSO: Espagnol rouge, 7 attentats ("Red Spaniard, 7 terrorist attacks")
- RAYMAN: Juif polonais, 13 attentats ("Polish Jew, 13 terrorist attacks")
- MANOUCHIAN: Arménien, chef de bande, 56 attentats, 150 morts, 600 blessés ("Armenian, boss of the gang, 56 terrorist attacks, 150 dead, 600 wounded")

The bottom features photographs of:

- the right shoulder and right chest of a corpse, riddled by bullet holes
- a dead body lying on the ground
- a derailed locomotive
- a derailed train
- a collection of small arms, grenades, and bomb components, displayed on a table
- another derailed train

== See also ==
- Vichy France

== Bibliography ==
- Benoît Raisky, L’Affiche rouge 21 février 1944, Ils n’étaient que des enfants., Éditions du Félin, 2004 (review by L'Humanité)
- Bowd, Gavin (December 2014). "Romanians of the French Resistance". French History. 28 (4): 541–559. doi:10.1093/fh/cru080. hdl:10023/9636.

== Films ==
Fiction

- Franck Cassenti, L'Affiche Rouge (1976)
- Robert Guédiguian, L'Armée Du Crime (2009)

Documentary

- Stéphane Courtois and Mosco Boucault, Des terroristes à la retraite (1983)
- Pascal Convert (in French), Mont-Valérien, aux noms des fusillés
- Denis Peschanski (in French) – Jorge Amat (in French), La traque de l’Affiche rouge (2007)
