= Kégham Atmadjian =

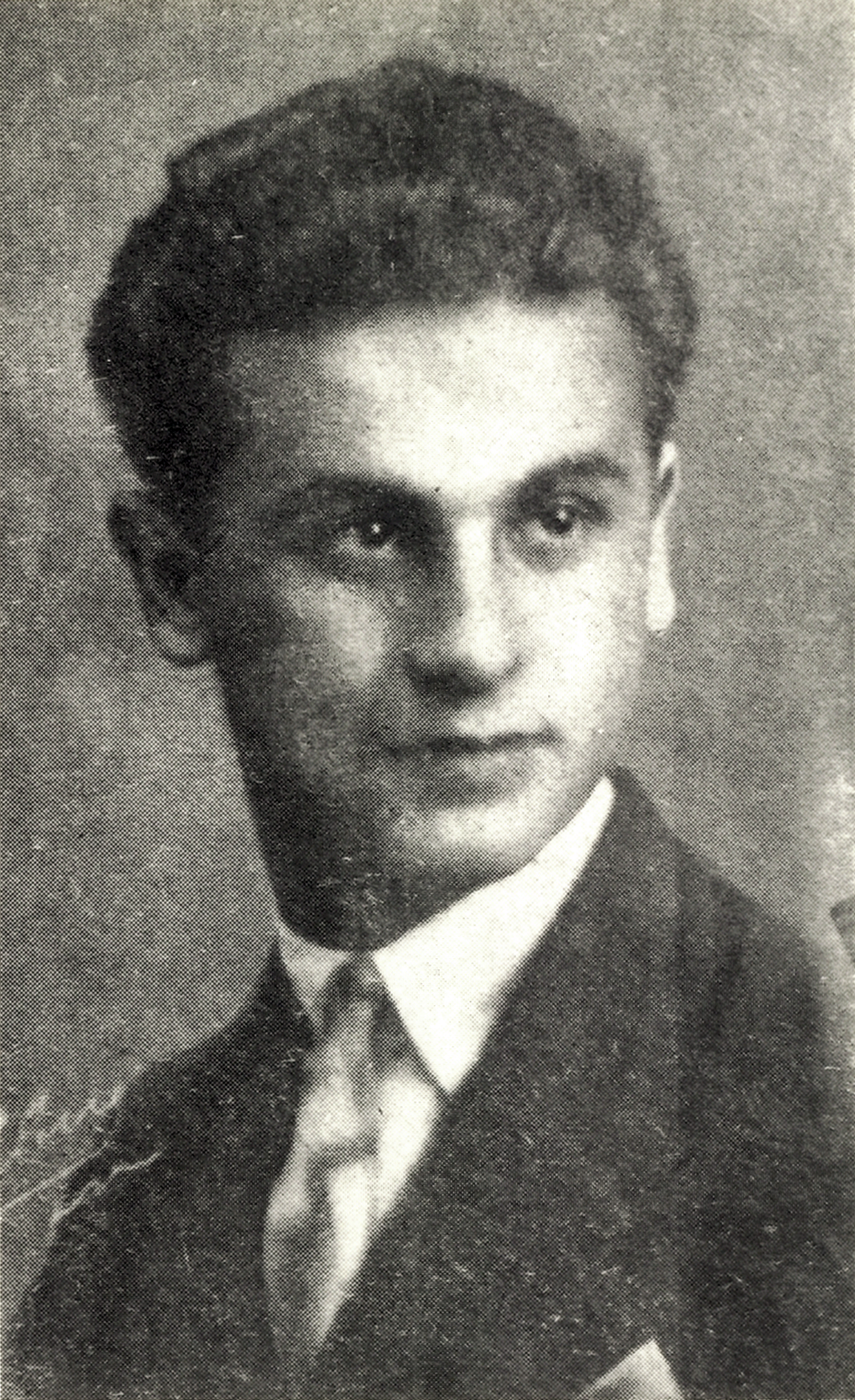
- Born: Kegham Mihrani Atmadjian; November 18, 1910; Bafra, Ottoman Empire
- Died: May 18, 1940 (aged 29); France
- Cause of death: Killed in action
- Other name: Sema
- Occupations: poet and editor
- Partner: Emma Jeanne Charlotte Le Chevalier

Kégham Atmadjian (Armenian: Գեղամ Աթմաճեան, literary pseudonym Sema, November 18, 1910 – May 18, 1940) was a French-Armenian poet and editor.

== Biography ==
Being a survivor of the Armenian genocide, Atmadjian lived in orphanages in Turkey and Aleppo. In 1929 he moved to Paris, where he published the Armenian cultural magazine "Jank" (Effort), together with Missak Manouchian. In 1935–1937 he published another Armenian magazine, "Mshaguyt" (Culture), with Bedros Zaroyan. He was the author of poems, plays, short stories, and articles. In 1940 he was killed during his service in the French army at the outbreak of World War II. His sister Marie Atmadjian, a poet by herself, wrote memoirs about him.
