= Yiddisher Arbeter Sport Klub =

Sports club in Antwerp, Belgium

Yiddisher Arbeter Sport Klub (Yiddish for 'Jewish Workers Sports Club', abbreviated YASK; Dutch: Joodse Arbeiders Sportklub, abbreviated JASK) was a Jewish sports organization in Antwerp, Belgium. It was founded in 1936. YASK was linked to the Communist Party of Belgium. A product of the Popular Front era, YASK was set up as an open sports organization for the Jewish population at large. The club emphasized anti-fascism, whilst maintaining a neutral stand on Zionism.

YASK sent a troupe to the 1937 People's Olympiad in Barcelona. YASK members were active in the United Jewish Aid Committee for Spain in Antwerp.

YASK served as a pool for recruitment for resistance cells during the Second World War.
