= Wolf Wajsbrot =

French resistance member

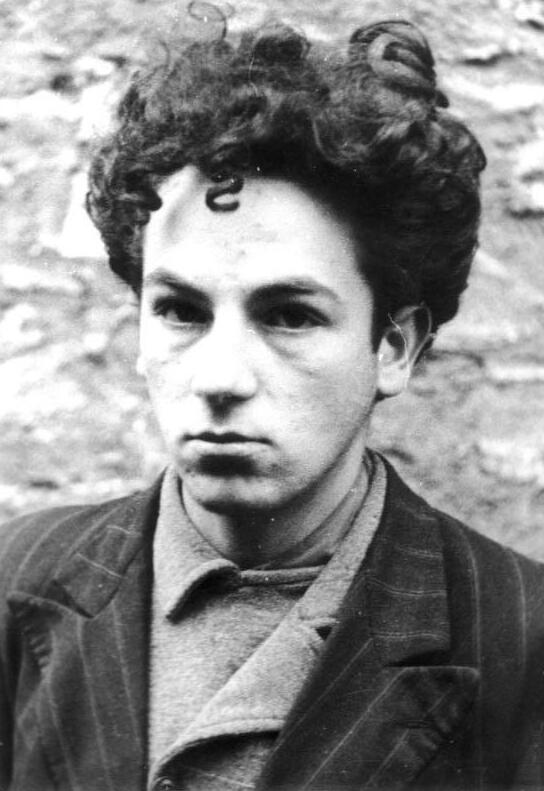
- Wajsbrot in a pose similar to that on the Affiche Rouge
- Born: 3 March 1925; Kraśnik, Lublin Voivodeship, Second Polish Republic
- Died: 21 February 1944 (aged 18); Fort Mont-Valérien, Paris, Military Administration in France
- Cause of death: Execution by firing squad
- Burial place: Ivry Cemetery
- Military career
- Allegiance: PCF
- Branch: FTP
- Unit: FTP-MOI

Wolf Wajsbrot (3 March 1925 – 21 February 1944) was a member of the French Resistance under the Nazi occupation. He was born in the Polish town of Kraśnik. His parents moved to France shortly after his birth due to increasing antisemitism and a worsening economic climate, eventually settling in Paris.

In 1939, the year Germany invaded Poland and war was declared, Wajsbrot gained his school leaving certificate and began training to be a mechanic. Following the Nazi occupation of Paris, Wajsbrot's parents were arrested in the Vel' d'Hiv Roundup (Rafle du Vel' d'Hiv) on 16 July 1942 and deported. Wajsbrot joined the Communist resistance group Francs-tireurs et partisans - Main-d'œuvre immigrée (FTP-MOI) shortly afterwards and proved to be a key participant in the violent actions they brought against the occupiers. Six days after his eighteenth birthday, Wajsbrot threw a grenade into a train carriage reserved for German soldiers, causing "undescribable damage" according to an eye-witness.

By mid-1943, the Germans had begun to close in on the FTP-MOI. Following the capture of one of the group's leaders and the subsequent information gained from his torture, the remaining the members of his cell (Wajsbrot among them) were captured in November 1943. Between his capture and subsequent trial in February of the following year, Wajsbrot was interrogated and tortured. After a one-day trial, he was condemned to death. On the afternoon of 21 February 1944, still just eighteen years old, Wajsbrot was executed at Mont Valérien, in a suburb of Paris.

Wajsbrot's photograph was one of ten featuring on the Affiche Rouge, the iconic Nazi propaganda poster describing the FTP as an "army of crime".

He is buried in the Parisian cemetery of Ivry under the words Mort pour la France.

== Bibliography ==
- (in French) Les Jeunes et la Résistance, dir. Laurence Thibault, AERI/La Documentation Française, 2007
- (in French) L'Affiche rouge, Adam Rayski Mairie de Paris, 2003
- (in French) La Résistance en Ile-de-France, DVD-Rom, AERI, 2004
- (in French) Le Sang de l'étranger - Les immigrés de la M.O.I. dans la Résistance, S. Courtois, D. Peschanski, A. Rayski, Fayard, 1989
