= Affiche Rouge (1871) =

1871 revolutionary poster and precursor to the Paris Commune

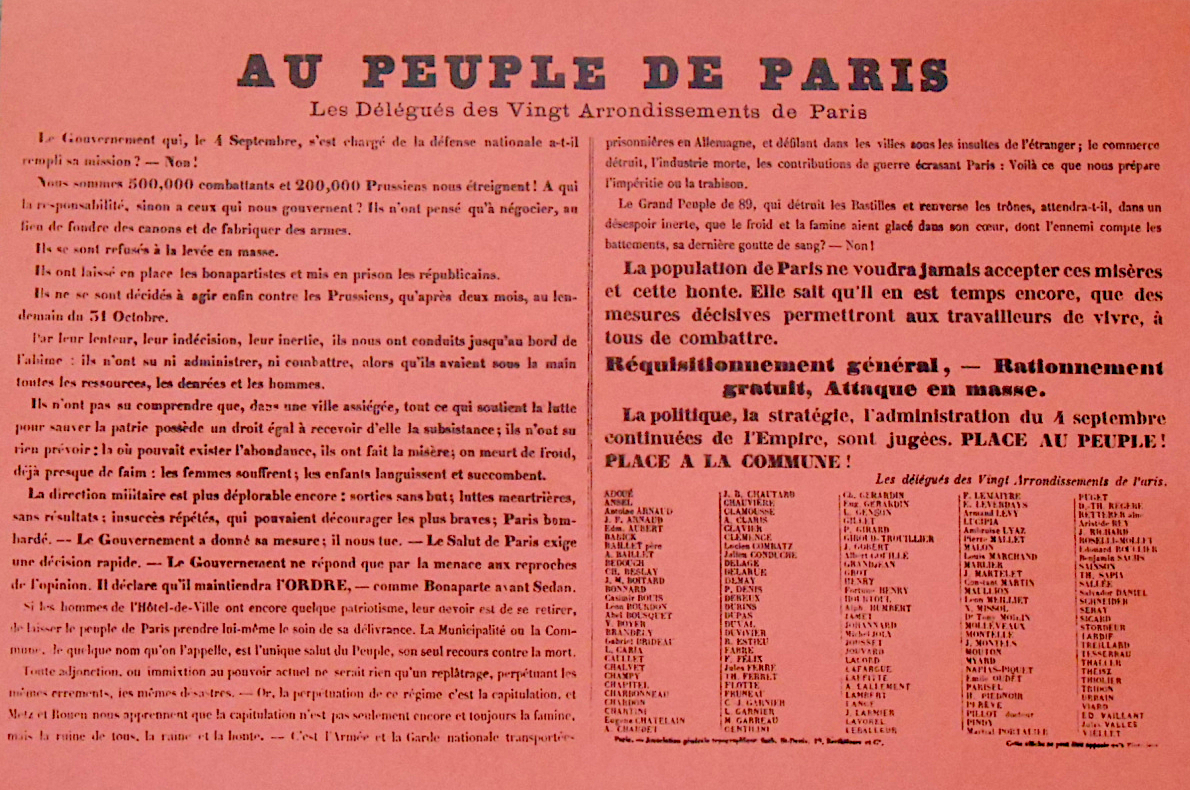

The 1871 Affiche Rouge (Red Poster) was a poster hung in January 1871 to popularize the idea of a revolutionary government, or Commune, in Paris, as would later arrive in March with the Paris Commune. Written by Gustave Tridon and Jules Vallès but credited to a group that called itself the Delegation of the Twenty Arrondissements, the poster lambasted governmental indecisiveness and military ineffectiveness, such as lack of fight despite Frenchmen outnumbering the attacking Prussians. The poster was signed by 140 leftist activists. There were no demonstrations alongside the poster, but the government charged its authors with insurrection.
