= Rouben Melik =

French-Armenian poet (1929–2007)

- Ռուբեն Մելիք
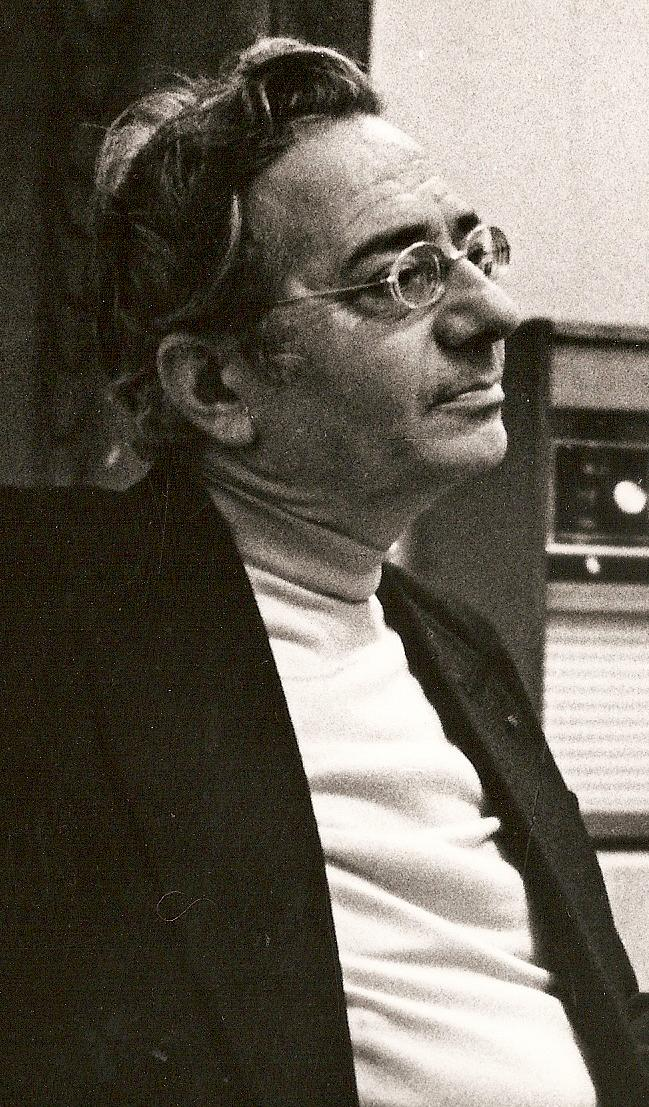
- Born: 14 November 1921; Paris, France
- Died: 21 May 2007 (aged 85)
- Other name: Writer

Rouben Melik (Armenian: Ռուբեն Մելիք; 14 November 1921 – 21 May 2007) was a French-Armenian poet and a member of the French Resistance. Officer of Ordre des Arts et Lettres (1963).

Rouben Melik studied in Sorbonne with Gaston Bachelard, before his entrance to the literature under the aegis of the Resistance. One year after the publication in 1941 of Variations of triptyches, he joined the French Communist Party where he became a friend of Paul Eluard, alongside the Manouchian group and took part in the liberation of Paris. After the war, he founded "Armenian Youth of France" organization.

Winner of Apollinaire prize in 1948.
