= Pascal Convert =

French visual artist

- In a 2026 interview
- Born: 1957 (age 68–69); Mont-de-Marsan, France
- Occupation: Artist
- Known for: Monument to those shot at Mont Valérien 1941–1944

Pascal Convert (born 1957) is a French visual artist. He has made sculpture, installations and videos, and has published several books. He is perhaps best known for his monument to the hostages and Resistance fighters who were shot at Mont Valérien during World War II (1939–1945).

== Career ==
Pascal Convert was born in 1957 in Mont-de-Marsan. He originally studied literature rather than art. He lives and works in Biarritz. He began to exhibit in 1984. Convert has made sculpture, installation art, video and documentaries. From 1989 to 1990 he was resident in the Villa Medici in Rome. For many years Convert taught at a technical college in Bayonne. He is the subject of a book La Demeure, la souche: L’Apparentement de l’artiste (1998) by Georges Didi-Huberman.

In 2002 Convert received a commission from the French state to create a monument to the hostages and French Resistance fighters shot at Mont Valérien between 1941 and 1944. The Mémorial de la France combattante is an important site for commemorating the French Resistance during World War II (1939–1945), with a ceremony attended by the president of France held on 18 June each year. However, there was no monument to those shot at Mont Valerien, since many were foreign, Communist or Jewish. After some delay, the controversial monument was inaugurated by prime minister Jean-Pierre Raffarin in September 2003.

Convert made a documentary film, Mont Valérien, aux noms des fusillés (2003). The film tells the story of the Mont Valérien monument and the résistants whom it honors. Convert contrasts the Mont Valérien of the Gaullist ceremonies, exalting the FFI resistance, and the place where the firing squads executed their victims. The film portrays the résistants in humanistic terms, as individuals who may be emulated but are not utterly different from other people. In 2007 Convert published a historical biography of Joseph Epstein ("Colonel Gilles"), a leader of the Francs-Tireurs et Partisans (FTP) in the Île-de-France who was shot at Mont Valérien in 1944. During his research he made a fourth crystal sculpture named Le temps scellé and a documentary film Joseph Epstein, bon pour la légende.

Convert made a sculpture commissioned by the Fonds national d'art contemporain (Paris) and the Musée d'art moderne Grand-Duc Jean (Luxembourg), inspired by La Pietà du Kosovo (George Mérillon), La Madone de Benthala (Hocine Zaourar) and La mort de Mohamed Al Dura à Gaza. This work has been exhibited in France, Montreal and the United Nations. In 2008 he received a public commission to make a set of stained glass windows for the Abbey church of Saint-Gildas-des-Bois. In 2010 he published a book about Raymond Aubrac’s life and a documentary on that subject for France Télévisions. The film deals with Aubrac's role in decolonization, a sensitive issue on which the Resistance members could not agree.

== Work ==
Convert's work focuses on the question of memory and forgetting. He uses a wide range of techniques, from traditional molding, prints, Japanese lacquer and metalwork to computer modelling, image synthesis and digital animation. Physical materials include glass, wax and porcelain. His projects include Trois Villas (1986–1996), a series of drawings of three abandoned villas on the coast near Biarritz and Appartement de l'artiste (1987–1990), which explores the interior of his former apartment in Bordeaux. Souches (1995–1998) incorporates painted sections of tree trunks from the battlefields of Verdun and Hiroshima. A wax bas-relief Pietà de Kosovo (1999–2000) was commissioned for the 2000 Biennale de Lyon.

His work has been shown in France at the Centre d'arts plastiques contemporains (CAPC) in Bordeaux (1992), Galerie nationale du Jeu de Paume (1995), Centre Georges Pompidou (L’empreinte, 1997), Frac des Pays de la Loire, Nantes (La demeure, la souche, 1999). It has been shown at museums in several other countries including the Wakayama Museum of Modern Art (Japan), Iwaki Museum of Modern Art (Japan), Kunstverein (Bonn, Germany), Kouskovo Museum (Moscow) and the Museum of Modern Art (Delhi, India). His work has been exhibited at other galleries and public buildings in France and elsewhere in Europe including Madrid, Karlsruhe, Hamburg and Berlin.

== Publications ==
- Convert, Pascal (1989). Convert. Galerie Jean-Francois Dumont.
- Convert, Pascal (1997). Pascal Convert: Villa Arson, 21 juin-6 octobre 1997. Centre national des arts plastiques, Ministère de la culture.
- Convert, Pascal (2007). Joseph Epstein: bon pour la légende : Zamosc 16 octobre 1911, Mont Valérien 11 avril 1944 : lettre au fils. Séguier. ISBN 978-2-84049-527-7.
- Convert, Pascal; Dagen, Philippe (2007). Lamento: Pascal Convert 1998-2005. Musée d'Art Moderne Grand-Duc Jean (Mudam Luxembourg). ISBN 9782919923502.
- Convert, Pascal (2007). Généalogie des lieux (1985-1996): Volume 1, Villa Belle Rose, Biarritz. Atlantica. ISBN 978-2-7588-0062-0.
- Convert, Pascal (30 March 2011). Raymond Aubrac: Résister, reconstruire, transmettre. Seuil. ISBN 978-2-02-104918-3.
- Convert, Pascal (2 October 2013). La Constellation du Lion: Collection littéraire dirigée par Martine Saada. Grasset. ISBN 978-2-246-80862-6.

== Sources ==
- Bracher, Nathan (Spring–Summer 2007). "Remembering the French Resistance: Ethics and Poetics of the Epic". History and Memory. 19 (1). Indiana University Press: 39–67. doi:10.2979/HIS.2007.19.1.39. JSTOR 10.2979/HIS.2007.19.1.39. S2CID 159836182.
- Hela (19 July 2012). "Pascal Convert". Réseau savoir.fr.
- P.P. (21 September 2012). "Aubrac ou l'exercice de la puissance humaniste". Sud Ouest.
- "Pascal Convert". Babelio.
- "Pascal Convert". Artists and Associates.
- "Pascal Convert". Galerie Eric Dupont.
- Saint, Nigel (1 January 2007). "Pascal Convert and the Family: History, Conflict and Creativity". Affaires de Famille: The Family in Contemporary French Culture and Theory. Rodopi. ISBN 978-90-420-2170-9.
