= Main-d'œuvre immigrée =

Trade union of France

The Main-d'œuvre immigrée was a French trade unionist organisation, composed of immigrant workers of the Confédération générale du travail unitaire (CGTU) in the 1920s. The MOI was affiliated to the Profintern.

== History ==
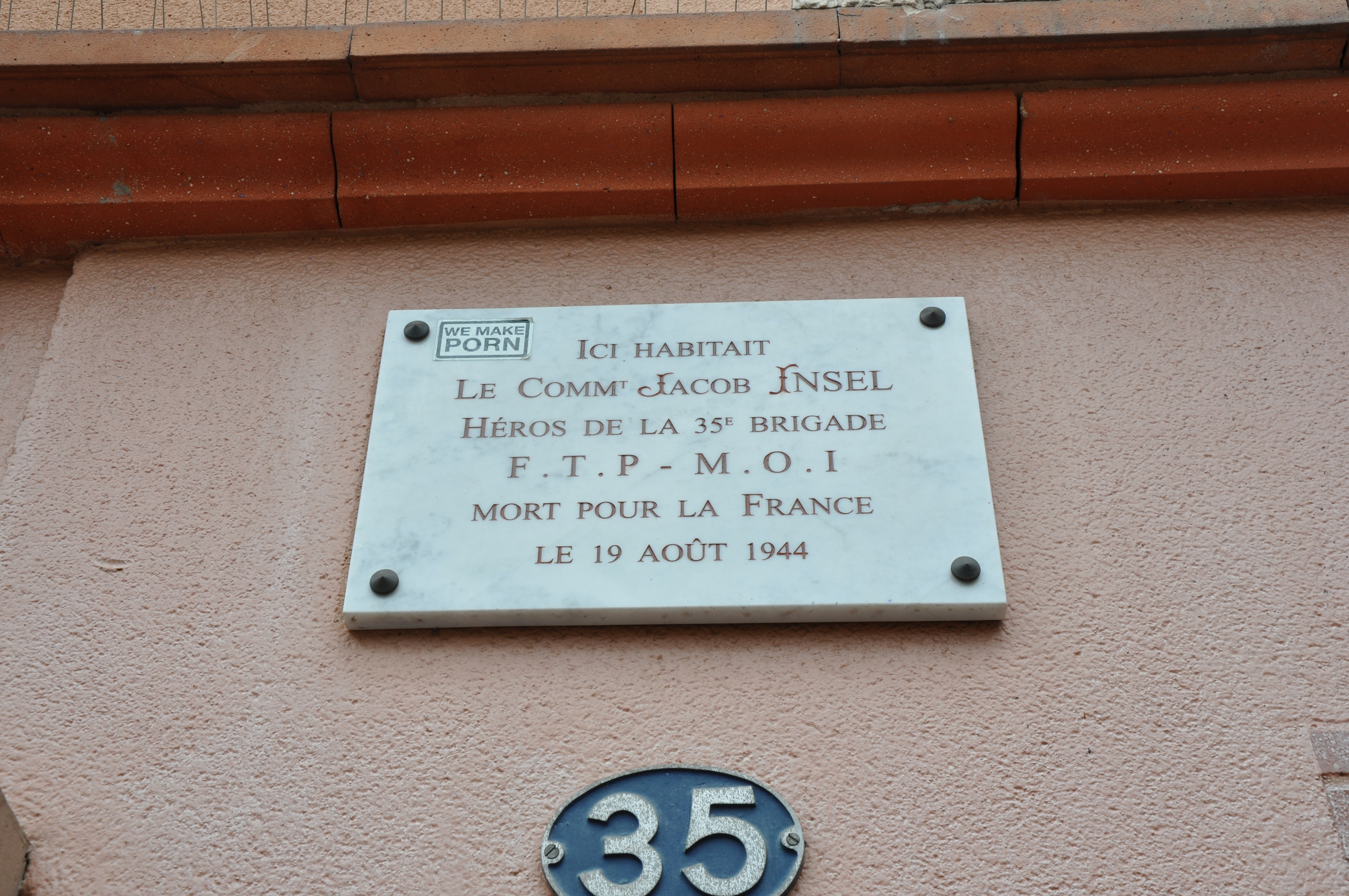

The MOI was initially named Main d'œuvre étrangère, but the French Communist Party, who in practice were in charge, changed the name from étrangère (foreign) to immigrée (immigrant) due to perceived xenophobia during the 1930s.

=== FTP-MOI ===
See also FTP-MOI.

During the Second World War, Louis Grojnowski (called "Brunot") and Simon Cukier aka Alfred Grant took charge, and the organisation gave rise to an armed squad, the FTP-MOI, directed by Joseph Epstein.

After the mass arrest of more than 13,000 Jews in the Vel' d'Hiv Roundup in July 1942, the groups became somewhat more active. Pursued relentlessly by the Special Brigades of the Intelligence Service, almost all the MOI fighters had been identified by the end of summer 1943. In the autumn, the French police arrested them all, and nothing remained of the FTP-MOI.

The most famous of the FTP-MOI's members was Missak Manouchian, and the FTP-MOI is widely known from the affiche rouge, a red German propaganda poster displaying the members of the FTP-MOI after their arrest at the end of 1943, whose aim was to stigmatise the presence of foreigners and Jews among the French Resistance; a poem by Louis Aragon, set to music and sung by Léo Ferré, deals with this story.

== Sister organisation ==
In Belgium too there was a Main-d'œuvre immigrée organization, which took part in the Belgian Resistance in the ranks of the Front de l'Indépendance under the leadership of the Bulgarian Todor Angelov and the Italian-Belgian Jacques Grippa, while others were also active in Solidarité juive or in the Comité de Défense des Juifs, led by Hertz Jospa and Have Groisman.

== See also ==
- Union générale des israélites de France
- Gildea, R. (2024). Obituary of Madeleine Riffaud. The Guardian. London. Accessed 28 Jun. 2025.
