= Missak Manouchian =

French-Armenian Resistance fighter (1909–1944)

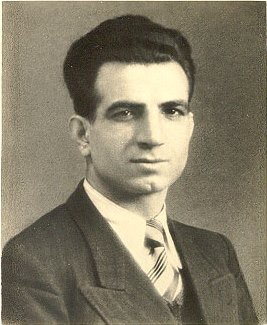
- Manouchian in the 1930s
- Born: 1 September 1909 (registered 1906); Adıyaman, Ottoman Empire
- Died: 21 February 1944 (aged 34); Fort Mont-Valérien, Suresnes, Occupied France
- Cause of death: Execution by firing squad
- Resting place: Ivry Cemetery, Ivry-sur-Seine (until 21 February 2024) Panthéon, Paris (since 21 February 2024)
- Other name: Michel Manouchian (francized)
- Occupations: Trade unionist, poet, translator, political activist
- Organization: FTP-MOI
- Political party: French Communist Party (from 1934)
- Movement: Labour movement, Anti-fascism, French Resistance
- Spouse: Mélinée (née Assadourian)

Signature
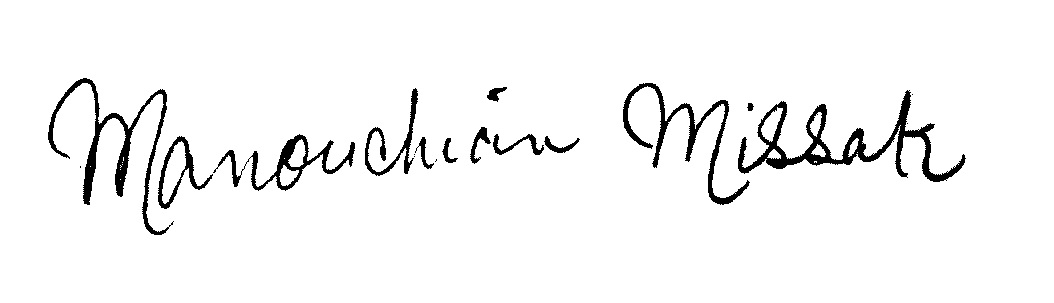

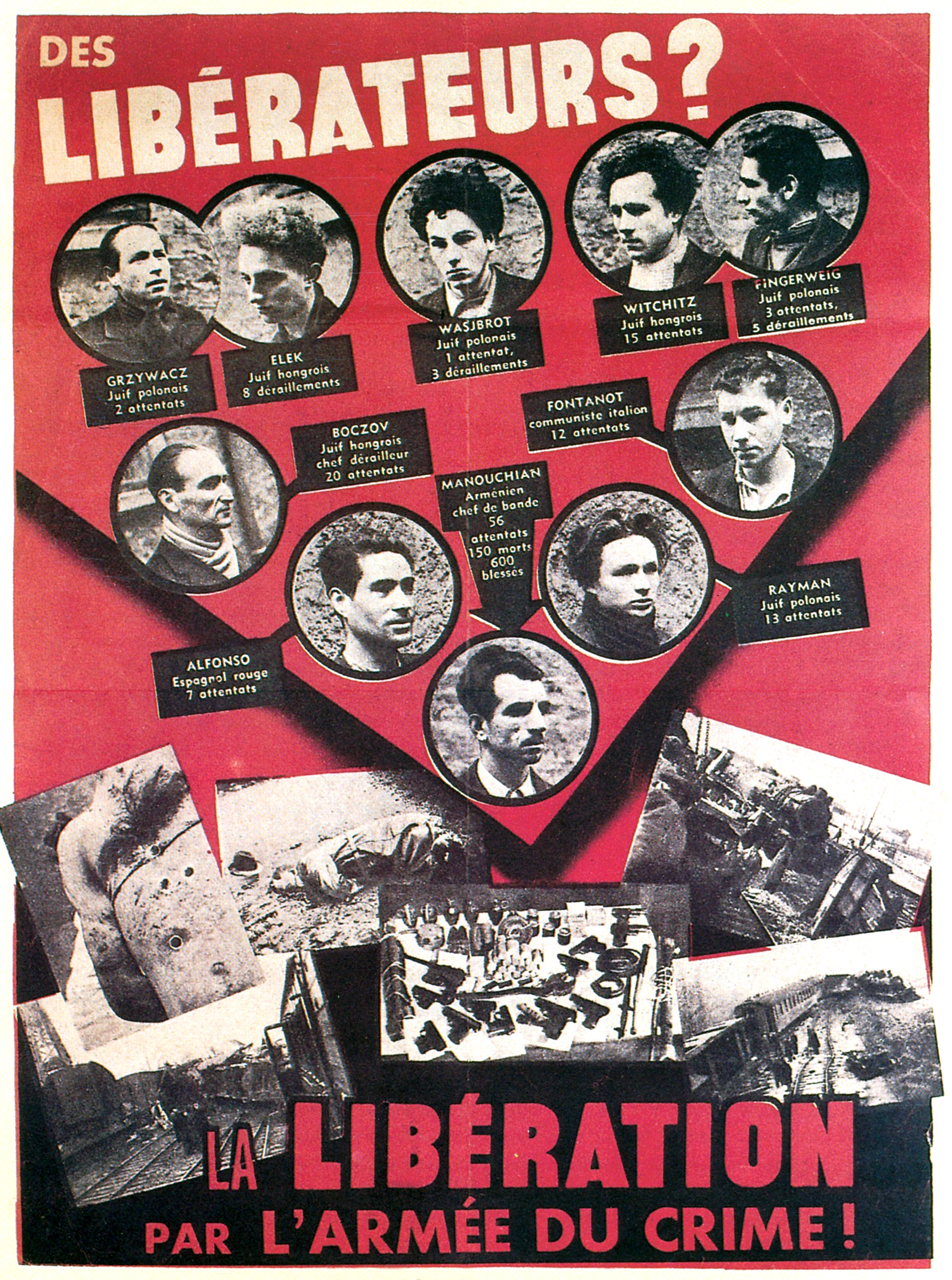
The "Affiche Rouge" showing the group members and their "crimes", published by the Nazi and French police.

Missak Manouchian (Armenian: Միսաք Մանուշեան; pronounced [misɑkʰ manuʃjɑn], 1 September 1909 – 21 February 1944) was an Armenian poet and communist activist. A survivor of the 1915–1916 Armenian genocide, he moved to France from an orphanage in Lebanon in 1925. He was active in communist Armenian literary circles. During World War II, he became the military commissioner of FTP-MOI, a group consisting of European immigrants, including many Jews, in the Paris Region which carried out assassinations and bombings of Nazi targets. According to one author, the Manouchian group was the most active one of the French Resistance. Manouchian and many of his comrades were arrested in November 1943 and executed by the Nazis at Fort Mont-Valérien on 21 February 1944. He is considered a hero of the French Resistance and was entombed in the Panthéon in Paris.

== Early life ==
Manouchian is registered as being born on 1 September 1906 in Adıyaman, in Mamuret-ul-Aziz Vilayet, Ottoman Empire into an Armenian peasant family. It was discovered in February 2024 that he was in fact born in 1909, when pages from his notebooks, discovered in May 2023 by his family at the Charents Museum of Literature and Arts, were obtained at the last minute for the exhibition celebrating his transfer to the Panthéon, and exhibited although not yet exploited by French researchers, as they were written in Armenian: his great-grandniece Hasmik Manouchian read in an entry dated February 1935 that he was 25. She said that this corroborated family stories that he had made himself older by three years, as he was not 18 when he arrived in France, but 15, too young to be allowed to work. The historian Denis Peschanski, who curated the exhibition, pointed out that this was relatively common for immigrants to France at the time. His tomb at the Panthéon, installed a short time before, is engraved with the date 1906.

His parents were killed during the Armenian genocide of 1915, but he and his brother managed to survive. In the early 1920s he settled in an Armenian General Benevolent Union-run orphanage in Jounieh, Lebanon, then a French protectorate. He acquired education there and in 1925 moved to France.

Eventually, Manouchian settled in Paris, where he took a job as a lathe operator at a Citroën plant. During this period he was self-educated and often visited libraries in the Latin Quarter. He joined the General Confederation of Labour (Confédération Générale du Travail, CGT), a national association of trade unions which was the first of the five major French confederations. In the early 1930s, when the world-wide economic crisis of the Great Depression set in, Missak Manouchian lost his job. Disaffected with capitalism, he began earning a meager living by posing as a model for sculptors.

== Political and literary career ==
In 1934, Manouchian joined the French Communist Party. From 1935 to 1937 he edited the Armenian-language left-wing weekly newspaper Zangou, named after a river in Armenia. The newspaper was anti-fascist, anti-Dashnak, anti-imperialist and pro-Soviet.

Manouchian wrote poetry and, with an Armenian friend who used the pseudonym of Séma (Kégham Atmadjian), founded two communist-leaning literary magazines, Tchank ("Effort") and Mechagouyt ("Culture"). They published articles on French literature and Armenian culture. The two young men translated the poetry of Baudelaire, Verlaine, and Rimbaud into Armenian, making many of these works available in Armenian for the first time. Both Manouchian and Séma enrolled at the Sorbonne to follow courses in literature, philosophy, economics, and history.

The following year, he was elected secretary of the Relief Committee for Armenia (HOC), an organization associated with the MOI (Immigrant Workforce Movement). At a meeting of the HOC in 1935, he met Mélinée Assadourian, who became his companion and, later, his wife.

== World War II ==
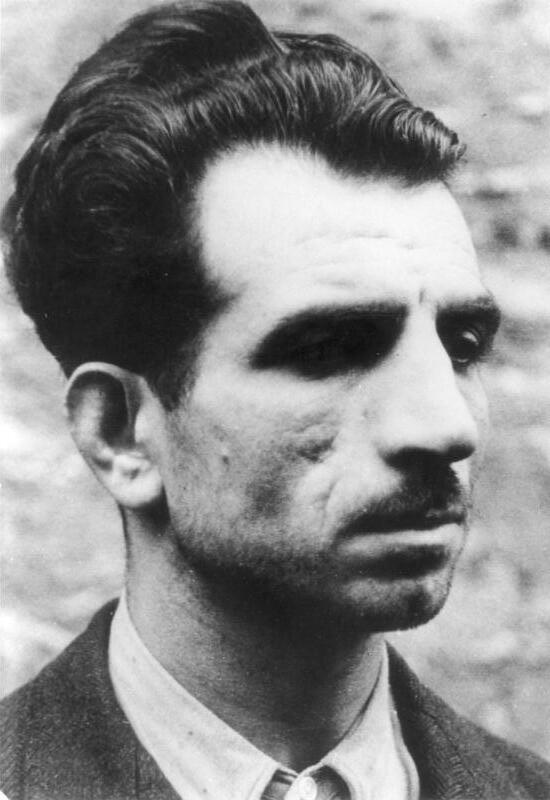
Portrait kept in the German Federal Archives and reproduced on the Affiche Rouge.

When the Second World War broke out in September 1939 Manouchian was arrested for his suspect communist ties, but was released in October and conscripted into the French 4th Specialist Training Company and dispatched to Brittany. After the defeat of June 1940, he returned to Paris to find that his militant activities had become illegal. (French authorities had banned the Communist Party as early as September 1939.) On 22 June 1941, when the invasion of the Soviet Union by the Nazis began, Manouchian was arrested by the occupying Germans in an anti-communist round-up in Paris. Interned in a prison camp at Compiègne, he was released after a few weeks without being charged, thanks to the efforts of his wife, Mélinée Assadourian.

In early 1943 he was recruited by Boris Milev. Manouchian became the political chief of the Armenian section of the underground MOI, but little is known about his activities until 1943. In February of that year, Manouchian transferred to the FTP-MOI, a group of gunmen and saboteurs attached to the MOI in Paris.

Manouchian became the leader of the FTP-MOI in June/August 1943, replacing Boris Holban. Manouchian assumed command of three detachments, totaling about 50 fighters. The Manouchian group is credited with the assassination on 28 September 1943, of General Julius Ritter, the assistant in France to Fritz Sauckel, responsible for the mobilization and deportation of labor under the German STO (Obligatory Work Service) in Nazi-occupied Europe. (The attack was made by the partisans Marcel Rayman, Léo Kneller, and Celestino Alfonso.) The Manouchian group carried out almost thirty successful attacks on German interests from August to November 1943. Charles Aznavour and his family were members of the Manouchian resistance group, and were recognized after the war for rescuing Jews and Armenians from Nazi persecution.

=== Arrest and execution ===
On 16 November 1943, the collaborationist French police forces arrested the Manouchian group at Évry-Petit Bourg. His companion, Mélinée, managed to escape the police.

Manouchian and the others were tortured to gain information, and eventually handed over to the Germans' Geheime Feldpolizei (GFP). The 23 were given a show trial for propaganda purposes before execution. Manouchian and 21 of his comrades were shot at Fort Mont-Valérien near Paris on 21 February 1944. The remaining group member, Olga Bancic, was deported to Stuttgart and beheaded there in May 1944.

In his last letter to his wife, Mélinée, Manouchian said that he forgave everyone except the one who betrayed us to save his skin and those who sold us. "There was consensus that they were betrayed by one of their number, Joseph Davidovitch, who was arrested and tortured by the Nazis (before being released and shot by the Resistance). But some survivors also felt the French Communist Party had sacrificed the unit by refusing to smuggle vital Jewish combatants out of Paris after the French police began to tail them."

Photographs of French Resistance agents facing a firing squad of Nazi officers were discovered in December 2009, and Serge Klarsfeld identified them as Manouchian and his group members. The photographs began being permanently exhibited at Fort Mont-Valérien in June 2010.

== L'Affaire Manouchian ==
In June 1985, a television documentary by Mosco Boucault with the historian Stéphane Courtois working as a consultant entitled Des terroristes à la retraite (Terrorists in Retirement) was aired. The documentary started an intense dispute over the identity of the informer who betrayed Manouchian and the rest of groupe Manouchian in 1943. In the documentary, Mélinée Manouchian accused Boris Holban of being the informer.

In the 1986 book L'Affaire Manouchian by Philippe Robrieux, Holban was accused of being a member of an "ultra-secret special apparatus" within the PCF that took its orders from the Kremlin and that Holban had betrayed the groupe Manouchian on orders from Moscow. The French journalist Alexandre Adler, in a series of articles in the Socialist newspaper Le Matin, defended Holban, arguing that he was not in Paris in the fall of 1943 and thus was not in a position to know the address of Manouchian or anyone else in his group. Adler drew attention to a 1980 article in the Romanian journal Magazin istoric by the FTP-MOI intelligence chief Cristina Luca Boico, where she mentions that Holban was leading a maquis band in the Ardennes in November 1943 and had not been in Paris for some time.

L'Affaire Manouchian was finally settled in the 1990s when French police records were opened, revealing that Joseph Davidowicz, a resistance fighter who was arrested and then released by the Gestapo, was the informer who betrayed Manouchian. Davidowicz was later killed by fellow resistance members, who accused him of spying for the Germans.

== Recognition ==
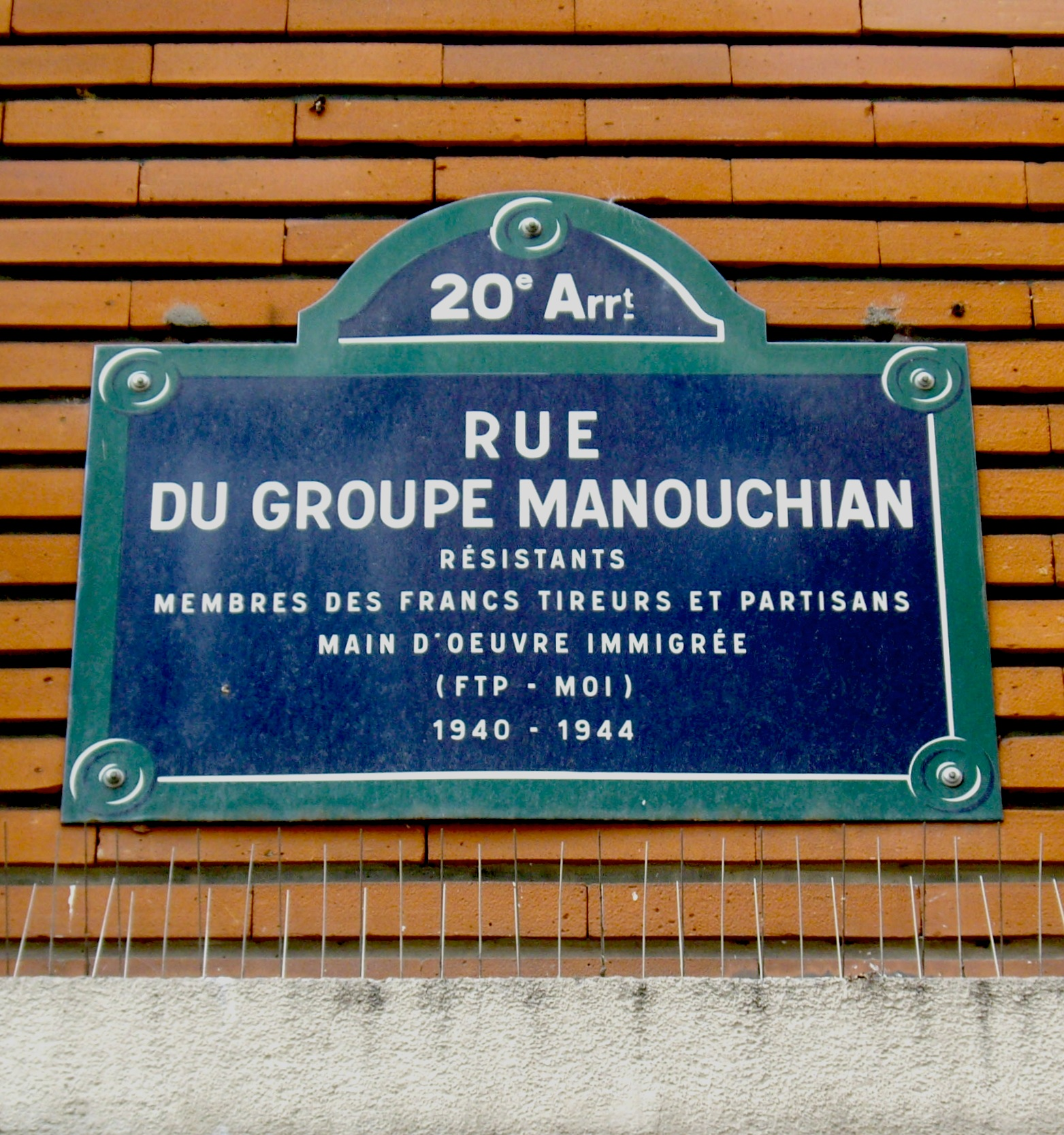
Rue du Groupe-Manouchian in the 20th arrondissement of Paris

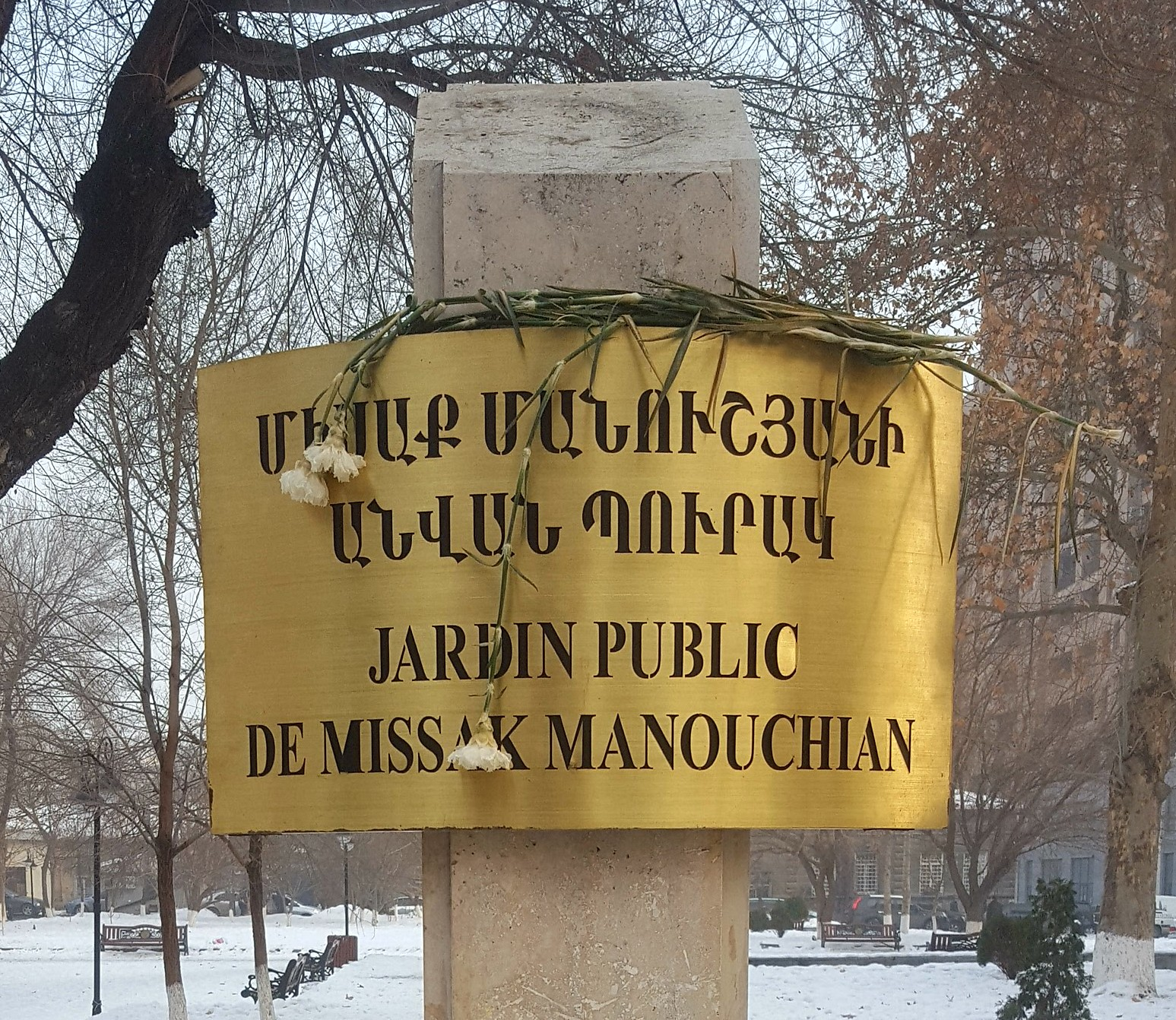
Missak Manouchian Park in central Yerevan

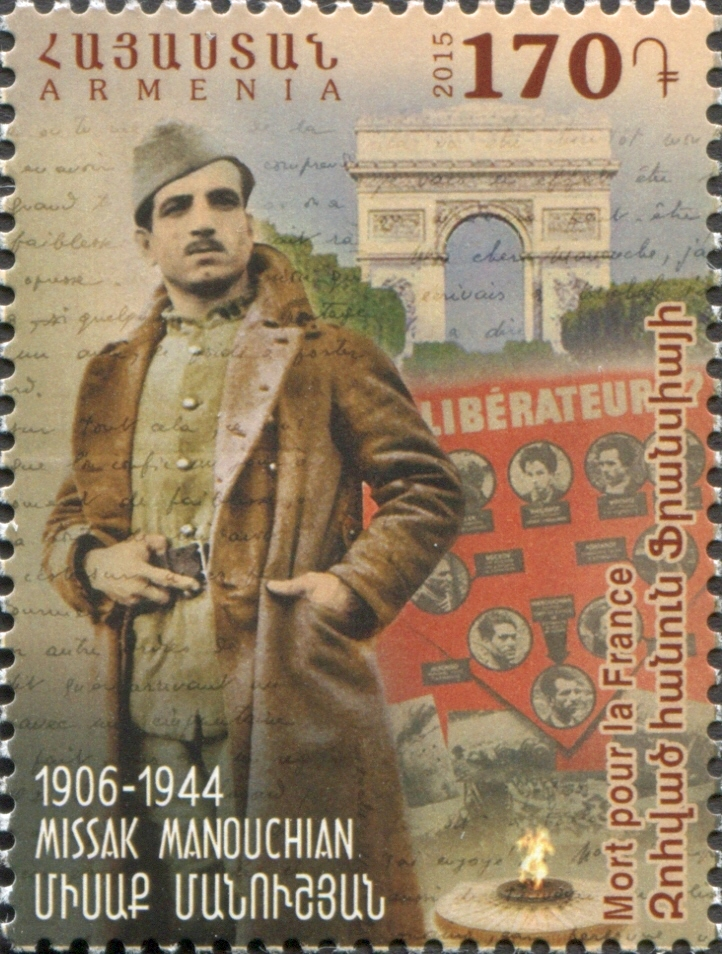
Manouchian on a 2015 Armenian stamp

Following World War II, Armenians were perceived in France positively "solely in the reflective light of Missak Manouchian, who played an important role in the French anti-Nazi resistance." Manouchian is a prominent figure in the bilateral relations between Armenia and France.

Due to his Communist ideology, Manouchian was immediately recognized as a hero in the Soviet Union. Soviet Armenian author Marietta Shaginyan described him as an "example of an Armenian who preserved his nationality, and at the same time became a class-conscious worker and a militant communist in his adopted country." Russian poet Sergei Shervinsky hailed him in a 1956 Ogoniok article as a "Fighter, Worker, Poet". A school in Yerevan, Armenia—founded in 1947—was named for Manouchian in 1963.

On 5 March 1955, a street named for the Manouchian Group (fr) was dedicated in the 20th arrondissement of Paris.

In 1978, a statue of Manouchian sculpted by Ara Harutyunyan was opened in the military cemetery of Ivry-sur-Seine, Paris.

In 2007, an exhibition dedicated to Manouchian was held at the Musée Jean Moulin in Paris in the scope of the Year of Armenia in France. A commemorative plaque was installed on 22 February 2009 at 11 rue de Plaisance, in the 14th arrondissement of Paris. The old hotel at this address was the last home shared by Manouchian and his wife, Mélinée.

In February 2010, busts of Manouchian were inaugurated in Marseille, in a square named after him, and in Issy-les-Moulineaux.

On 21 February 2014, on the 70th anniversary of the execution of Manouchian and his group, a commemoration ceremony was held at Fort Mont-Valérien. Notable attendees included French President François Hollande, Armenian foreign minister Eduard Nalbandyan and prominent French-Armenian singer Charles Aznavour. On 13 March 2014, the Missak Manouchian Park was opened in central Yerevan, the Armenian capital, in attendance of Presidents Serzh Sargsyan and Hollande.

In June 2014, the memorial in Marseille was defaced with a swastika. Two far-right activists, who admitted their participation, were sentenced to 100 hours of community service in January 2015.

=== Pantheonization ===
In January 2022 a campaign was launched by Nicolas Daragon, mayor of Valence, Drôme, and Jean-Pierre Sakoun, president of Comité Laïcité République, and others to move Manouchian's ashes to the Panthéon. Supporters included Katia Guiragossian, a great-niece of Missak and Mélinée Manouchian, sociologist Nathalie Heinich, historian Denis Peschanski, and others. It further gained the support of the mayors of Paris and Marseille Anne Hidalgo and Benoît Payan, former French ambassador to Armenia Jonathan Lacôte, and MPs from various parties. In March 2022 Europe 1 reported that French President Emmanuel Macron was planning pantheonization of Manouchian. A close presidential adviser was quoted as saying: "This file is at the top of the pile." Le Monde reported Macron met with supporters of the campaign on March 30, 2022 at the Élysée Palace and several days later, Macron said of Manouchian: "I think he is a very great figure and that makes a lot of sense."

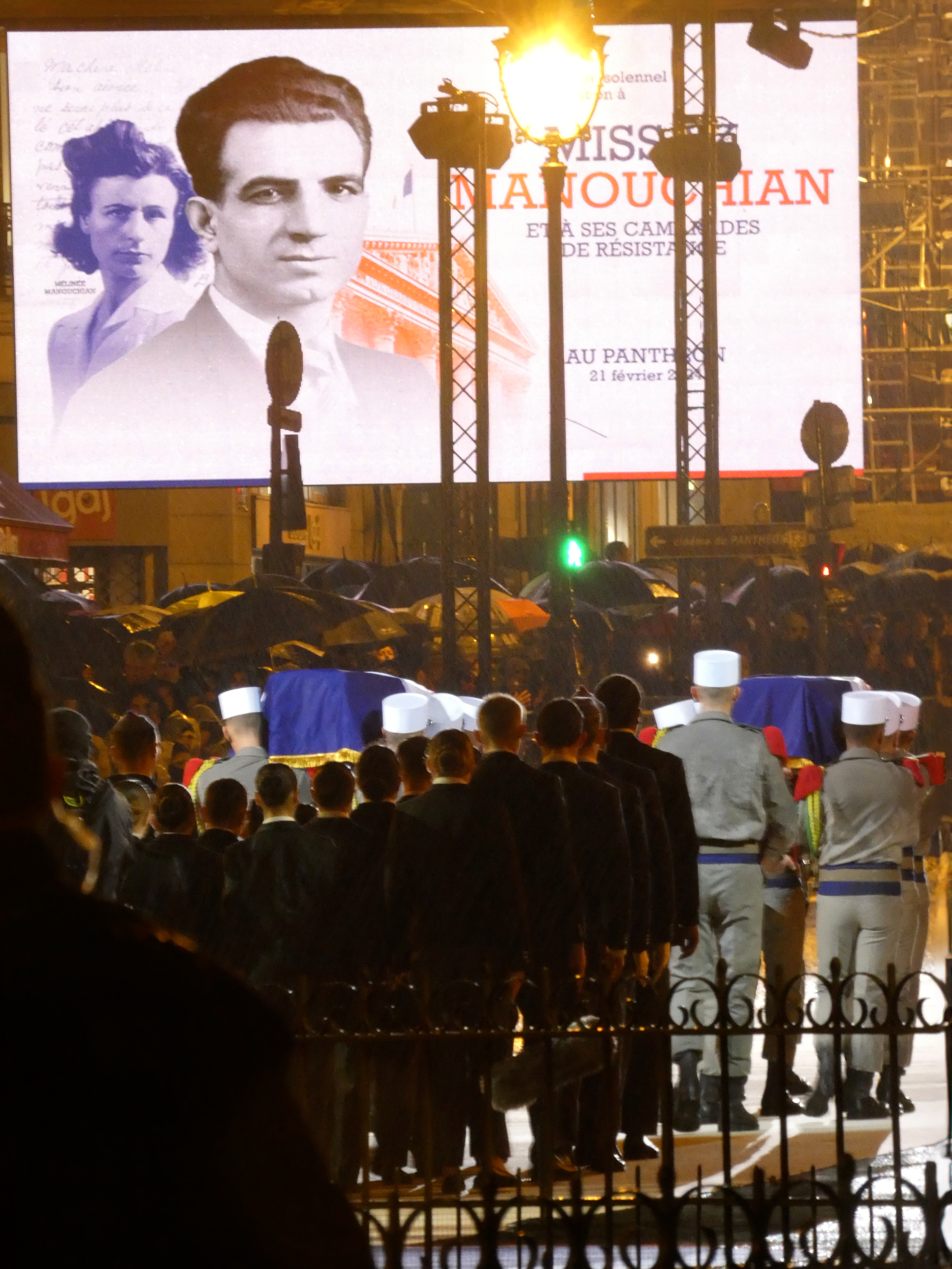
Transfer ceremony to the Panthéon of Missak and Mélinée Manouchian.

Missak Manouchian and his wife Mélinée were entombed in the Panthéon on 21 February 2024, in commemoration of his execution's 80th anniversary. He became the first communist to enter the Panthéon.

== In popular culture ==
- In 1955, Louis Aragon wrote a poem, "Strophes pour se souvenir", loosely inspired by the last letter that Manouchian wrote to his wife Mélinée. In 1959 Léo Ferré set the poem to music and recorded it under the title "L'Affiche rouge".
- In the 2009 novel Missak by Didier Daeninckx, set in 1955, a journalist investigates who betrayed Manouchian and discovers the informer was Boris Bruhman, a thinly disguised version of Boris Holban.
- In 2025, Indian author Dr. Prashant Madanmohan wrote The God of Deserted Memories, a novel exploring themes of memory, genocide, and resistance, featuring reflections on Missak Manouchian as a symbol of transcultural anti-fascist struggle.

Films

- The 1985 film Terrorists in Retirement (Des terroristes à la retraite) offers speculations on why "beginning in 1943, the [French] Communist Party began deliberately dispatching the partisans [including the Manouchian group] on missions that their Communist leaders knew would lead to their arrest and probable execution."
- The 2009 film The Army of Crime (L'Armée du crime), directed by Robert Guédiguian, is dedicated to Manouchian and his group. In the film, Manouchian appears as the hero, and many parallels are drawn between the Armenian genocide and the Holocaust as the film emphasizes Manouchian's opposition to genocide in the Second World War because he was a survivor of genocide in the First World War. In a review of L'Armée du crime in Le Monde on 15 November 2009, the French historian Stéphane Courtois complained that the film wrongly portrayed Manouchian as an "anti-Stalinist" communist and the film was unrealistic in that it had Manouchian casually and routinely violating the rules of clandestine activity. The British historian Gawin Bowd described the film as part of a tendency to move away from the traditional gallocentric view of résistancialiste where resistance in France was entirely the work of the French. However, Bowd noted that the way in which L'Armée du crime portrays Manouchian as a martyr who mort pour la France (died for France) does suggest that Manouchian was more of a French hero than an Armenian one as the "ultimate horizon of Frenchness remains".
- Missak Manouchian, une esquisse de portrait (2012) is a documentary directed by Michel Ionascu.

== See also ==
- Affiche Rouge (Red Poster)

== Bibliography ==
- Bowd, Gavin (December 2014). "Romanians of the French Resistance". French History. 28 (4): 541–559. doi:10.1093/fh/cru080. hdl:10023/9636.
- Khaleyan, Ervand (1946). "Նյութեր Միսակ Մանուշյանի մասին [Materials on Missak Manouchian]". Bulletin of the Academy of Sciences of the Armenian SSR: Social Sciences (in Armenian) (4): 71–86. Archived from the original on 21 February 2015.

Further reading

- Manouchian, Mélinée (1954). Manouchian (in French). Paris: Les Éditeurs français réunis.
- Poghossian, Varouzhan (1985). "Միսաք Մանուշյանի նամակները [Misak Manushian's letters]". Lraber Hasarakakan Gitutyunneri (in Armenian) (7): 90–92.
- Daeninckx, Didier (2009). Missak: l'enfant de l'Affiche rouge (in French). Perrin. ISBN 978-2262028022.
- Benson, Darcy Colleen (2014). "Communist, Foreigner, Résistant?: Post-War Commemoration of Missak Manouchian and Marcel Langer" (Honors Thesis). Student Honors Theses by Year. Dickinson College.
- Robrieux, Philippe [in French] (1986). L'Affaire Manouchian (in French). Paris: Fayard. ISBN 2213017875.
