= Geheime Feldpolizei =

Secret Field Police
- Geheime Feldpolizei
- Active: 1939–1945
- Disbanded: 8 May 1945
- Country: Germany
- Allegiance: Nazi Germany
- Branch: German Army (later under the operational control of the RSHA, though still nominally part of the Wehrmacht)
- Type: Military police, secret police
- Role: Counterpropaganda; Counterinsurgency; Counterintelligence; Covert operation Criminal investigation Crowd control Force protection Intelligence assessment Law enforcement Raiding; Security checkpoint

Commanders
- Leiter: SS-Oberführer and Police colonel Wilhelm Krichbaum

The Geheime Feldpolizei (German: [ɡəˈhaɪmə ˈfɛltpoliˌtsaɪ]; transl. "Secret Field Police"), shortened to GFP, was the secret military police of the German Wehrmacht from July 1939 until the end of the Second World War in 1945. Its units carried out plainclothes and undercover security work in the field. Their operations included clandestine operations, counterpropaganda, counterinsurgency, counterintelligence, formation of a counterinsurgency intelligence network, detection of treasonable activities, infiltration of resistance movements, gathering intelligence and destroying targets, protecting military installations, assisting the German Army (German: Heer) in courts-martial investigations, tracking and raiding targets to capture or kill, and setting-up security checkpoints in high-risk areas. GFP personnel, who were also classed as Abwehrpolizei, operated as an executive branch of the Abwehr (German armed-forces military intelligence), detecting resistance activity in Germany and in German-occupied Europe. They were known to torture and execute prisoners.

== Formation ==
The need for a secret military police developed after the German annexation of the Sudetenland in 1938 and the occupation of Bohemia in 1939. Although SS Einsatzgruppen units originally under the command of the Sicherheitspolizei ("Security Police"; SiPo) had been used during these operations, the Oberkommando der Wehrmacht (OKW, "Wehrmacht High Command") felt that it needed a specialist intelligence agency with police functions – one that could operate with the military, but act like a security service to arrest potential opponents and eliminate any resistance. After studying data collected in Spain, Austria and Czechoslovakia, Generaloberst Wilhelm Keitel, commander in chief of the OKW, issued the "Dienstvorschrift für die Geheime Feldpolizei" ("Regulations for the secret field police"), and the GFP was formed on 21 July 1939.

Although officially part of the Wehrmacht, the GFP mainly recruited its personnel from the Kriminalpolizei, the criminal investigation police who had been assigned to the armed forces. They were assigned the legal status of Wehrmachtsbeamte auf Kriegsdauer ("military officials for the duration of the war") and retained the authority of other police agencies as well as of the Sicherheitsdienst (SD), the intelligence organisation of the Nazi Party. Initially the Geheime Feldpolizei were exclusively Wehrmacht security units, but in 1942 the Reich Security Main Office (RSHA) absorbed them.

GFP agents could wear either civilian clothes or uniforms in the course of their duties. GFP officials had the right to pass through any military roadblocks and to enter military buildings. They could use military signals and communications equipment, commandeer military vehicles, and procure military supplies and accommodation wherever necessary in execution of their duty. In occupied areas the GFP provided personal escort to military VIPs, assistance to state-security agencies in counter-espionage, interrogation of suspects, prevention of sabotage and the detection of enemy agents.

In practice, GFP activity depended on the region in which it operated. Work in occupied northern and western Europe differed markedly from operations conducted on the Eastern Front. In the Netherlands, Denmark and Norway, GFP actions mainly concentrated on the secret-police protection of senior Wehrmacht officers. In Belgium and France the GFP became an executive part of the civilian police services, working alongside the military authorities to combat acts of resistance, the British Special Operations Executive, and sabotage. It used terror tactics such as detentions, deportations and the execution of hostages.

== Operations in occupied France ==
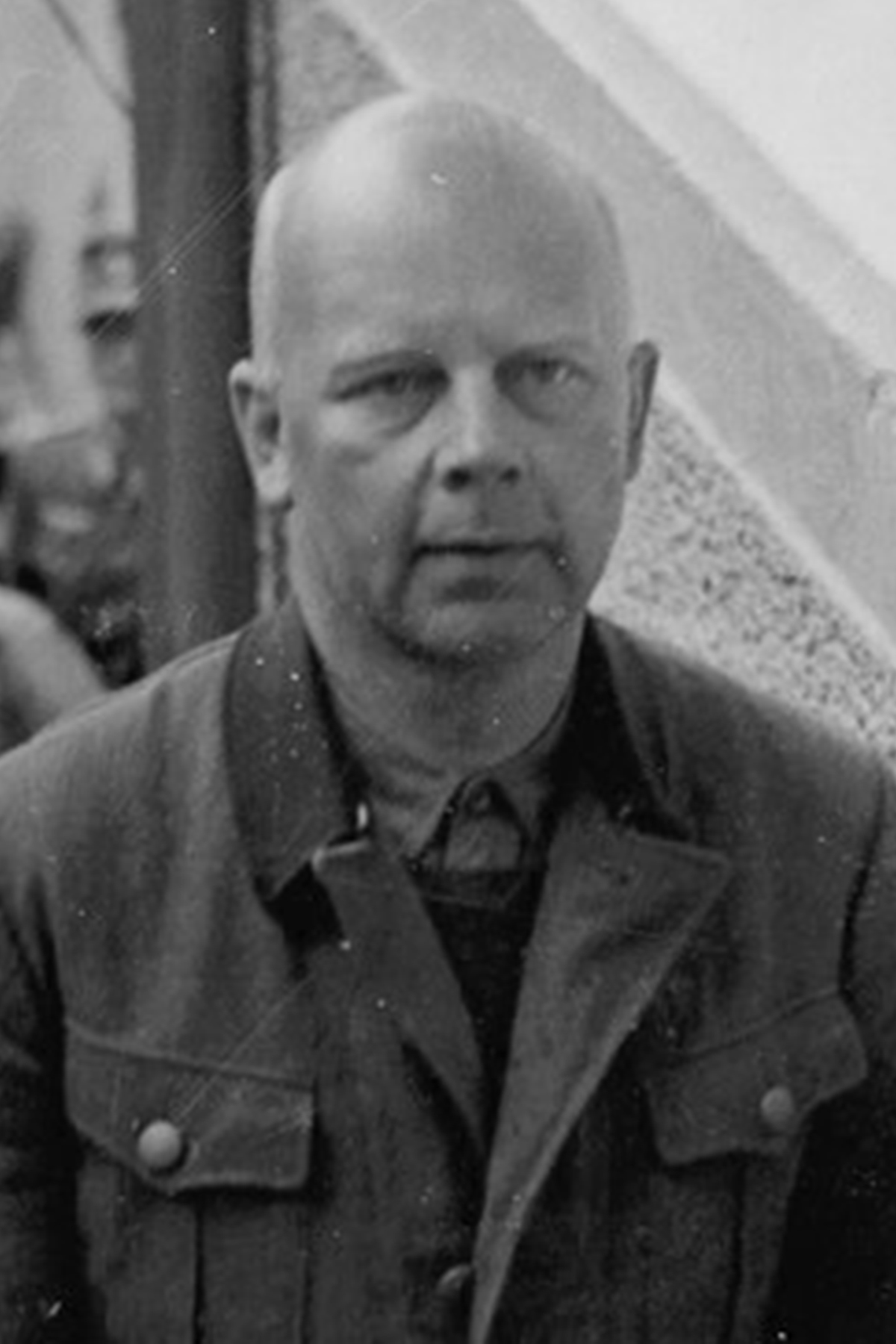
Karl Oberg, who restructured the GFP

Following the defeat of France in 1940, the GFP established its main headquarters at the Hôtel Bradford on the rue Saint Philippe du Roule in Paris (8ème arrondissement). Other sections for the departments of Nord and Pas de Calais were based at rue Traversière in Brussels. Despite their small numbers, the GFP constituted the "root" of the German police organ which terrorized the French people for four years of occupation.

Each GFP Gruppe consisted of a fifty-man unit until May 1942 when the entire command was restructured by SS-Brigadeführer Karl Oberg, the Higher SS and Police Leader (Höhere SS-und Polizeiführer, HSSPF) "Frankreich" (France). This reorganisation created the "Group 6/10" which contained the Kommando für Kapitalverbrechen (Capital crimes unit). It ran the infamous Balard shooting range at Issy-les-Moulineaux in the 15e arrondissement which was used to torture and execute 143 prisoners (though at the hands of the SS rather than the GFP).

The GFP oversaw the work done by the French Brigades Spéciales part of the Renseignements généraux. These units, which were part of the French police's intelligence service, specialised in tracking down so-called "internal enemies" (e.g. the French Resistance, the Comet Line that aided shot down Allied aircrews), Jews and those evading work conscription. The Special Brigades were based in room 35 of the Paris police headquarters. The Brigade Spéciale N°2 was notorious for using torture as well as leading investigations, manhunts, surveillance and interviews of suspects in Occupied France.

== Operations in Eastern Europe, Balkans and Greece ==
The Geheime Feldpolizei first began their pacification and security duties in 1939 following the invasion of Poland, oftentimes directed by SS personnel since they were integrated into the administrative fold of the other police organizations under control of the SS. Logistical support for these police units was frequently supplied by the local military commanders, which helped the GFP facilitate the process of transporting civilian prisoners "to places where they could be murdered." Original jurisdiction between the GFP and the Einsatzgruppen death squads in the Eastern theater was supposed to be clearly delineated and mutually reciprocal, but when the final negotiations about identified areas of responsibility took place in May 1941 between Generalquartiermeister Eduard Wagner and Gestapo chief Heinrich Müller, there was serious disagreement. Due to his expertise in matters of protocol, Walter Schellenberg replaced Müller and subsequently made important changes to the original draft, alterations which allowed the Einsatzgruppen to operate in both the rear areas of the army group and in the corps areas of the front. At the end of May 1941, Wagner and Reinhard Heydrich signed the agreement between the SS and the Oberkommando des Heeres (OKH, "Army High Command"), sealing the cooperative arrangement between the two organizations.

Throughout Eastern Europe and the Balkans, the GFP used constantly escalating terror against partisans, Jews and arbitrary "suspects". One particular event, which illustrates the complicity of the GFP in atrocities, was recorded by Lieutenant Colonel Helmuth Groscurth in August 1941. Near Kiev lies the town of Belaya Tserkov; it was here between 20 and 22 August 1941 that Groscurth learned from two chaplains that the GFP had turned over ninety children to Sonderkommando 4a, who were then placed under guard outside the city awaiting execution. After some delay, since Groscurth wanted the decision to kill the children to come from his superiors in the Sixth Army, they were shot.

Joint pacification programs were carried-out in the Zhytomyr region of Ukraine during the summer and fall of 1941 by combined units of SS and Wehrmacht Security Divisions. Participating in this campaign were Geheime Feldpolizei units 708, 721, and 730; their mission included pacification of areas behind the front, and protecting military installations and transportation routes. Additional activities consisted of pursuing the enemy into remote locations, carrying out arrests and reprisals, and executing partisans. Such actions were directly related to Operation Barbarossa and the infamous Commissar Order and as time went on increasing numbers of Security Divisions like the Geheime Feldpolizei contributed to more comprehensive "cleansing operations." Another task of the GFP was to help establish a new political administration in occupied Russia, which implied a political purge of Russian candidates and the "extermination" of an entire societal layer. Due in part to the expediencies of German war policy, the GFP operated outside the constraints of legal norms: their dealings with Bolsheviks and Commissars were not brought before military courts but were handled instead by the troops, with OKW approval. As a Nazi security warfare group, the GFP collaborated with the SD to execute and torture captured fighters and civilians suspected of helping the Soviet resistance. Officers in the Red Army and commissars were handed over to the SD, while known Communist party members and Jews were used by the Wehrmacht to clear minefields.

One of the more innocuous sounding bureaucratic expressions used to describe the "security" enterprise of the GFP was that they were given the task of "general supervision of the population" but this understatement cannot conceal the murderous operations in which they engaged. Persons simply found wandering in the occupied regions of Russia were turned over to the Geheime Feldpolizei or the SD since even the elderly, as well as women and children were suspected of conducting enemy reconnaissance. Anyone caught walking around and not promptly vouched-for by local authorities met a certain death as a result.

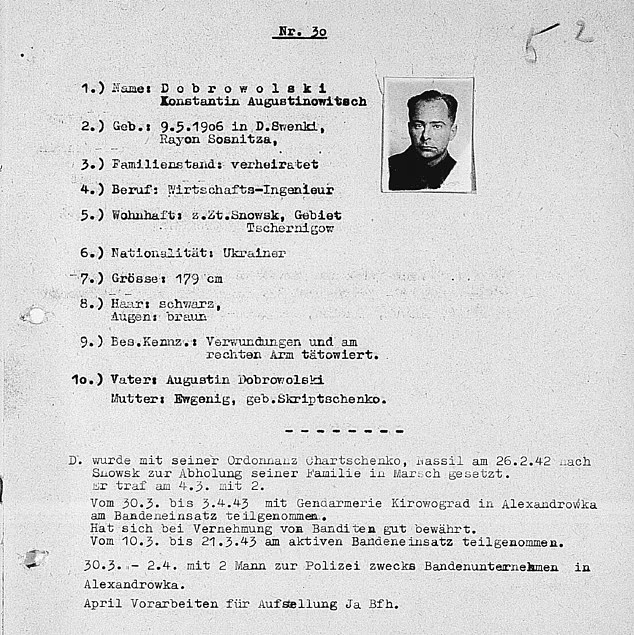
Personnel file of Constantine Dobrowolski (Nazi collaborator)

Segments of doctrine about combating potential partisans, guidelines which directed the actions of both the SD and the Geheime Feldpolizei stated that, "The enemy must be completely annihilated...The constant decision between life and death for partisans and suspicious persons is difficult even for the hardest soldier. It must be done. He acts correctly who fights ruthlessly and mercilessly with complete disregard for any personal surge of emotion." Eliminating so-called "security" threats entailed the murder of captured Jews; 10,000 of whom GFP unit 721 killed from October 1941 through January 1942 in the Ukrainian areas around Khmil’nyk, Lityn, and Brailov. To this end—in some places in Ukraine—the GFP operated independently in shooting Jews. The anti-Semitism of GFP members is typified by the observation of Unteroffizier Bergmayer, who in late March 1944, witnessing the deportations of Jews in northwestern Greece wrote,

The Greek population in the meantime had assembled in the streets and squares. With silent joy that one could read in their expressions they followed the departure of the Hebrews from their city. Only in a very few cases did a Greek permit himself to wave farewell to a member of the Jewish race. One could see clearly how the race was hated by old and young alike. Sympathy with their plight or unfavourable reactions to the action were not observed.... Altogether 1,725 members of the Jewish race were deported.

With the help of collaborators, the GFP also mounted operations to systematically burn down homes and entire villages. The GFP was also responsible for summarily executing prisoners before they could be liberated by the advancing Red Army. For example, in 1943 a GFP report to SS and Police Leader William Krichbaum stated that 21,000 people had been killed "some in combat, and many shot after interrogation" on the Eastern Front.

== Dealing with desertion or former captives ==
From mid-1943 onwards, the GFP was ordered to track down and capture all deserters after some Wehrmacht soldiers in France and the Soviet Union had begun joining partisan groups. By 1944, desertion rates rapidly rose following the major retreats after the Soviet Operation Bagration offensive and the destruction of German forces in the Falaise pocket in France. The Geheime Feldpolizei arrested 3,142 Wehrmacht personnel for desertion from Army Group Centre in 1944. But many troops were victims of increasingly confused rear areas where competing, often overlapping responsibilities of many military departments meant soldiers did not have the correct papers or were in the wrong locations. Convicted soldiers were either shot or sent to Strafbattalione. The GFP also investigated any claims of defeatism talk in ordinary infantry.

Another specialist unit called Gruppe 729 was created to interrogate all Wehrmacht soldiers who had managed to escape from Soviet captivity. The general fear was that the NKVD had "re-educated" these former captives to spread defeatism and anti-fascist propaganda (see Wehrkraftzersetzung). Soldiers suspected of being Soviet spies were sent to a special GFP camp at Danzig in present-day Poland. By 1944, the camp held 400 prisoners. Many were brutally beaten, starved, tortured, interrogated and subsequently executed.

== Organization ==
The Geheime Feldpolizei was commanded by the Heerespolizeichef (Chief of Army Police), who initially had the equivalent military rank of major. Subordinate to the Heerespolizeichef, but equivalent to the rank of major, was the Feldpolizeidirektor who was in charge of a GFP unit or Gruppe. On 24 July 1939, the title of Heerespolizeichef was upgraded to the military rank of Oberst.

A GFP unit in the Wehrmacht consisted of 50 personnel. This included:

- 1 Field director
- 32 Military police officers (higher and intermediate ranks)
- 17 Military support staff (e.g. drivers, clerks etc.)

However, after 1941, units sent to the Soviet Union were strengthened to 95 personnel.

- 1 Field director
- 54 Military police officers (higher and intermediate ranks). These could also include hilfsfeldpolizeibeamten (auxiliary field police officers) recruited from suitable soldiers.
- 40 Military support staff (e.g. drivers, clerks, security staff)

All groups were fully motorized. Their armaments were limited to light infantry weapons. In 1943, the Luftwaffe was given its own version of GFP. This resulted in another reorganisation of the ranks structure.

Although the GFP was a distinct military organisation, from its inception it generally carried out the same duties as the Gestapo and Kripo. Operations directed against populations in occupied countries employed methods similar to the SD and SS. This earned it the nickname "Gestapo der Wehrmacht" (English: Gestapo of the Wehrmacht). In 1944 the GFP units were put under the command of the RSHA.

At the end of the war, Heinrich Himmler, head of the SS, posed as a member of the GFP named Heinrich Hitzinger in an attempt to avoid capture, but unbeknownst to him, the GFP was on the Allied list of criminal organizations so he was detained at a checkpoint and handed over to British. He committed suicide the same day while in British custody.

=== Ranks ===
Ranks of the Geheime Feldpolizei
Insignia	Ranks	Comparative Wehrmacht rank
	Feldpolizeichef der Wehrmacht	Generalmajor
	Heerespolizeichef	Oberst
	Oberfeldpolizeidirektor	Oberstleutnant
	Feldpolizeidirektor	Major
	Feldpolizeikommissar	Hauptmann
	Feldpolizeiobersekretär/ Inspektor	Oberleutnant
	Feldpolizeisekretär	Leutnant
	Feldpolizeiassistent	All other NCOs.

== Post-war trials ==
After the war, the police organizations of Nazi Germany like the Gestapo and the Order Police battalions were classified as criminal in their general disposition for the wide array of crimes they committed. Despite the fact that the GFP dealt with security matters within the occupied territory for the army, during which they committed war crimes and even crimes against humanity to a wide degree, the International Military Tribunal at Nuremberg could not prove it was part of the Gestapo. This meant the organization (while under suspicion) did not come "within the charge of criminality contained in the Indictment, except such members as may have been transferred to Amt IV of the RSHA or were members of organisations declared criminal by this Judgment."

For a number of years, many former members of the GFP were able to return to a normal life, but this changed for some, as in April 1966, a trial was conducted in Vitebsk against four former Soviet POWs who had previously been assigned to a Geheime Feldpolizei; they had apparently taken part in the execution of Soviet citizens from 1941 through 1942 in Nevel, Polotsk, Smolensk, and Shumilino (Vitebsk oblast). Ten more former members of the Geheime Feldpolizei were brought to trial in Gomel during November and December 1967 and were alleged to be living in (then) West Germany; another trial was conducted against six members of the 57th Police Battalion during which ninety four witnesses appeared and named the German officers who committed the crimes. In 1973, an additional trial against seven members of the same battalion was conducted, and while no explicit crimes against Jews were mentioned, the defendants "were accused of having exterminated peaceful Soviet citizens."

== See also ==
- Feldgendarmerie, the uniformed Wehrmacht military police.
- Gestapo, the Nazi state secret police.
- Feldjägerkorps, formed in 1943, it became the senior military police service within the Wehrmacht.
- Kenpeitai, the military police of the Imperial Japanese Army from 1881 to 1945. (see also the IJN's Tokkeitai)
- Security Divisions, which were part of Wehrmacht's Army Group Rear Area Command on the Eastern Front

== Bibliography ==
- Adams, Jefferson (2009). Historical Dictionary of German Intelligence. Scarecrow Press.
- J. Muñoz, Antonio (2018). The German Secret Field Police in Greece, 1941-1944. McFarland Books. ISBN 978-1476667843.
- "Avalon Project–Yale University". Judgment of the International Military Tribunal (IMT) for the Trial of German Major War Criminals – Judgement: The Accused Organizations.
- Bartov, Omer (1991). Hitler's Army: Soldiers, Nazis, and War in the Third Reich. Oxford and New York: Oxford University Press. ISBN 978-0-19506-879-5.
- Beorn, Waitman Wade (2014). Marching into Darkness: The Wehrmacht and the Holocaust in Belarus. Cambridge, MA: Harvard University Press. ISBN 978-0-67472-550-8.
- Brown, Paul B. (2003). "The Senior Leadership Cadre of the Geheime Feldpolizei 1939–1945". Holocaust and Genocide Studies. 17 (2): 278–304. doi:10.1093/hgs/dcg002. ISSN 8756-6583.
- Browning, Christopher R. (2004). The Origins of the Final Solution: The Evolution of Nazi Jewish Policy, September 1939 – March 1942. Lincoln: University of Nebraska Press. ISBN 0-8032-1327-1.
- de Charles Jean-Léon. 1940–1942 Les Dossiers Secrets De La Police Allemande En Belgique – Tome 1 (La Geheime Feldpolizei en Belgique et dans le nord de la France).
- de Charles Jean-Léon. 1942–1944 Les Dossiers Secrets De La Police Allemande En Belgique – Tome 2 (La Geheime Feldpolizei en Belgique et dans le nord de la France).
- Delarue, Jacques (2008). The Gestapo: A History of Horror. New York: Skyhorse. ISBN 978-1-60239-246-5.
- Geßner, Klaus (1986). Geheime Feldpolizei. Zur Funktion und Organisation des geheimpolizeilichen Exekutivorgans der faschistischen Wehrmacht. Berlin: Militärverlag der Deutschen Demokratischen Republik. (Militärhistorische Studien NF 24, ZDB-ID 530624-3), (Unveränderter Nachdruck. Militärverlag, Berlin 2010, ISBN 978-3-360-02701-6).
- Henner, Sigurd; Böhler, Wolfgang (2013). Die deutsche Wehrmacht: Dienstgrade und Waffenfarben des Heeres 1939–1945 (in German). Czech Republic: Motorbuch. ISBN 978-3613036017.
- Hirszowicz, Lukasz (1993). "The Holocaust in The Soviet Mirror". In Dobroszycki, Lucjan; Gurock, Jeffrey S. (eds.). The Holocaust in the Soviet Union: Studies and Sources on the Destruction of the Jews in the Nazi-Occupied Territories of the USSR, 1941–1945. Armonk, NY: M.E. Sharpe. ISBN 1-56324-173-0.
- Hilberg, Raul (1985). The Destruction of the European Jews. New York: Holmes & Meier. ISBN 0-8419-0910-5.
- Longerich, Peter (2010). Holocaust: The Nazi Persecution and Murder of the Jews. Oxford; New York: Oxford University Press. ISBN 978-0-19-280436-5.
- Lower, Wendy (2005). Nazi Empire-Building and the Holocaust in Ukraine. London and Chapel Hill: The University of North Carolina Press. ISBN 978-0-80782-960-8.
- Mazower, Mark (2008). Hitler's Empire: How the Nazis Ruled Europe. New York; Toronto: Penguin. ISBN 978-1-59420-188-2.
- Michael, Robert; Doerr, Karin (2002). Nazi-Deutsch/Nazi-German. Westport, CT: Greenwood Press. ISBN 0-313-32106-X.
- Mosier, John (2006). Cross of Iron: The Rise and Fall of the German War Machine, 1918–1945. New York: Henry Holt & Co. ISBN 978-0-80507-577-9.
- Reitlinger, Gerald (1989). The SS: Alibi of a Nation, 1922–1945. New York: Da Capo Press. ISBN 978-0-30680-351-2.
- Steinberg, Jonathan (2002). All or Nothing: The Axis and the Holocaust 1941–43. London: Routledge. ISBN 978-0-41529-069-2.
- Streim, Alfred (1989). "The Tasks of the SS Einsatzgruppen". In Marrus, Michael (ed.). The Nazi Holocaust, Part 3, The 'Final Solution': The Implementation of Mass Murder, Volume 2. Westpoint, CT: Meckler. pp. 436–454. ISBN 0-88736-266-4.
- Warmbrunn, Werner (2012). The German Occupation of Belgium, 1940–1944. New York: Peter Lang Publishing Inc. ISBN 978-0-82041-773-8.
- Wette, Wolfram (2002). The Wehrmacht: History, Myth, Reality. Cambridge, MA: Harvard University Press. ISBN 978-0-67402-577-6.
- Williamson, Gordon (1989). German Military Police Units 1939–45. Osprey Publishing. ISBN 978-0850459029.
