= Special Brigades =

Internal security police in occupied Vichy France

During the Second World War, the Special Brigades (French: Brigades spéciales, or BS) were a French police force in Vichy France specializing in tracking down "internal enemies" (i.e. French Resistance workers), dissidents, escaped prisoners, Jews and those evading the obligatory labour service. It was dependent on the Direction centrale des renseignements généraux (RG) and worked in direct collaboration with the German civil, secret and military police, the Geheime Feldpolizei. It was based in room 35 on the first floor of the Paris Prefecture of Police. The Special Brigades was known to commit torture.

The Special Brigades were formed in March 1940 and tasked with suppressing communist activities. The Special Brigades was organized by the Director of General Information at the Prefecture of Police Lucien Rottée, who appointed Commissioner Fernand David as Head of the Special Brigades.

After the Liberation of France, 150 police officers from the Special Brigades were prosecuted. Sixty-four inspectors were sentenced, including twenty-two to the death penalty: ten were executed. Rottée and David were tried, condemned for treason and executed by firing squad at Fort de Montrouge on May 5 1945.

== See also ==
- Carlingue, French auxiliaries working for the Gestapo.
- Bezen Perrot, a Breton nationalist formation associated with the SS
