= Léon Goldberg =

French resistance member

- Born: 14 February 1924; Łódź, Łódź Voivodeship, Second Polish Republic
- Died: 21 February 1944 (aged 20); Fort Mont-Valérien, Paris, Military Administration in France
- Cause of death: Execution by firing squad
- Military career
- Allegiance: PCF
- Branch: FTP
- Unit: FTP-MOI

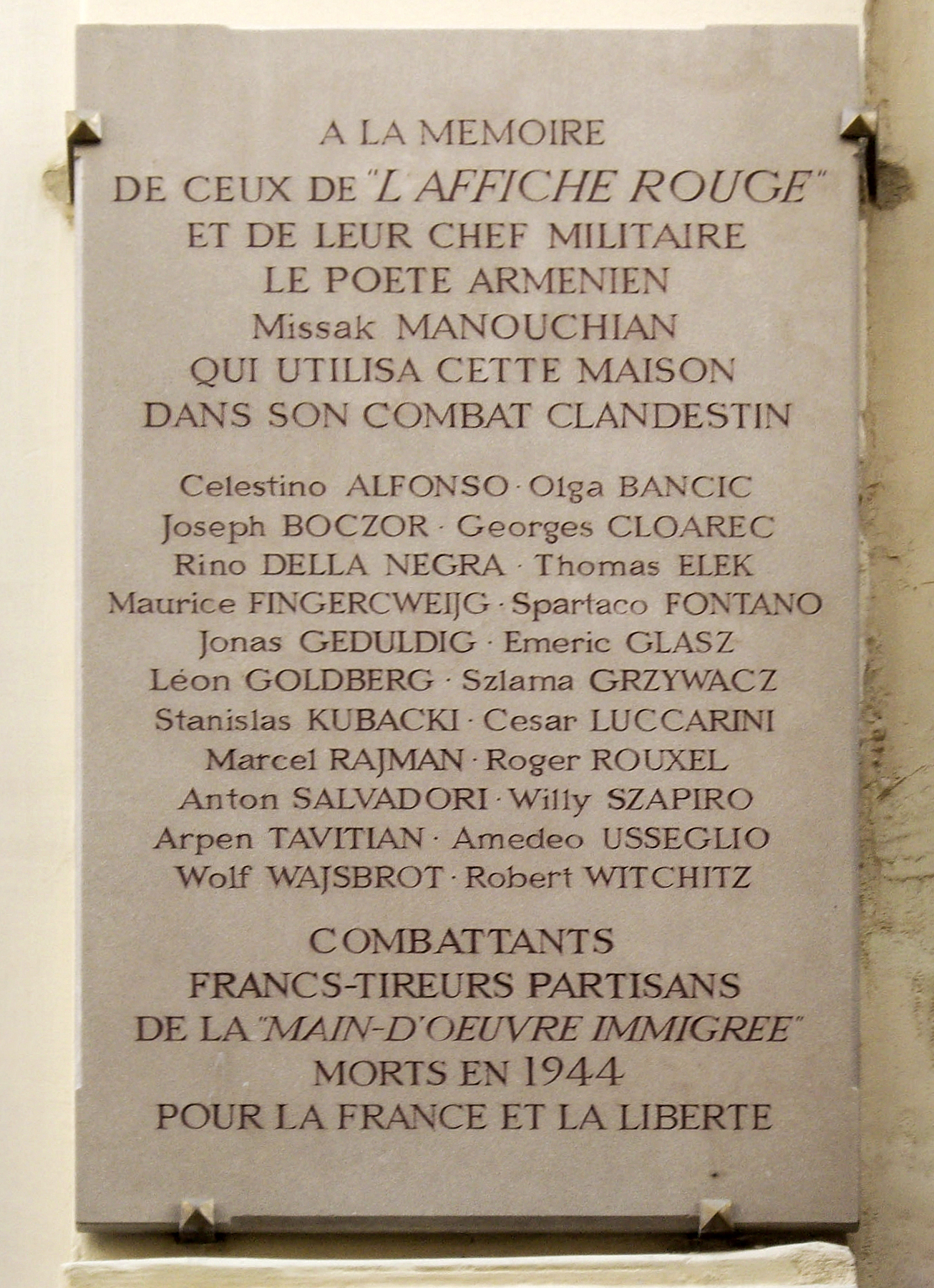
Commemorative plaque, 19 rue au Maire, Paris 3rd arrondissement. “In memory of those of the Red Poster and their military leader, the Armenian poet Missak Manouchian, who used this house in his clandestine struggle" among which is Leon Goldberg "who died in 1944 for France and freedom.”

Léon "Lejb" Goldberg, known as Julien (14 February 1924 in Łódź – 21 February 1944), was a Polish Jew and volunteer fighter in the French Liberation army FTP-MOI in the Manouchian Group.

== Biography ==
=== Youth ===
Goldberg was born in Łódź, Poland. In 1928, his father Samuel Goldberg (b. 1901), immigrated to France with his wife Riwka Gelemer and his son. They stayed in Paris where two other children were born, Henry in 1931 and Max in 1934.

=== World War II ===
When the mass arrest of more than 13,000 Jews, the Vel' d'Hiv Roundup, was carried out in Paris on 16 July 1942, Léon's parents sent him and his two brothers into hiding with a neighbour. His parents were arrested; his father was held at Beaune-la-Rolande and Camp of Royallieu transit camps before being deported to Auschwitz concentration camp on 31 July 1942. His mother and two brothers were held at the Pithiviers and Drancy transit camps, and deported to Auschwitz on 19 August 1942.

Goldberg was known within the resistance under the pseudonym "Julien", and his false papers were in the name of "Gérard Charton".

On 23 September 1943 Goldberg, Joseph Boczov and two other fighters from the FTP-MOI took a train to Brie-Comte-Robert. From there they made their way to Coubert, where they sabotaged the railway. The next day they took the train to Lieusaint to return to Paris.

On 21 October 1943 Goldberg, Boczov, Maurice Fingercwajg, Jonas Geduldig (called "Martiniuk"), Thomas Elek and a sixth resistance fighter, all from the MOI, left on a mission to stop a German convoy on the Paris-Troyes line at Grandpuits near Mormant. During the night they attacked a train with 51 wagons. 27 wagons were destroyed, blocking the two rails and destroying wheat, wood, assorted packages and aircraft engines. The guards were killed and the train driver was lightly injured. However, the fighters had been observed by the BS2. Three of the participants were killed or taken prisoner, and the other three escaped but were identified.

Goldberg was arrested at Mormant, and shot at the fort Mont Valérien on 21 February 1944 with the other members of the Affiche rouge.

== See also ==
- Francs-tireurs et partisans - Main-d'œuvre immigrée
- Affiche rouge
- French Resistance
- Brigades Spéciales
- Geheime Feld Polizei
