= Nicolae Cristea (communist) =

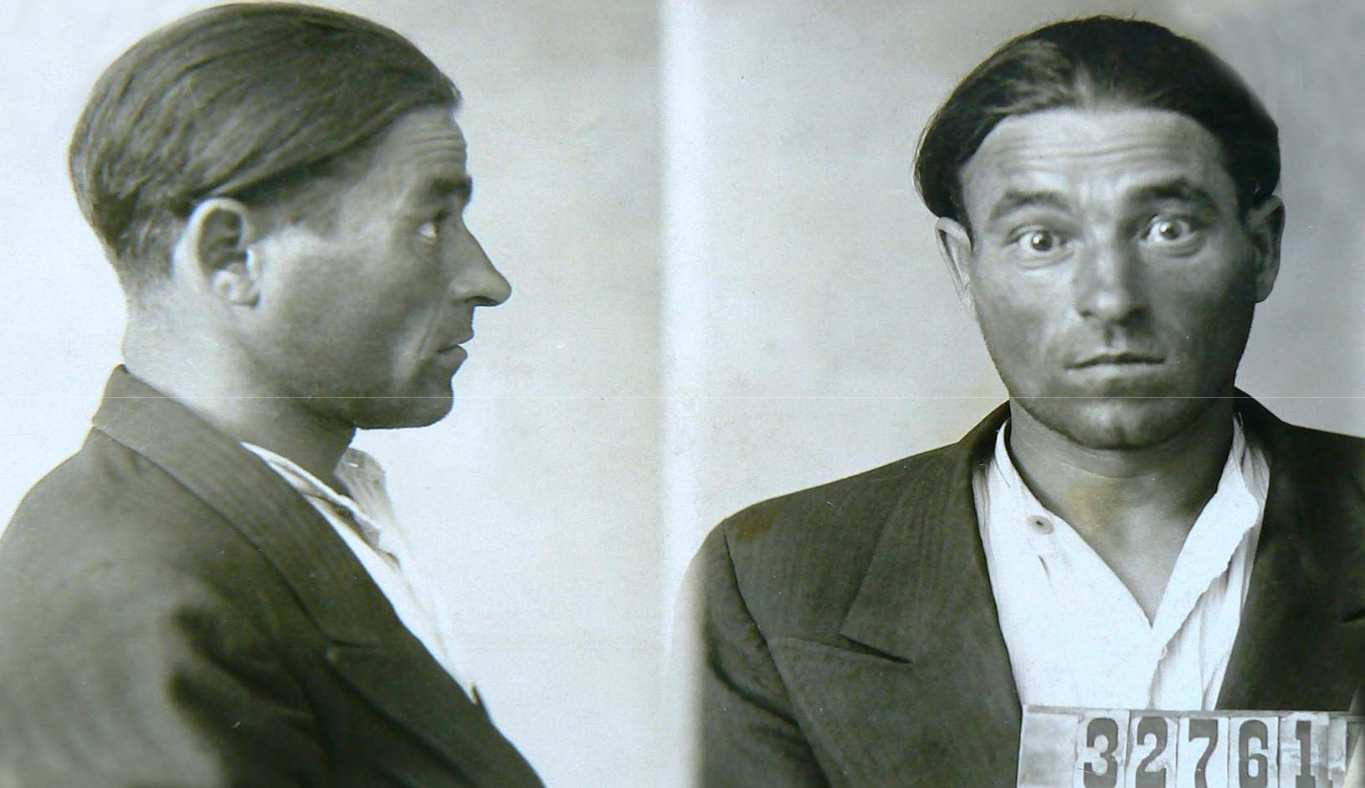
Mug shot of Cristea, taken by the Siguranța

Nicolas or Nicolae Cristea (also known under the nom de guerre Joseph Copla; 26 November 1906 – March 1943) was a Romanian communist, a volunteer in the International Brigades during the Spanish Civil War and in the French Resistance during World War II.

Cristea was born in a poor workers family in Galați. During the Great Depression he participated in the protests organized by the Romanian Communist Party in Bucharest, afterwards being forced by the Siguranța (Romania's secret police) to move back to his native town. He returned to Bucharest in 1931, and in 1933 was admitted into the then-illegal Communist Party. He became member in the Committee of the Bucharest Organization of the Party and, later, he was elected member in the Bureau of the Party Committee of the city. In this period he worked at the Army Pyrotechnics in Bucharest.

After the outbreak of the Spanish Civil War, he left for Spain, arriving there in October 1936, during the Battle for Madrid. He joined the Romanian Motorized Artillery Regiment of the XI International Brigade, commanded by Valter Roman. In 1937, he participated in the battles of Brunete, Quinto-Belchite and Teruel. In December 1937, during the latter confrontation, his leg was injured, but Cristea refused to be hospitalized, deciding instead to remain present on the battlefield. Afterwards, he was promoted to captain and became the commander of the "Tudor Vladimirescu" Battery. At the Battle of the Ebro, he had an important role in the crossing of the river. Demobilized along the other volunteers in December 1938, he continued to fight in Catalonia in January–February 1939.

In February 1939, Cristea passed into France where he was interned in the Gurs and Argelès concentration camps. Along with Joseph Boczov, Mihail Patriciu and other Romanians, he escaped the latter camp on 28 March 1941, after the onset of German occupation. The group soon joined the Resistance, with Cristea becoming commander of the Romanian detachment inside the FTP-Main-d'œuvre immigrée. He participated in sabotage action against the Nazi German forces. On 16 October 1942, he — along with other two Romanian volunteers —, attacked a group of German pilots who were taking part in a military exercise in Montrouge, near Paris, making use of hand grenades.

Arrested by the Gestapo on 19 October 1942, Cristea was executed in March 1943 at Fort Mont-Valérien, after months of torture in the Fresnes prison. Sources disagree on the exact date of his death: either the 9th, the 10th, or the 13th. Upon the end of World War II, he was posthumously promoted a Lieutenant-Colonel of the Romanian Army.
