= Willy Schapiro =

French resistance member

- Born: Salomon Wolf Willy Szapiro; 25 May 1910; Skała, Lublin Voivodeship, Second Polish Republic
- Died: 21 February 1944 (aged 33); Fort Mont-Valérien, Paris, Military Administration in France
- Cause of death: Execution by firing squad
- Military career
- Allegiance: PCF
- Branch: FTP
- Unit: FTP-MOI

Salomon Willy Schapiro Wolf (also Szapiro or Schapira) (25 May 1910 in Skała, Poland – 21 February 1944, executed at the fort Mont Valérien) was a Polish Jew, and a soldier in the FTP-MOI French liberation army in the Manouchian group.

== Youth ==
Schapiro left Poland around 1930 and emigrated to Palestine. He developed a workers' organisation whose aim was to hunt the British power which controlled the region after the dismantling of the Ottoman Empire in 1918. His activities brought about his arrest, then expulsion. He subsequently emigrated to Austria from 1933 to 1939.

== Second world war ==
In 1938, at the time of the Anschluss, Schapiro fled to Paris via Switzerland where he worked as a furrier, living in the 9th arrondissement. He joined the FTP-MOI in May 1943. He was arrested on 27 October 1943 in an attack on a German military convoy. He was tortured but did not reveal any information about his network.

Schapiro was condemned to death by the occupier, and he was executed by shooting at the fort Mont Valérien on 21 February 1944 with 23 members of the Manouchian group.

== See also ==
- Francs-tireurs et partisans - Main-d'œuvre immigrée
- Francs-tireurs et partisans
- Main-d'œuvre immigrée
- Affiche rouge
