= Rino Della Negra =

French footballer and resistance member (1923-1944)

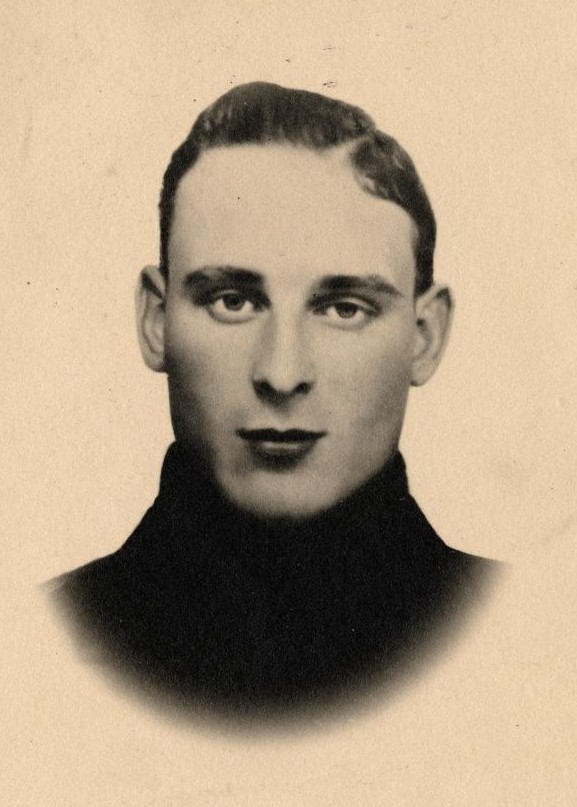

Personal information
- Date of birth: 18 August 1923
- Place of birth: Vimy, France
- Date of death: 21 February 1944 (aged 20)
- Place of death: Fort Mont-Valérien, France
- Positions: Goalkeeper; right winger

Youth career
- Argenteuil

Senior career*
Years	Team	Apps	(Gls)
1942–1943	Red Star Olympique		
- * Club domestic league appearances and goals

Rino Della Negra (18 August 1923 – 21 February 1944) was a French footballer who was active in the Resistance during World War II.

== Life and career ==
Della Negra was born in Vimy, France to Italian parents, and grew up in nearby Argenteuil. Playing as a goalkeeper or right winger, he began his football career with local club Argenteuil, before joining Red Star Olympique in mid-1942. Combining his playing career while working in a factory, Della Negra became active in the French Resistance in October 1942, and went into hiding in February 1943. Della Negra, a Communist, was a member of the Manouchian Group; he was wounded in an attack in November 1943, and he was executed by firing squad in February 1944. His execution, along with twenty two fellow résistants is the subject of the famous propaganda poster, l'"Affiche rouge". Before he died, Della Negra wrote a letter to his brother saying "hello and goodbye to Red Star." His brother was present on 21 February 2004 as the club revealed a plaque in his honour.
