= Léon Landini =

French resistance fighter and political activist (1926–2025)

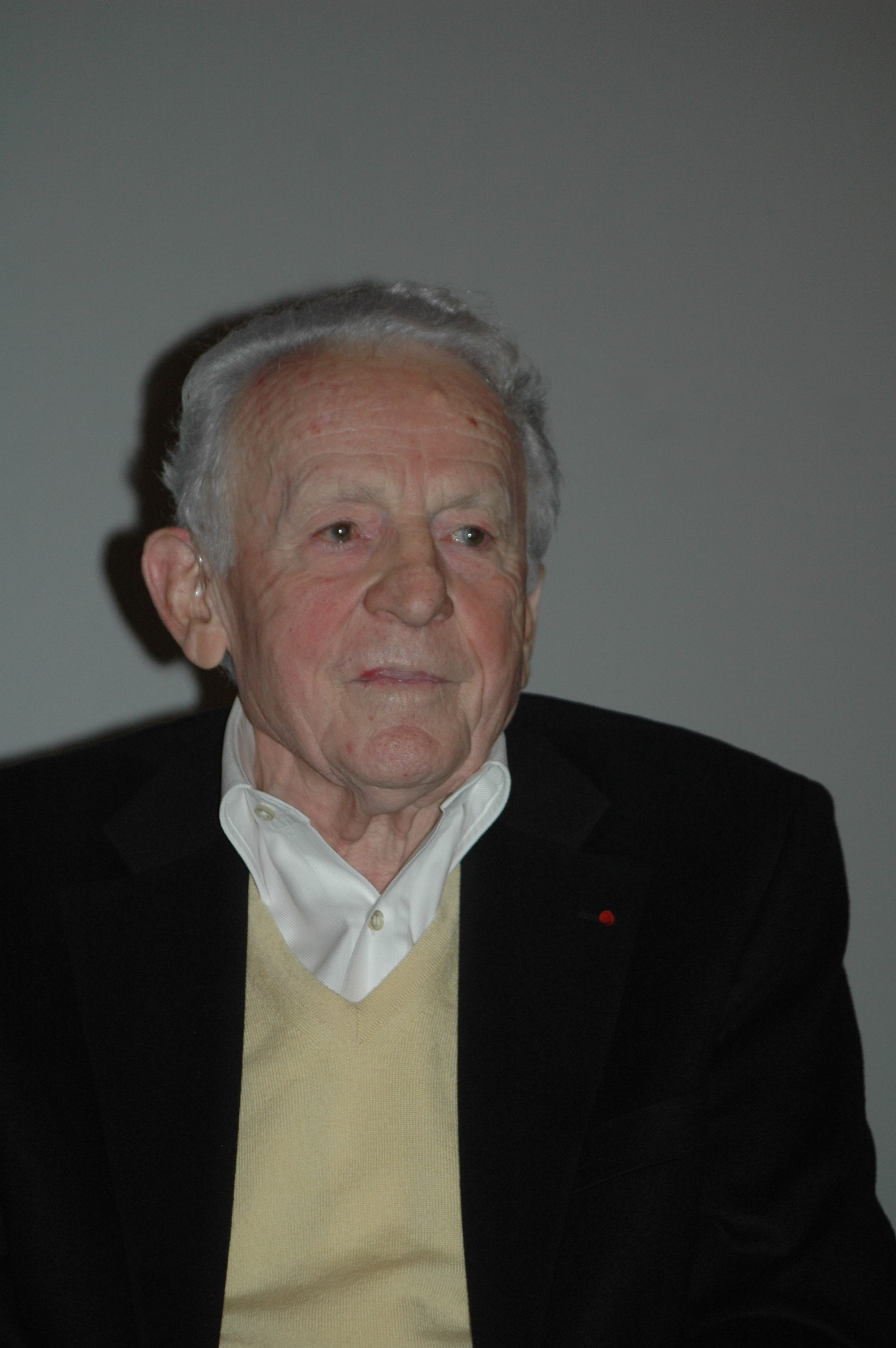
- Landini in 2013

President of the Pole of Communist Revival in France
- In office 2004–2006

Personal details
- Born: 9 April 1926 Saint-Raphaël, France
- Died: 21 September 2025 (aged 99) Versailles, France
- Party: PCF (1942–2004); PCRF (2004–2025)
- Occupation: Forester

Léon Landini (French: [leɔ̃ lɑ̃dini]; 9 April 1926 – 21 September 2025) was a French resistance fighter and political activist of the French Communist Party and the Pole of Communist Revival in France.

== Biography ==
Born in Saint-Raphaël on 9 April 1926, Landini's father, Aristide, immigrated to France from Tuscany to escape the Mussolini regime. Léon joined the Francs-tireurs et partisans – main-d'œuvre immigrée (FTP-MOI), a communist component of the French Resistance to Nazi Germany. In May 1943, he was arrested alongside his eldest son, Roger, while under the Italian occupation. They escaped in November 1943 during their deportation to Germany.

During the German occupation, Landini joined the French Communist Party and the FTP-MOI along with his two sisters. On 12 October 1942, he participated in the sabotage of a railway in Saint-Raphaël en route to Cannes, which caused the train's derailment and destroyed German merchandise. He also participated in the sabotage of a bauxite mine Brignoles, attacked an Italian army barracks in Fréjus, and unsuccessfully bombed a hotel in Saint-Raphaël. He also took resistance actions in Lyon, where he met Alter Mojze Goldman. He was once again arrested on 25 July 1944 by the Milice and sent to Montluc prison. After enduring relentless torture, he was freed in the midst of the Insurrection de Villeurbanne. After Liberation, he was hospitalized several times before his demobilization in February 1946.

Landini returned to Saint-Raphaël and rejoined his family, working as a forester. In 1963, he moved to Paris and worked in collective restoration. In Montrouge, he was reunited with Mojze Goldman, with whom he became friends. In the 1990s, he opposed the French Communist Party's transformation under the leadership of Robert Hue and founded the Pole of Communist Revival in France in 2004 alongside Georges Hage and became its founding president. In 2011, he was one of the signatories of the Appel de Thorens-Glières along with Raymond Aubrac, Daniel Cordier, Stéphane Hessel, Pierre Pranchère, Georges Séguy, and other figures of the French Resistance. The appeal demanded that candidates in the 2012 presidential election to rediscover the values of the Liberation embodied by the National Council of the Resistance.

Landini died in Versailles on 21 September 2025, at the age of 99.

== Decorations ==
- Resistance Medal (1947)
- Officer of the Legion of Honour (1998)
- Volunteer Combatant's Cross
- Cross of the Resistance Volunteer Combatant
- Friendship Medal of Cuba (2024)

== War mémoirs ==
Landini served as president of the Amicale des anciens FTP MOI des bataillons Carmagnole-Liberté. Alongside Henri Krischer, he donated archives of the Resistance to the Musée de la Résistance nationale in Champigny-sur-Marne. The Bataillon Carmagnole-Liberté was honored with a plaque in Villeurbanne thanks to advocacy from Charles Hernu. In 2005, he petitioned for a square in Paris to be named after Joseph Epstein, which was successful thanks to support from Mayor Bertrand Delanoë and Councillor Pierre Mansat. In 2013, he was featured in a documentary titled Les Jours Heureux, directed by Gilles Perret. The documentary covered the story of the Programme du Conseil national de la Résistance. As the last survivor of the FPT-MOI, he was invited to the burial of Missak Manouchian and Mélinée Manouchian at the Panthéon on 21 February 2024. He was welcomed by President Emmanuel Macron and sat next to fellow resistance fighter Robert Birenbaum. He expressed his opposition to the attendance of National Rally members at the burial.
