= Olga Bancic =

Jewish Romanian communist activist

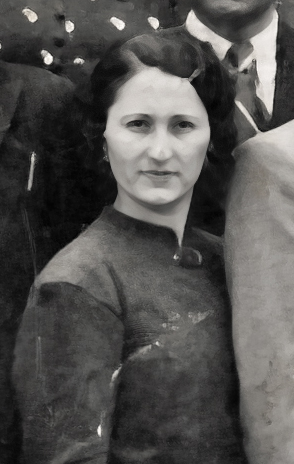
- Portrait of Bancic from a group photo during the 6th congress of the French branch of the HOG, 1937
- Born: Golda Bancic; May 10, 1912; Kishinev,^{α} Bessarabia Governorate, Russian Empire
- Died: May 10, 1944 (aged 32); Stuttgart, Gau Württemberg-Hohenzollern, Greater German Reich
- Cause of death: Execution
- Other name: Pierrette
- Spouse: Jacob Solomon
- Children: Dolores Jacob
- Military career
- Allegiance: FTP
- Branch: FTP-MOI
- Service years: 1940 - 1944
- Unit: Groupe Manouchian
- Known for: Last known person decapitated by axe in Europe
- Conflicts: WWII
- Occupation: Factory worker
- Political party: PCF
- Other political affiliations: PCR
- Movement: Communism

Olga Bancic (Romanian: [ˈolɡa ˈbant͡ʃik]; born Golda Bancic; also known under her French nom de guerre Pierrette; 10 May 1912 – 10 May 1944) was a Jewish Romanian communist activist, known for her role in the French Resistance. A member of the FTP-MOI and Missak Manouchian's Group, she was captured by Nazi German forces in late 1943, and executed about six months later. Bancic was married to the writer and fellow FTP-MOI fighter Alexandru Jar. She was the last person decapitated by axe or similar (and not via guillotine) in Germany, and the last known in Europe.

== Biography ==
Bancic was born to a Jewish family in Chișinău, Bessarabia, which was part of the Russian Empire at the time, becoming part of the Romanian Kingdom after World War I. She worked in a mattress factory by the age of 12, and joined the labor movement, taking part in a strike during which she was arrested and allegedly beaten. Bancic, who became a member of the outlawed Romanian Communist Party (PCR), was subsequently arrested several times. In 1936, she traveled to France, where she aided local left-wing activists in transporting weapons to Spanish Republican forces fighting in the Civil War.

Shortly before the outbreak of World War II, Bancic gave birth to Dolores, her daughter with Alexandru Jar, named after Dolores Ibárruri ("la Pasionaria"). She left Dolores in the care of a French family following the start of the German occupation, and joined the Paris-based Francs-tireurs et partisans – main-d'œuvre immigrée (FTP-MOI), taking part in about 100 sabotage acts against the Wehrmacht (Armed forces of Nazi Germany), and being personally involved in the manufacture and transport of explosives. This came at a time when the PCR, weakened by successive crackdowns, had become divided into several autonomous groups. Similar to Gheorghe Gaston Marin, Bancic was among the Romanian activists who were integrated into the French Communist Party.

Arrested by the Gestapo on 6 November 1943, she was subject to torture, but refused to give information about her comrades. After the arrest of the Manouchian Group, the Gestapo published a series of propaganda posters, named l'Affiche Rouge, which depicted its members, Bancic included, as "terrorists".

On 21 February 1944, she, Manouchian, and 21 others were sentenced to death—all male defendants were executed later that day at Fort Mont-Valérien; since a French law prohibited women from being executed by firing squad, the typical means of disposing of members of the resistance, Bancic, the only female in the Group, was deported to Stuttgart and decapitated in the local prison's courtyard at 6 am on her 32nd birthday and was buried the same day. During her transportation to the place of execution, she composed a letter to her daughter Dolores, who was known under the name Dolores Jacob, on a piece of paper which she threw out a window.

== Legacy ==
Bancic's widower, Alexandru Jar, returned to Romania at the end of the war, and established a career under the new Communist regime. During the 1950s, he became a noted opponent of the Party leadership around Gheorghe Gheorghiu-Dej, and, together with Mihail Davidoglu and Ion Vitner, faced criticism from activist Miron Constantinescu over his "intellectualist-liberalist tendencies".

Several streets were named in Bancic's honor, and small monuments were erected in her memory, along with a wall plaque in the PCF plot at Ivry Cemetery in Ivry-sur-Seine. Her name continued to be used as an asset by Communist authorities, but it fell into disuse after the 1989 Revolution. In 2005, writer and journalist Bedros Horasangian objected to the initiatives of Bucharest officials to remove the Polonă Street commemorative plaque making mention of her activities and to rename a street previously bearing her name, arguing that: "It is not proper and insults the memory of a woman who actually died for Allied victory (when Romania was allied to the Germans!). [...] In France, those who have fought in the antifascist resistance enjoy full respect".

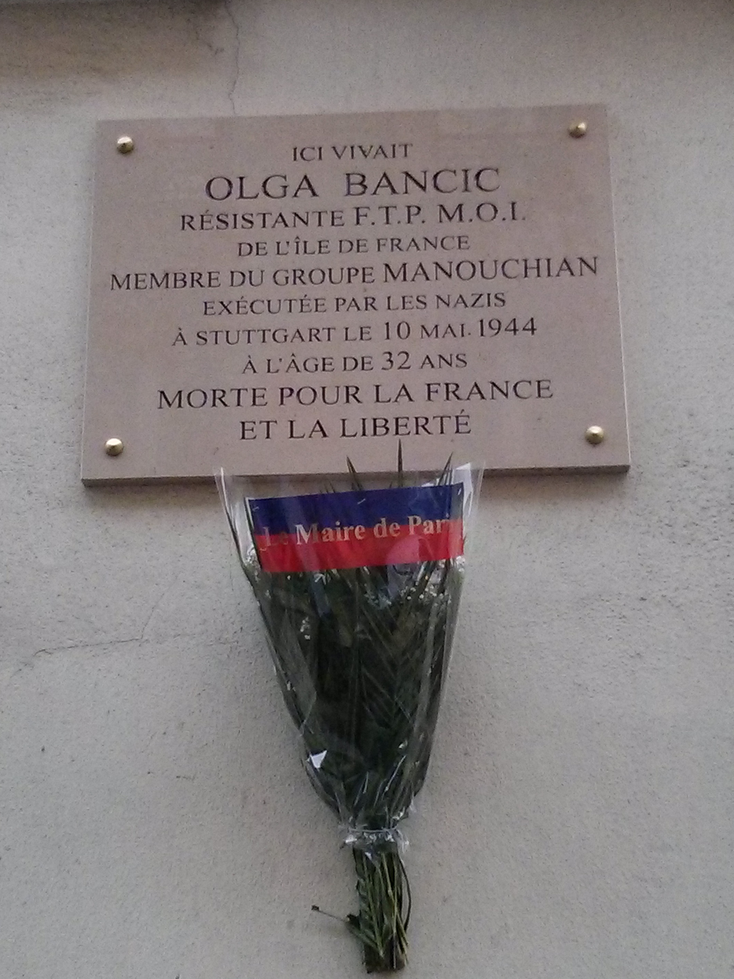

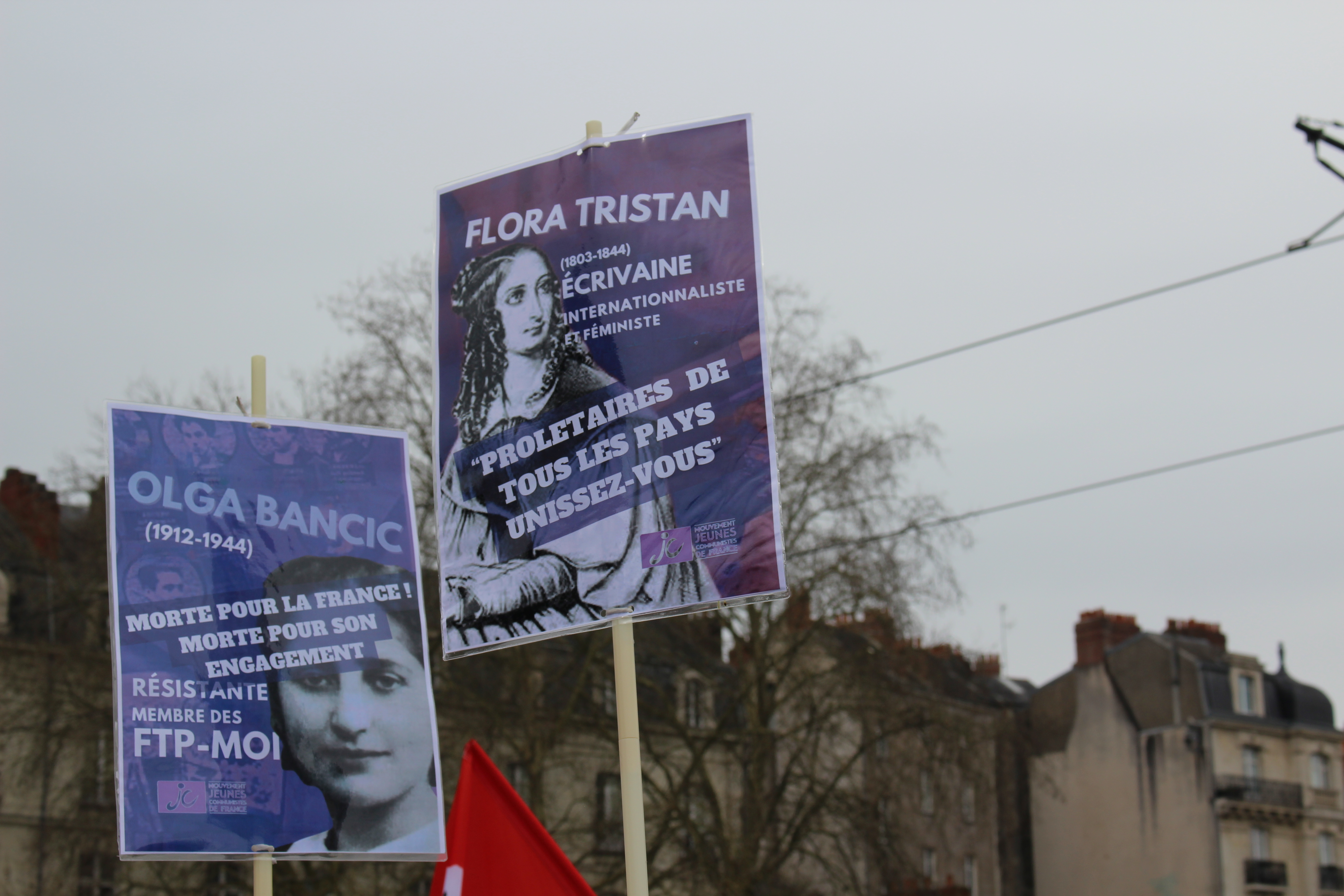

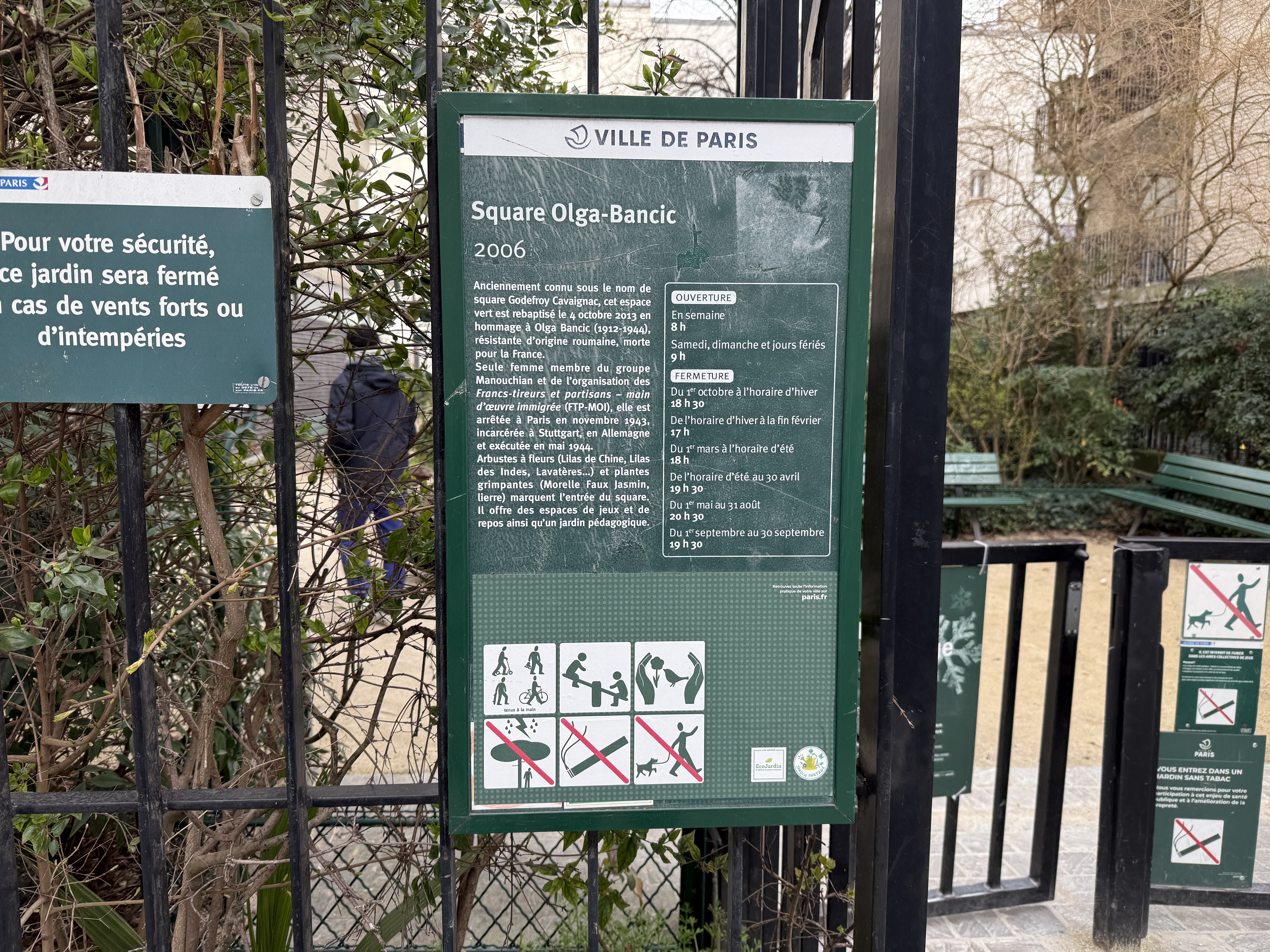
Tributes to Bancic in the 21st century, including flowers at her memorial, on 114 rue du Chateau, 14th arrondissement, Paris, her image on a placard during a union demonstration in Nantes, 2024, and a park sign named after her in the 11th arrondissement of Paris

== Notes ==
^α Modern day Chișinău, Moldova
