= Cloarec =

- Pronunciation: pronounced [ˈklwɑːrek]

Origin
- Meaning: clerk, seminarian, ecclesiastic.
- Region of origin: Brittany

Other names
- Variant forms: Clouarec, Cloarech, Cloérec, Cloirec, Clorec, Clouérec, Le Cloarec, Le Cloerec, Le Cloirec

Cloarec (Kloareg in Modern Breton) is a surname. Notable people with the surname include:

- Françoise Cloarec (born 1957), French writer
- Georges Cloarec (1932–1944), French resistant
- Joël Cloarec (born 1966), French football player and manager
- Nicolas Cloarec (born 1977), French football player
- Pierre Cloarec (1909–1994), French road bicycle racer
