= FTP-MOI =

Sub-group in the French Resistance

The Francs-tireurs et partisans – main-d'œuvre immigrée (FTP-MOI) were a sub-group of the Francs-tireurs et partisans (FTP) organization, a component of the French Resistance. A wing composed mostly of foreigners, the MOI maintained an armed force to oppose the German occupation of France during World War II. The Main-d'œuvre immigrée was the "Immigrant Movement" of the FTP.

The last surviving member of the FTP-MOI's Manouchian Group, resistance fighter Arsène Tchakarian, died in August 2018.

== History ==
The FTP-MOI groups were organized in the Paris region in 1941, at the same time as the Francs-tireurs et partisans. Their ranks were filled with foreign communists living in France who were not part of the French Communist Party. Although integrated with the FTP, these groups depended directly on Jacques Duclos, who passed on orders from the Communist International (Comintern). The national manager of the MOI was Adam Rayski, who recommended members for the FTP-MOI.

Members also included other immigrants, especially many young Hungarian writers, artists and intellectuals. Among them were the painter Sándor Józsa; sculptor István Hajdú (Étienne Hajdu); journalists László Kőrösi and Imre Gyomra; photographers André (Andras) Steiner, Lucien Hervé, and Ervin Marton; and printer Ladislas Mandel.

The FTP-MOI were among the most active and determined of the resistance groups; particularly because they were foreigners and mostly Jews, they were under the direct watch of the Vichy regime and the Germans. Without maintaining strict secrecy, they risked internment, deportation and death. Because they depended directly on the Comintern, with Duclos as their intermediary, they were often on the front line when the order to fight came from Moscow. The various French groups were more attentive to the French national political climate.

The Parisian groups were initially led by Boris Holban, then the poet turned activist Missak Manouchian. After Manouchian was arrested in 1943 and executed in February 1944, Holban took over again.

The FTP-MOI are particularly well known because of the highly publicized trial of numerous members of the Manouchian Group. Tracked, arrested and interrogated by the French police, the show trial of the 23 members was held in front of a German military tribunal at the Hôtel Continental. It began on 17 February 1944, lasted between two and four days, and after a 30-minute deliberation, the court reached the following verdict: All of the accused were condemned to death, with no possibility of appeal.

All but two were shot immediately on 21 February at Mont-Valérien. The execution of Olga Bancic was suspended for further enquiry and because French law prohibited executing women by firing squad. In a new sentence passed on her birthday of 10 May 1944 at Stuttgart, she was condemned to death. She was beheaded shortly after the sentencing. One accused, Migratulski, was transferred to French jurisdiction.

=== Affiche rouge ===
Following the trial and executions, the Germans created a poster with a red background, featuring ten men of the Manouchian group with their names, photos and alleged crimes; it became known as l'Affiche Rouge. The Germans distributed thousands of copies of the poster around the city to encourage Parisians to think of the partisans as criminal foreigners and "not French", and discourage resistance; instead, the red posters inspired citizens to more actions. Some marked the posters with phrases such as Morts pour la France! (They died for France.)

== Structure of the FTP-MOI ==
=== Paris region, Groupe Manouchian ===
The group in Paris was commanded by Boris Holban from April 1942 to July 1943. From July 1943 to November 1943, the group was led by Joseph Epstein and Missak Manouchian. Holban commanded the group again from December 1943 to August 1944. The armed group had the following members:

- Celestino Alfonso – Spaniard
- Olga Bancic – Jewish Romanian
- Joseph Boczov – Jewish Hungarian/Romanian
- Georges Cloarec – French Breton
- Rino Della Negra— French Italian
- Thomas Elek – Jewish Hungarian
- Maurice Fingercwajg – Polish Jew
- Spartaco Fontanot – Italian
- Imre Glasz – Jewish Hungarian
- Jonas Geduldig – Polish Jew
- Elise Gerchinovitz – French Jew
- Léon Goldberg – Polish Jew
- Szlama Grzywacz – Polish Jew
- Stanislas Kubacki – Polish
- Arpen Tavitian – Armenian
- Cesare Luccarini – Italian
- Missak Manouchian – Armenian
- Boris Milev - Bulgarian
- Marcel Rayman – Polish Jew
- Roger Rouxel – French
- Antonio Salvadori – Italian
- Willy Schapiro – Polish Jew
- Arsène Tchakarian – Armenian. Tchakarian, the last surviving member of the Manouchian Group, died on 4 August 2018, at the age of 101.
- Amadeo Usseglio— Italian
- Wolf Wajsbrot – Polish Jew
- Robert Witchitz – French

=== Lyon region, Compagnie Carmagnole-Liberté ===
The armed group Carmagnole in Lyon and the armed group Liberté in Grenoble had the following members:

- Herbert Herz, who was a member of both groups.
- Léon Centner
- Jacques Viktorovitch
- Léon Landini – Last surviving FTP-MOI member, died on September 22, 2025 at the age of 99.
- Simon Fryd
- Elie Amselem
- Max Tzwangue
- Léon Rabinovitch
- Léopold Rabinovitch
- Paul Mossovic
- Nathan Chapochnik
- Rywka Chapochnik

=== Toulouse region, 35th Brigade ===
The 35th Brigade took its name from the thirty-five divisions of gunners of the International Brigades, to which Marcel (Mendel) Langer, head of the regional FTP-MOI, had claimed to belong. In February 1943, Langer was arrested carrying explosives. He was tried by the section spéciale of the Toulouse appeals court. The avocat général, Lespinasse, demanded his execution and, on 21 March 1943, Langer was sentenced to death. He was executed on 23 July 1943.

The 35th Brigade then called themselves the Brigade Marcel Langer in his honor. Eighteen members were arrested by the Vichy police and handed over to the Germans. Two died of unknown causes on the train transporting them to be deported. Four were shot.

== In popular culture ==
- The Spanish writer Jorge Semprún wrote a postwar novel referring to the FTP-MOI in Paris. He had also served in the Resistance, first with the FTP-MOI, and then with the FTP after he joined the Communist Party. He was captured and deported, but survived internment at Buchenwald.
- There have been numerous portrayals of the Resistance in novels.

=== Filmography ===
- Stéphane Courtois and Mosco Boucault, Des terroristes à la retraite, broadcast by Antenne 2 in 1983, included interviews of surviving FTP-MOI members and families of the victims. It accused the Communist Party in France (PCF) of betraying the Manouchian Group.
- Mosco Boucault (director), Ni travail, ni famille, ni patrie – Journal d’une brigade FTP-MOÏ (1993), documentary about the Toulouse 35th Brigade
- Étrangers et nos frères pourtant (Foreigners and yet our brothers) – 2x26mn (1994), First part: Liberté, guérilla urbaine à Lyon et Grenoble Francs-Tireurs et Partisans de la Main-d’œuvre Immigrée (FTP-MOI), Second part: Carmagnole : l’insurrection de Villeurbanne. About actions of the FTP-MOI in Lyon and Grenoble. A video documentary by Claude and Denis Collins Cugnot, the title was taken from the poem/song "L'affiche rouge" (Words: Louis Aragon . Music: Jean Ferrat, Maurice Vandair).
- La traque de l’Affiche rouge, a documentary produced by Denis Peschanski and Jorge Amat, broadcast by France 2 on 15 March 2007, refuted Courtois and Boucault's allegations.
- The dramatic film L'Armée du crime (2009) features the story of the Manouchian Group. Directed by Robert Guédiguian, a Marseille-based filmmaker of German and Armenian parentage, it was adapted from a story by Serge Le Péron. It reflects some of the divisions among the Résistance.

== Bibliography ==
- Claude COLLIN, Carmagnole et Liberté. Les étrangers dans la Résistance en Rhône-Alpes, PUG, 2000
- Claude LEVY(*), Raymond LEVY(*), Une histoire vraie, Paris : Les éditeurs français réunis, 1953
- Claude LEVY(*), Les parias de la résistance, Paris : Calmann-Lévy, 1970
- Jean-Yves BOURSIER, La guerre de partisans dans le Sud-Ouest de la France, 1942–1944. La 35e Brigade FTP-MOI, Paris : L’Harmattan, 1992
- Gérard de VERBIZIER, Ni travail, ni famille, ni patrie. Journal d’une brigade F.T.P.-M.O.I., Toulouse, 1942–1944, Paris : Calmann-Lévy, 1994
- Marc BRAFMAN(*), « Les origines, les motivations, l’action et les destins des combattants juifs (parmi d’autres immigrés) de la 35e Brigade FTP-MOI de Marcel Langer, Toulouse 1942-1944 », in : Le Monde juif, n° 152, pp. 79–95, 09-12/1994
- Damira TITONEL-ASPERTI(*), Carmela MALTONE, Ecrire pour les autres. Mémoires d’une résistante. Les antifascistes italiens en Lot-et-Garonne sous l’occupation, Presses universitaires de Bordeaux, 1999
- Jean-Loup GASSEND, Autopsy of a Battle, the Allied Liberation of the French Riviera, Schiffer, 2014
- Greg LAMAZERES, Marcel Langer, une vie de combats. 1903-1943. Juif, communiste, résistant... et guillotiné, Toulouse : Privat, 2003
- Henri SOUM, Chronique des bords de Garonne, t. 3 « Le Vent des Fous », Ed. Signes du monde, 1994
- Marc Levy, Les enfants de la liberté, Paris: Editions Robert Laffont, 2007.
- F.F.I. – F.T.P.F., Pages de gloire des vingt-trois, Paris: Immigration, 1951.
- Philippe Robrieux, L'Affaire Manouchian – Vie et mort d'un héros communiste, Paris: Fayard, 1986.

(*) Former member of the 35 Brigade FTP-MOI "Marcel Langer"

== See also ==
- Affiche rouge
- Österreichische Freiheitsfront (An Austrian communist resistance network in Belgium)
