= Léon Centner =

French resistance fighter and book publisher (1919–2002)

- Born: December 16, 1919; Warsaw, Poland
- Died: June 13, 2002 (aged 82); Paris, France
- Occupations: Bookseller, publisher
- Organization(s): Society for Robespierrist Studies; National Movement Against Racism (1942); Mavericks and Partisans – Immigrant Labor (1942); Union of Jews for Resistance and Mutual Aid (1943); French Communist Party (until 1956);

Léon Centner (born December 16, 1919, near Warsaw, Poland; died June 13, 2002, in Paris, France) was a French resistance fighter, bookseller, bibliophile and publisher. In 1966, Centner co-founded the influential French publishing house Éditions d'histoire sociale internationale (EDHIS) which specialised in republishing significant works of social history and 19th century periodicals.

== Biography ==
Léon Centner was born in Warsaw into a Polish Jewish family. His family moved to France in 1923, when he was 4 years old. He obtained his school certificate at the age of 13, then worked in a hosiery workshop. During the Second World War, he left Paris for Grenoble, where he joined the communist resistance unit MOI. He was active in the National Movement Against Racism (MNCR), whose goal was to help children at risk of deportation, and joined the combat groups of UJRE in Lyon. He played an important role in the national distribution of the clandestine newspapers J'accuse and Fraternité, produced false papers for members of the resistance and financed resistance activity.

After the war, he resumed his work in hosiery alongside his brother Oscar Centner and was an active member of the French Communist Party until his exclusion from the party in 1956. He became a naturalized French citizen and married Annette Szalai, a Hungarian who Centner had met through the MNCR. Annette herself had been an important resistance fighter under the pseudonym Renée Girard.

== From bibliophile to publisher ==
Centner was an avid collector of rare books. He made friends with second-hand booksellers and opened a shop, first on Rue Vivienne, then under the arcades of the Palais-Royal. In 1966, he co-founded EDHIS with the bookseller Michel Bernstein, which specialized in the reprinting of rare texts. EDHIS reprinted Le Fils du Père Duchêne's Éphémérides du citoyen in ten volumes, in collaboration with Albert Soboul, as well as other hard-to-find 19th century works. EDHIS's publications focused on the social revolutions of the 19th century and the development of the Labour movement, as well as the beginnings of the French Revolution of 1789. EDHIS ceased printing in 1995.

Léon Centner was a member of the Society for Robespierrist Studies for 25 years.
