= Arsène Tchakarian =

Arsène Tchakarian Արսեն Չաքարեան
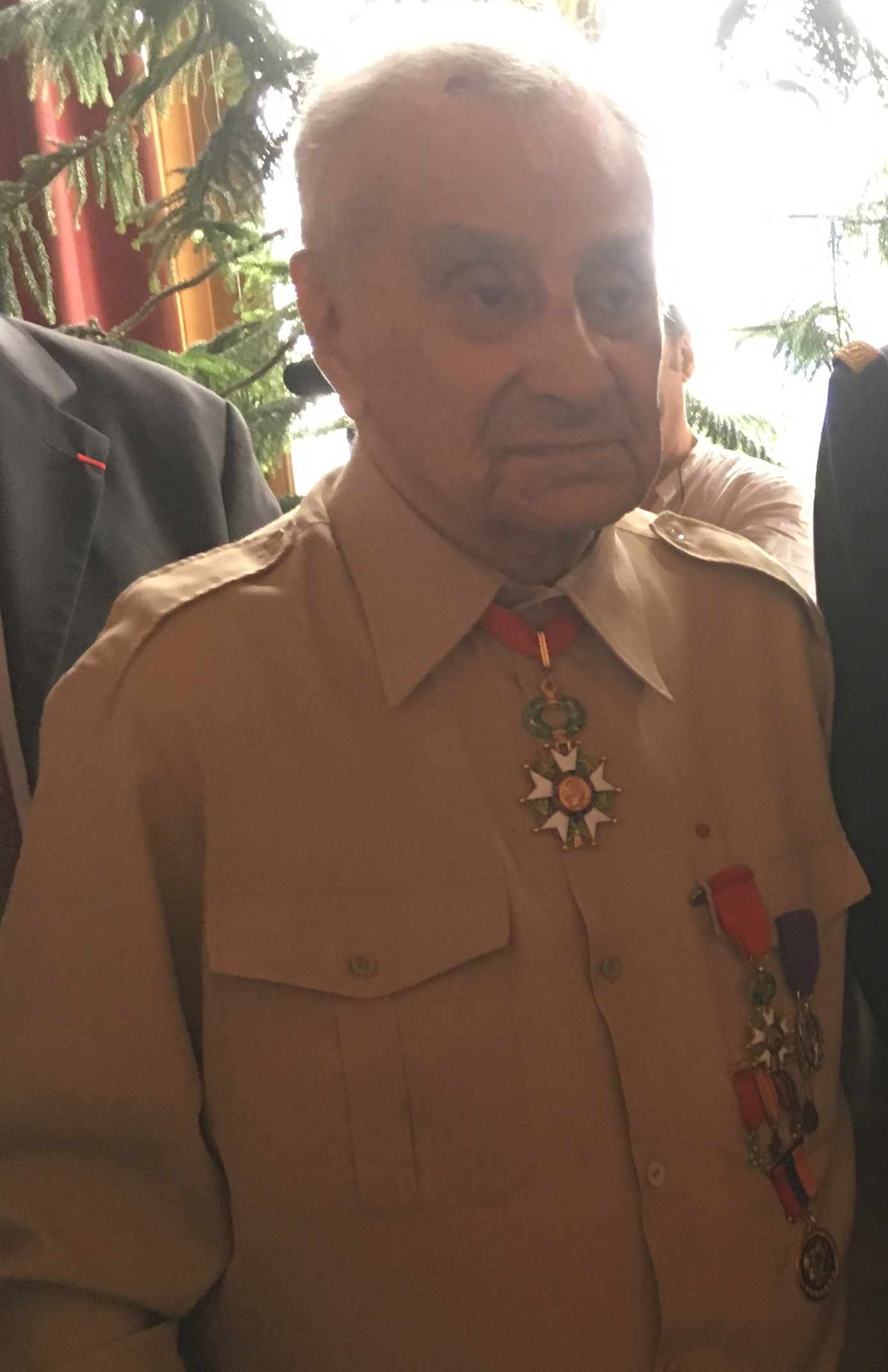
- Tchakarian at his presentation for Commander of the Legion of Honour on 22 June 2017.
- Born: 21 December 1916; Sapanca, Ottoman Empire
- Died: 4 August 2018 (aged 101); Villejuif, France
- Occupations: Historian french resistance member

Arsène Tchakarian (21 December 1916 – 4 August 2018) was a French-Armenian historian, former tailor and member of the French Resistance. He was a member of the Manouchian Group of the FTP-MOI, a wing of the larger Francs-Tireurs et Partisans (FTP) composed of fighters of foreign immigrant origin. Tchakarian was the last surviving member of the Manouchian Group (Groupe Manouchian), a Paris-based resistance cell led by Missak Manouchian.

== Biography ==
Tchakarian was born to an ethnic Armenian family in Sapanca, the Ottoman Empire (present-day Turkey) on 21 December 1916. Tchakarian arrived in France in 1930 with his family and settled permanently in the country. He worked as a tailor.

In 1937, Tchakarian was conscripted into the French Army, where he served until 1940. He was discharged from the Army in 1940 following the defeat and occupation of France by Nazi Germany. He then became active in the nascent French resistance.

=== Manouchian Group and the French Resistance ===
In 1942, Tchakarian joined the Manouchian Group, a small armed group within the larger FTP-MOI that was composed primarily of immigrant and foreign-origin resistance fighters. The group was commanded by Missak Manouchian, an ethnic Armenian communist and poet. In addition to Armenians, like himself, the Manouchian Group contained immigrants and refugees from other countries invaded by Nazi Germany, as well as Jews. According to Tchakarian, immigrants from fascist countries and those occupied by Nazi Germany were drawn to the resistance and cells like the Manouchian Group, "They were immigrants who had come from countries that were becoming fascist, like Hungary, Romania, Poland, Bulgaria...From all those countries, there were immigrants who were kind of hunted out."

Together, the Manouchian Group, which was based in the Paris region, carried out resistance attacks, assassinations, and acts of sabotage across the country. In 1944, German authorities captured 23 Manouchian members, including their leader, Missak Manouchian. The members were sentenced to death and executed following a high-profile show trial. Following their executions, German and Vichy French authorities launched a propaganda campaign against the Manouchian Group. Red posters, which became infamously known as "Affiche Rouge", were hung in Paris during the spring of 1944. The Affiche Rouge depicted the Manouchian Group and its members as "the army of crime" in a bid to turn French public opinion against the resistance.

Unlike his 23 Manouchian colleagues, Tchakarian managed to escape capture and execution in 1944. He fled to Bordeaux, where he was hidden by other French resistance members. However, he remained an active resistance member until the end of World War II in 1945.

=== Post-war ===
In 1950, Arsène Tchakarian moved to the Parisian suburb of Vitry-sur-Seine, where he lived until his death in 2018. Tchakarian was granted French citizenship in 1958.

Tchakarian became a respected historian in the decades following World War II. His writings focused on the Armenian genocide and French history. Tchakarian campaigned for the international recognition of the Armenian Genocide, from which he and his family had fled as refugees. He visited schools and universities to speak about his experiences during the genocide in the Ottoman Empire and the Nazi German occupation of France. Additionally, Tchakarian authored several memoirs.

The French newspaper Le Figaro quoted Tchakarian as saying, "I'm sort of the last of the Mohicans, as they say," as he noted that he was one of the last surviving members of the FTP-MOI and the resistance.

In 2012, French President Nicolas Sarkozy awarded him the Legion of Honor. Most recently, Tchakarian attended a ceremony in commemoration of the French Resistance on 18 June 2018.

Arsène Tchakarian, the last surviving member of the Manouchian Group, died at the Hôpital Paul-Brousse in Villejuif, France, on 4 August 2018, at the age of 101. In a Twitter post, French President Emmanuel Macron paid tribute to his time in the resistance and work as a historian, calling Tchakarian "a hero of the resistance and a tireless witness whose voice resounded with force until the end."
