= Herbert Herz =

French resistance fighter (1924–2016)

Herbert Herz (known as Georges-Hubert Charnay by false papers) (1924–2016) is a former fighter with the French Resistance in the FTP-MOI, a member of the Carmagnole and Liberté squads of the Lyon region during World War II. His Jewish family emigrated to France in 1934 to escape Nazi persecution. In 1996 he was awarded the Légion d'honneur. He wrote a memoir in 2007 to publicize the role of the many foreigners, mostly Jewish, in the armed Resistance against the Nazis in France.

== Early life and education ==
Herbert Herz was born on May 7, 1924 Augsburg in Bavaria to Simon and Meta Eichenbronner Herz; he had an older brother Emmanuel. His family spent much of his childhood there. After his father and uncle were arrested and held for three weeks in 1933 from being denounced, they decided to leave Germany quickly to escape more persecution under the rise of Nazism. They emigrated to Dijon, France in 1934 when Herbert was ten. He quickly learned the new language and studied in French schools.

== World War II ==
After the Fall of France in 1940, the Herz family evacuated to Bordeaux, where the children continued in school. His father had died in 1939. After its occupation of France, the Nazis continued their actions against the Jews and required French authorities to carry out their orders.

In 1942 the Germans ordered French authorities in the Free Zone to round up all foreign Jews for deportation to Nazi concentration camps. Although Herz was captured by the French Gendarmerie, he escaped with the aid of a professor from his school and avoided internment and deportation.

Going underground at age 18 for a year, Herz rejoined his brother Emmanuel in the South of France, but they went to Grenoble to escape police interest. That area was occupied by the Italians, who did not bother the Jews. In the summer of 1943, they joined the armed Résistance in Grenoble under the aegis of the FTP-MOI (Francs-Tireurs et Partisans – Main-d'Œuvre Immigrée). The FTP-MOI was made up mostly of foreigners, many of them Spanish, Jews from Germany and eastern Europe, and Armenians.

The FTP-MOI in many cases was trained by older fighters who had fought in Spain during its civil war and Italy. The FTP_MOI was present in all the big cities in France, taking armed actions against the Nazi occupation of France, for example, bombing the factories working for the Nazis, derailing trains carrying Wehrmacht and SS troops, bombing the Wehrmacht troops, and killing Nazi officers. The Nazis fought back with investigations, roundups, interrogation under torture of prisoners to try to break down the cells. The Germans tried to classify them as foreigners, criminals, terrorists and outsiders, as with the l'Affiche Rouge in Paris, but many of the population embraced the partisans as freedom fighters.

In 1943 Emmanuel Herz tried to make his way into Switzerland, which was neutral. Herz, his mother and sister planned to join him if he was successful. Detained at the border by the Swiss, Emmanuel was turned over to French authorities, who transported him to the intern camp of Drancy. From there he was deported to Auschwitz, where he was murdered. After Grenoble was occupied by the Germans, Herz made his way to Lyon, where he fought more with the Resistance.

In 1996 the French government awarded Herbert Herz the decoration of the Legion d'Honneur for his service.

Herz died in September 2016.

== Postwar years ==
=== Marriage and family ===
Herz married and he and his wife had three children together.

=== Career ===
After the war, Herz completed his studies in engineering. He went on to work for the Conseil Européen pour la Recherche Nucléaire (CERN) (European Council for Nuclear Research) in Geneva, Switzerland. Now called Organisation européenne pour la recherche nucléaire, it retains the original acronym. Although he has lived and worked in Switzerland for decades, Herz never became a naturalized Swiss citizen, in memory of the Swiss having turned his brother over to French authorities at the border.

Now retired, Herz lives in Ferney-Voltaire. He works as a delegate of the Yad Vashem Institute in Jerusalem to find people who risked their lives to save Jews during the Holocaust. Such people are candidates for the institute's award of "Righteous among the Nations".

In 2007, Herz published a memoir, Mon combat dans la Résistance FTP-MOI, Souvenirs d'un jeune Juif allemand (My combat in the FTP-MOI resistance, memories of a young German Jew). He wants to publicize the participation of the many foreigners in the French resistance, and highlight the armed fighting of Jews in the struggle against the Nazis and other supporters of Adolf Hitler. He also maintains a blog, where he writes on the Resistance.
