= Thomas Elek =

Thomas Elek, also known as Tamás Elek and KERPAL (7 December 1924 – 21 February 1944) was one of 22 members of the French Resistance convicted and executed at the fort of Mont Valérien as one of the Manouchian Group, part of the French liberation army FTP-MOI. After the executions, the Vichy government sought to discredit the resistance members, and widely distributed and posted thousands of copies of the Affiche Rouge. Named for its red background, the poster featured ten of the Manouchian group, including Elek. It identified him as "Elek Juif Hongrois 8 déraillements" (Elek, Hungarian Jew, 8 derailments).

Elek had immigrated as a child with his family from Hungary to France in 1930, when they settled in Paris. After France fell to Nazi Germany in 1940 and enemy forces occupied Paris, he dropped out of the lycée and became involved in underground resistance movements. He was credited with armed attacks on German soldiers, including a train derailment in July 1943 that resulted in the death of 600 men.

== Biography ==
=== Early years ===
Thomas Elek was born in Budapest, Hungary on 7 December 1924 to a family of communist intellectuals. The Elek family (Thomas, his father Sandor, his sister Marthe and his mother Hélène, then pregnant with his brother, Bela) emigrated to France in 1930. They settled in Paris, where his mother, after various minor jobs, became a restaurateur in 1934.

=== Second World War ===
Elek left the Lycée Louis-le-Grand at the age of 16, to become involved in the underground movement after Nazi German forces defeated France and occupied Paris. He joined a group of students at the Sorbonne who were linked to the Groupe du musée de l'Homme, wrote and distributed tracts, and stuck papillons (butterflies – flyers) to walls. In August 1942, sympathising with the Jeunesses Communistes (Communist Youth), he became involved with the FTP-MOI (Francs-tireurs et partisans – Main-d'œuvre immigrée) and took up the armed struggle of resistance. His nom de guerre was KERPAL.

Shortly after, Elek was assigned a solo attack on the Rive Gauche German bookstore, in which he used a booby-trapped copy of Marx's Capital. In March 1943, along with the young Czech, Pavel Simo, he made a grenade attack on a restaurant reserved for German officers at Asnières. Simo was arrested, and executed on 22 May 1943 at the Stand de tir de Balard.

On 1 June 1943 in a spontaneous attack, Elek threw two grenades into a group of 70 Germans in front of the Jaurès metro station. He was promoted and named head of the group at the center of the 4th detachment of the FTP-MOI Paris region; they were known as des dérailleurs and commanded by Joseph Boczov.

Elek participated in several railway derailments, notably that of 28 July on the Paris-Château-Thierry line. This derailment is said to have caused the death of 600 German soldiers.

In 1943 Elek was arrested with others of the Manouchian Group and tortured by the Vichy Brigades Spéciales. He was transferred to the Germans and detained in Fresnes Prison. All but the sole woman member of the Manouchian group were condemned to death in a show trial by military officers, and executed by firing squad three days later, 21 February 1944, at Mont Valérien. The woman was beheaded at another site.

== Legacy ==
- Rather than acting as a deterrent, the Affiche Rouge inspired citizens to more actions with the Résistance. Residents wrote Morts pour La France (Died for France) across the posters of the Manouchian group.
- Elek is portrayed by actor Grégoire Leprince-Ringuet in the 2009 French film The Army of Crime, directed by Robert Guédiguian.

== See also ==
- Francs-tireurs et partisans - Main-d'œuvre immigrée
- Affiche rouge
- Brigades Spéciales
- Geheime Feld Polizei

== Bibliography ==
- FFI – FTPF, Pages de gloire des vingt-trois, Immigration, 1951.
- La Mémoire d'Hélène (autobiographie d'Hélène Elek), éd François Maspéro, 1977
- Les Jeunes et la Résistance, dir. Laurence Thibault, AERI/La Documentation Française, 2007
- L'Affiche rouge, Adam Rayski, Mairie de Paris, 2003
- La Résistance en Ile-de-France, DVD-Rom, AERI, 2004
- Le Sang de l'étranger – Les immigrés de la M.O.I. dans la Résistance, S. Courtois, D. Peschanski, A. Rayski, Fayard: 1989
