= Franz Stock =

Catholic priest, wartime chaplain and peace activist

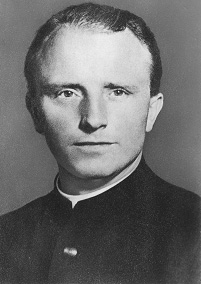
The Servant of God Franz Stock

Franz Stock (21 September 1904, Neheim – 24 February 1948, Paris) was a German Roman Catholic priest. He is known for ministering to prisoners in France during World War II, and to German prisoners of war in the years following. The cause for his beatification has been accepted by the Holy See.

== Early life ==
Stock was born the first of nine children of a worker family in the village of Neheim-Hüsten (now part of Arnsberg), in the Province of Westphalia of the German Empire. From 1910 to 1913, he attended a Catholic elementary school. At the age of twelve Franz expressed a wish to become a priest. In 1926, he participated in an international peace meeting in Bierville near Paris, which was organized by Marc Sangnier under the motto "Peace via the young!" There Franz became friends with Joseph Folliet (1902–1973), who grew up to become a noted Catholic writer and who greatly influenced him. That same year, he entered the Catholic seminary in Paderborn.

In the spring of 1928, Stock went to Paris, France, where he spent three semesters studying at the Institut Catholique. During this period, he became a member of the Compagnons du saint François (Companions of St. Francis), a fellowship committed to living a simple life and working for peace. He was the first German student of theology in France since the Middle Ages.

Stock was ordained to the subdiaconate on 15 March 1931. He was ordained to the priesthood on 12 March 1932 by the Archbishop of Paderborn, Kaspar Klein, and from 1932 to 1934 had his first appointment as priest in Effeln, near Lippstadt, and in Dortmund-Eving. In 1934, he was appointed as rector of the German national parish of St. Boniface in Paris.

== World War II ==
A few days before the outbreak of World War II on 1 September 1939, he returned to Germany, where he officiated as a priest in Dortmund-Bodelschwingh and in Klein-Wanzleben in central Germany. On 13 August 1940, he was named as priest for Germans residing in Paris during Nazi Germany's occupation of France, and returned in October 1940 to Paris. In 1941, he started to work as a chaplain in the Fresnes Prison, La Santé Prison and Cherche-Midi Prison in Paris. He was also a chaplain at the execution site at the Mont Valérien during the German occupation of France in World War II, owing him his nickname L'Aumônier de l'Enfer (The chaplain of Hell) and L'archange des prisons (The archangel of the prisons). Often, because of his German nationality, he was the only priest who could freely visit the prisoners without being a part of the Nazi war apparatus. He then met with more than 2,000 prisoners, including the French Navy officer Henri Honoré d'Estienne d'Orves, the Communist Gabriel Péri and the Gaullist Edmond Michelet. As part of his pastoral mission, and with great peril to his life, he passed messages from the prisoners to their families and back, sometimes memorizing them. Exploiting every possible avenue to help the prisoners, he delivered German information on them to their families, so as to prepare them when interrogated. The information thus delivered prevented many arrests. This he did under a double threat to his life: besides the obvious peril of arrest, incarceration and/or execution if discovered, Stock suffered severe heart disease (a fact he kept from others) and thus had been ordered to rest. Nevertheless, he went on in his endeavor.

On 10 June 1941, he was officially acknowledged as military chaplain with the rank of non-commissioned officer. At the time of the liberation of Paris on 25 August 1944, Stock was in the Pitié-Salpêtrière Hospital, where more than 600 wounded German soldiers together with 200 British and American soldiers were lying, unfit for transport. When the Americans took command of the hospital, Stock became a prisoner of war of the Americans, and was sent to the POW camp of Cherbourg. This he accepted willingly, for it enabled him to help those who now needed most his services – the defeated German POWs. The Aumônerie Générale in Paris, planning to set up a seminary for captured German Catholic students of theology at the POW Camp Depot 51 at Orléans, contacted him. Shortly thereafter, Stock was asked to head this seminary as managing director, supported in particular by the Gaullist Edmond Michelet.

On 24 April 1945, the Abbé Le Meur accompanied him to Orléans, where already twenty-eight theology students awaited them. On 17 August 1945, the "barbed-wire seminary", the séminaire des barbelés, was transferred from Orléans to Camp 501 at Le Coudray, near Chartres. On 19 August 1945, Raoul-Octove-Marie-Jean Harscouët, Bishop of Chartres, accompanied by his secretary Abbé Pierre André, visited the POW seminary. Later, he visited the camp repeatedly and addressed the seminarians, always calling them "Mes chers enfants (My dear children). On 18 September 1945, Nuncio Roncalli (future Pope John XXIII), came for a longer visit at the camp and returned on 16 July 1946, declaring:

The seminary of Chartres is praiseworthy for both countries, France as well as Germany. It is very suitable for becoming a sign of understanding and reconciliation.

== Post-war and death ==
From 1945 till 1947, Stock was managing director of the prisoner of war séminaire des barbelés of Chartres. On 14 May 1947, Cardinal Suhard of Paris visited the seminary, which was closed on 5 June 1947. 949 lecturers, priests, brothers and seminarists had been at the seminary. When it was closed, only 369 were still there.

On 16 December 1947, Stock received notification about his appointment as honorary doctor of the University of Freiburg, in Freiburg im Breisgau, Germany. He died unexpectedly on 24 February 1948 at the Hôpital Cochin in Paris. Since he was still considered a POW, very few people were made aware of his death at the time. His funeral was held four days later, at the Saint-Jacques-du-Haut-Pas church in Paris, with Nuncio Roncalli officiating. Only about 12 people accompanied his body to the cemetery of Thiais in Paris.

== Legacy ==
On 15/16 June 1963 his body was transferred to the newly built Church of Saint-Jean-Baptiste in Chartres. On 18 November 1981, in Fulda, during his visit to Germany, Pope John Paul II mentioned the name of Franz Stock along with the names of great saints of German history. The esplanade in front of the Mémorial de la France combattante has been named the Place Abbé Franz Stock in memory of the care he gave to the condemned prisoners while they were held in Fort Mont Valérien.

On 1 March 1998, the commemoration of the 50th anniversary of his death was held in the Chartres Cathedral. The archbishop of Paris, Cardinal Jean-Marie Lustiger, celebrated Pontifical High Mass in the presence of many French and German bishops, and of René Monory, President of the French Senate and of Helmut Kohl, Chancellor of the Federal Republic of Germany, who, beforehand, had laid down a wreath on Stock's grave.

== Cause for canonization ==
There is an ongoing effort to have Franz Stock declared to be a saint. One miracle, usually a permanent and total medically unexplainable cure clearly and directly attributable to his intercession (as judged by a panel of neutral doctors and medical experts, and by another panel of lay and clerical philosophers and theologians, who give their opinion to the Congregation for the Causes of Saints, to be further considered, and forwarded to the Pope), is needed for him to be beatified, and a subsequent second such miracle for his canonization as a Saint. Before he can be beatified, the Church must declare that he lived a holy and virtuous life (a Servant of God), and that he lived it heroically and publicly in a manner worthy of respect and universal veneration (be Venerable).

=== Commencement of the process ===
On 14 November 2009 the proceedings for Stock's beatification were opened in the Church St. John the Baptist in Arnsberg-Neheim, his birthplace. He was baptized in this church and celebrated his first Mass there. Many members of the congregation and many of his former companions took part in the service. The ceremony was presided over by the former archbishop of Paderborn, Hans-Joseph Becker. With this step, Stock could be referred to as a Servant of God within the Catholic Church.

== Quotes ==
- "Abbé Franz Stock – that is no name, it is a program!" Nuncio Angelo Roncalli, who became later Pope John XXIII, said this on 28 February 1948, when carrying out the blessing of the deceased priest. In July 1962, he repeated these words in front of an international pilgrim group.

...the priest Franz Stock, we said so on the day of his funeral, when bestowing absolutio ad tumbam – this is not only a name – it is a program. Now after fourteen years have passed, we do wish to repeat the very same words.

- Joseph Folliet said about him:

There are, I believe, only a few Christian life stories which have given to the Catholicism of the church and peace of Christ such a direct and lasting effect and rendered such a surviving testimony for the future, like the one of Franz Stock.
