= André Pican =

André Pican (19 October 1901 – 23 May 1942) was a French Communist, resistance fighter, and victim of National Socialism.

== Early life ==
André Pican was born in 1901 in the town of Sotteville-lès-Rouen. His parents were Eugène Pican, an administrative employee, and Marie Juliette Larrue, a teacher. In 1917, he entered the École Normale d'instituteurs de Rouen where he met Germaine Morigot, whom he married on 24 September 1923 in Malaunay, Seine-Maritime.

== Role in the Resistance ==
Raised in modest circumstances, he joined the French Communist Party in 1934. During the German occupation of France during World War II, Pican joined the French Resistance. Operating in the Seine-Inférieure region (now Seine-Maritime), he distributed anti-fascist literature and participated in resistance activities aimed at undermining the Nazi regime. These efforts eventually led to his arrest by the Gestapo.

== Arrest and Execution ==
On February 15, 1942, after being followed for ten days by eleven police inspectors from the BS1 (Brigade Spéciale 1), he was arrested. Initially imprisoned at the Dépôt on Quai de l’Horloge, he was later transferred to the Santé prison. During the transfer, he managed to escape from his guards, but his flight ended as he plunged, freezing, into the Seine. Tortured and having attempted another unsuccessful escape, he was executed as a hostage on May 23, 1942 by firing squad at Mont Valérien, a notorious execution site for resistance fighters during the German occupation.

== Legacy ==
André Pican is commemorated in both France and Germany as a symbol of resistance against National Socialism. In Oranienburg, near Berlin, the André-Pican-Straße is named after him, serving as a tribute to his sacrifice and a reminder of the atrocities committed during World War II, particularly in the nearby Sachsenhausen concentration camp.
