= Alexandru Jar =

Romanian poet and prose writer

Alexandru Jar (Romanian pronunciation: [alekˈsandru ˈʒar]; pen name of Alexandru Avram [aˈvram]; November 20, 1911 – November 10, 1988) was a Romanian poet and prose writer.

Born into a Jewish family in Iași, his parents were Iacob Avram and his wife Șura Bella; he was self-taught. He married the revolutionary Olga Bancic, and the couple began life together as members of the banned Romanian Communist Party, alternately entering and escaping prison. They went into exile in France, where in 1939 Olga gave birth to a daughter, Dolores. After the surrender of Paris during the World War II Battle of France, Jar entered the French Resistance, while his wife was captured by the Nazis and beheaded. He returned to Romania in 1943. Jar recalled his wartime experience in the poems of the 1945 collection Sânge și vis ('Blood and dream') and in the 1948 short story book Interogatoriu.

After the Coup of 1944 against Romania's pro-Axis dictator, he occupied various administrative positions in what would soon become the Romanian Writers' Union. He made his literary debut in 1930 in Bluze albastre magazine. Other publications that ran his work include Cuvântul liber, Șantier, Vremea, Tinerețea and Flacăra. Following two further poetry volumes that appeared in 1946 (Poemul marii deșteptări and Fragment de veac), he worked on prose. Jar turned out a large number of novels (Evadare, 1949; Sfârșitul jalbelor, 1950; La borna 202, 1951; Marea pregătire, 1952; Undeva pe Dunăre, 1952; O poveste simplă, 1955; Lagard cel însemnat, 1966; Trădarea lunii, 1968; Eu, Consula!, 1971), as well as a few short story volumes, such as Tehnicul și-a făcut datoria (1951) and Nasul și fericirea lumii (1976). He was barred from publishing between 1956 and 1966, due to a less rigid approach he had taken that set off vehement criticism and "unmasking". He was awarded the State Prize in 1950 and the Order of Tudor Vladimirescu, 2nd class in 1971.
