= Boris Milev =

Bulgarian journalist and participant in the French Resistance

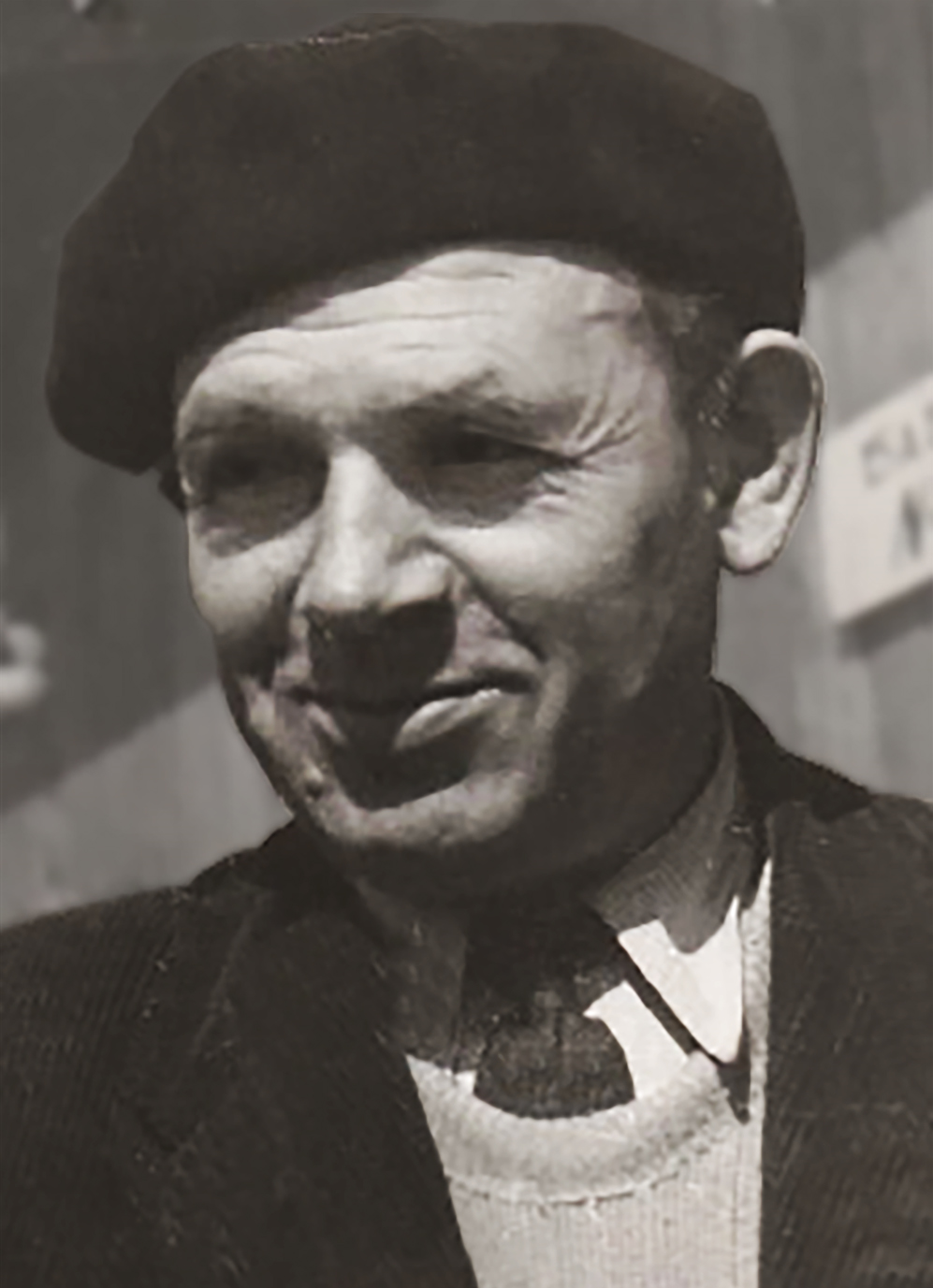
Boris Milev in 1960

Boris Milev (June 29, 1903 in Sofia – April 28, 1983 in Sofia) was a Bulgarian communist who worked in theater, cinema and journalism. He is known for his role in the French Resistance as the political director of the FTP-MOI partisans, located in the Paris region, during World War II.

== Early life ==
Milev was born in Sofia to a poor family with five children. He was raised by his mother and grandmother. In his youth, he became politically active in left-wing politics. He received first place in the national theater competition in 1922, he then began a theatrical career. he was arrested, then released, before he became a teacher in the village of Kapatovo in Petrich in the south of Bulgaria. In 1925, he joined the Bulgarian Communist Party, to escape reprisals, then emigrated to Paris in the same year. He worked there as a sandal braider, then became Charles Dullin’s assistant at the Atelier theatre. Caught up in the consequences of a strike, he was deported to Belgium in 1928. As an activist in the Communist Party of Belgium, he spent time in Saint-Gilles prison. After being expelled from Belgium, he returned to France in 1929, where he resumed his work as a sandal braider. In 1931, he returned to Bulgaria where he continued his political and literary activities with the newspapers Echo, and RLF; and magazines Anvil, Theatre among others. In 1932, he became a permanent member of the Bulgarian Communist Party. He was wounded during his arrest in 1935 for which he was tried and sentenced. A few months later, he escaped from the Sofia central prison. He managed to return to France as a clandestine in 1936. He was then sent on a mission to Poland under the direction of the future General Ivan Vinarov, who collaborated with the secret services abroad of the Soviet Union. He later had to leave Poland for France in a hurry to avoid being arrested.

== Beginning of the war ==
At the end of 1939, as an "unwanted" foreigner, he was interned in Fresnes Prison, then moved to the Vernet camp, then in the Milles camp, from which he escaped. Arrested later by the Germans, he was sent to the Chalon-sur-Saône prison but was soon released when Bulgaria became an ally of the Nazis in 1941. Milev then returned to Paris and joined a sandal-making cooperative with some compatriots. This serves as a cover for his activities against the Nazi occupiers from July 1942. The Bulgarian team in Paris was made up of Vladimir Chterbanov, Nikolai Radulov, Georgi Radulov, Dimitar Gentchev - Bateto, Nikolai Zadgorsky and Nicolas Marinov. The group is part of the Combatants and partisans - Migrant Workforce (FTP-MOI Franc-tireurs et partisans - Main-d'oeuvre immigrée) and received its orders from its military chief Boris Holban.

== Political director in the French Resistance ==
In January 1943, Jacques Kaminski transmitted to Milev the decision of the central committee of the French communist party (PCF) to make him permanent staff and to include him in the tri-partite direction of the FTP-MOI of the Paris region as their political leader. His superiors would be Henri Rol-Tanguy (Yves) and Robert Ballanger (Lapierre). Numerous actions were then launched against the Nazi occupiers. Their job was to coordinate the fighting groups and their actions, to recruit new combatants, to convince them of the merits of the armed struggle, sometimes to test them, and to reinforce their fighting spirit. One of their recruitments is that of Missak Manouchian (Georges), who would later be at the heart of the Affiche Rouge (Red Poster). Understanding that he was being followed by the police, Milev was sent in May 1943 to the north and east of France. In November 1943, Louis Gronowski (Brunot) announced to him that the central committee of the PCF had appointed him as the political leader of the FTP-MOI. With the help of the FTP in the field, Soviet prisoners escaped and entered the clandestine resistance.

== After the war ==
Milev took part in the uprising in Paris in August 1944. On August 21, his group took control of the Bulgarian legation. At the end of the war, Milev, with a group of ten compatriots, returned to Bulgaria. In 1945, he became editor-in-chief of the weekly Знаме на труда (Labor Flag). He founded with Nicolas Aleksiev the daily Труд (Work) on September 15, 1946. As a victim of the Stalinist trials in 1951, he served 6 months in prison and was then be rehabilitated. Between 1950 and 1958, he was Director of the Documentary Films Studio (Студията за хроникални и документални филми) He was Bulgaria's ambassador to UNESCO from 1958 to 1963 in Paris, and then ambassador to Guinea and Sierra Leone from 1968 until 1971. He died in Sofia in 1983.

== Books ==
- Boris Milev, The trade union movement in France, ORPS, 1946, 40 p.
- Boris Milev-Ogin, Pages, memories, State Military Publishing House, 1973, 432 p.
- Boris Milev-Ogin, Mihail Berberov, Anton, Living legend, Homeland Publishing House, 1981, 116 p.
- Boris Milev-Ogin, Pages, Party Edition, 1982, 487 p.; in Bulgarian free access; in French free access
- Boris Milev-Ogin, Paris is hungry, Paris is cold, but no longer ashamed, The Paris uprising, August 1944, Fatherland Front, 1984, 185 p.
- Boris Holban, Testament (testament), Calmann-Lévy, Paris, 1989, 324 p. ISBN 978-2-7021-1778-1
- Stéphane Courtois, Denis Peschanski, Adam Rayski, Le sang de l’étranger (The blood of the foreigner), Fayard, 1989, 470p., ISBN 2-213-01889-8
- Louis Gronowski-Brunot, Le dernier grand soir. Un Juif de Pologne (The last big night. A Jew from Poland), Le Seuil, 1980, 288p., ISBN 2-02-005683-6
- Gaston Laroche, On les nommait des étrangers, Les immigrés dans la Résistance (They were called foreigners, Immigrants in the Resistance), 1965, Les Éditeurs Français Réunis, 477 p.
- Roger Bourderon, Rol-Tanguy, Des brigades internationales à la libération de Paris (From international brigades to the liberation of Paris), 2013, Tallandier, 768 p., ISBN 979-10-210-0156-5
- Colonel Rol-Tanguy, Roger Bourderon, Libération de Paris, Les cent documents (Liberation of Paris, The Hundred Documents), Hachette, 1994, 330p., ISBN 978-2012-787049

== Documentary films (selection) ==
- An inspiring example, 1950
- The Apostle of Liberty, 1955
- The Arda song, with Aleksandar Roupchin, 1957
- Our capital, with Aleksandar Roupchin, 1958
- Combat groups, with Aleksandar Roupchin, 1974

== Awards ==
- Croix du combattant (N° 759514 - 1974)
