= Pole of Communist Revival in France =

Pole of Communist Revival in France Pôle de renaissance communiste en France
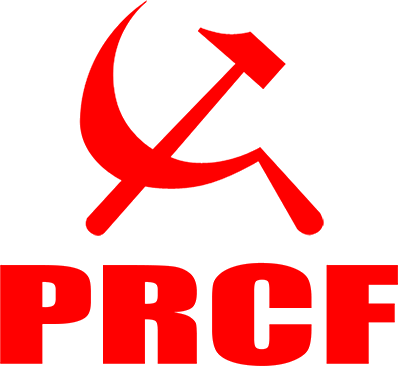
- Founded: 2004
- Split from: PCF
- Newspaper: Initiative communiste
- Youth wing: Jeunes pour la renaissance communiste en France (JRCF)
- Ideology: Communism; Marxism–Leninism; Internationalism; Hard Euroscepticism
- Political position: Far-left
- European affiliation: INITIATIVE (defunct)
- International affiliation: World Anti-Imperialist Platform; ICS (defunct)

Website
- www.initiative-communiste.fr

The Pole of Communist Revival in France (French: Pôle de renaissance communiste en France, PRCF) is a French political party founded in January 2004. It was an internal tendency of the French Communist Party (PCF) that left the party, rejecting the PCF's "mutation" beginning in the early 1990s.

== Organisation ==
The president-delegate of the PRCF was Léon Landini, the president of the National Political Committee (CPN) is Jean-Pierre Hemmen, the national, directing political spokesman of Communist Initiative is Georges Gastaud, and Georges Hage, a former member of parliament for the Nord departement and senior of the National Assembly, is the honorary president.

The PRCF is organized in associations in the French départements, sections and cells (democratic centralism). It is based on the theory of scientific socialism of Karl Marx, Friedrich Engels, Vladimir Lenin and other revolutionary thinkers. The PRCF publishes the Initiative communiste (Communist Initiative) monthly magazine and the theoretical review EtincelleS. Historically, PRCF activists hosted the weekly programme Convergence on Radio Galère in Marseille.

Until late 2025, the PRCF's youth organisation was the Young People for Communist Revival in France (JRCF). In August 2024, around thirty JRCF members attending the organisation's summer camp held a demonstration in Montauban, where its representatives advocated France's withdrawal from the European Union, NATO and the euro, as well as the abolition of capitalism. In late 2025, a conflict between the leaderships of the PRCF and JRCF resulted in a split. The PRCF accused the JRCF leadership of having organised a faction against it, while former PRCF members involved in the dispute stated that they had been expelled from the organisation. They subsequently established the Organisation Communiste de France (OCF) in early 2026.

== Electoral participation ==
As it does not wish to participate in "supranational" elections, the PRCF calls for a boycott of European Parliament elections in France, advocating what it terms "citizens' abstention". In 2005, it called for a "No" vote in the 2005 French European Constitution referendum.

In 2007, the PRCF called for a vote for Gérard Schivardi, the candidate of the Independent Workers' Party, in the presidential election, and fielded several candidates in the legislative elections, including in the 1st, 2nd and 3rd constituencies of Corrèze, the 12th constituency of Pas-de-Calais, and the 2nd constituency of Val-de-Marne.

In 2012, it fielded candidates in three constituencies in the 2012 French legislative election.

In 2014, the PRCF fielded several candidates in the 2014 French municipal elections, including on two joint lists in Passy (Haute-Savoie) and Lens (Pas-de-Calais).

In the first round of the 2017 French presidential election, the PRCF called for a vote for Jean-Luc Mélenchon of La France Insoumise (LFI). During the subsequent 2017 French legislative election, PRCF activists distributed campaign literature alongside LFI activists.

In 2021, the PRCF selected Fadi Kassem as its prospective candidate for the 2022 French presidential election, campaigning in favour of sovereigntism and what it described as a "progressive Frexit", but Kassem failed to obtain the 500 elected-official sponsorships required to stand in the election.

In 2024, the PRCF fielded three candidates in the 2024 French legislative election: in Ille-et-Vilaine's 6th constituency, Seine-Saint-Denis's 7th constituency, and Val-de-Marne's 2nd constituency. The PRCF obtained its best result in the latter constituency, receiving 0.71% of the vote in the first round.
