= Georges Cloarec =

French resistance fighter (1923–1944)

- Born: 22 December 1923; Saint-Lubin-des-Joncherets
- Died: 21 February 1944 (aged 20); Fort Mont-Valérien
- Occupation: Resistance fighter
- Political party: French Communist Party

Georges Cloarec (22 December 1923, in Saint-Rémy-sur-Avre – 21 February 1944, in mont Valérien) was a fighter in the French resistance, a volunteer in the FTP-MOI liberation army in the Manouchian group.

== Biography ==
Cloarec began as an agricultural worker at the age of 15. When the Second World War started, he was enthused with patriotic feelings which strengthened with time. When the Germans occupied Paris and the north part of France, he left his job and travelled secretly to the southern zone, with the intention of reaching England and fighting with the Free French forces. The recruiters decided that he was too young, and rejected him.

Around the beginning of 1942, he joined the French Fleet at Toulon, intending to serve France. One day he decided along with some of his comrades that the orders given by their superiors were not aligned to France's interests. He revolted and shouted "Long live France! Down with collaboration!". He was immediately imprisoned. On his release, he returned to spend several months with his parents. He then travelled to Paris to make contact with the resistance. Soon he found himself among comrades who were immigrants. He participated in several operations.

Arrested in the month of November 1943, he was handed over with all his comrades-at-arms to the German military court. Sentenced to death, he was executed by firearm at the fort of Mont Valérien on 21 February 1944 among his comrades.

== See also ==
- Francs-tireurs et partisans - Main-d'œuvre immigrée
- Affiche rouge
- French Resistance
