= Honoré d'Estienne d'Orves =

French Navy officer and French Resistance hero

Henri Louis Honoré, comte d'Estienne d'Orves (French pronunciation: [ɑ̃ʁi ɔnɔʁe dɛstjɛn dɔʁv]; 5 June 1901 – 29 August 1941) was a French Navy officer and one of the major heroes of the French Resistance, said to be the "first martyr of Free France".

== Early life ==
He was born in Verrières-le-Buisson (now in the Essonne department). Educated in a conservative Catholic family, he was a remote cousin of writers Antoine de Saint-Exupéry and Louise de Vilmorin, later companion of André Malraux.

Estienne d'Orves spent the First World War as a high school student at the prestigious Lycée Louis-le-Grand and the Lycée Saint-Louis-de-Gonzague in Paris, and entered the École Polytechnique in 1921.

He enrolled in the École Navale (French Naval Academy), becoming an enseigne de vaisseau de 2e classe in October 1923 and joining the school ship Jeanne d'Arc. He was then an officer on the battleship Provence, and several other vessels. In 1929, he married Éliane de Lorgeril, with whom he had five children. In 1930, he was promoted to lieutenant de vaisseau, and was made a chevalier de la Légion d'honneur in 1935. In December 1936, he joined the Naval War School for one year. When World War II broke out in 1939, he was serving aboard the Jaguar, as under-chief of the headquarters of the 2nd flotilla of torpedo boats in Mediterranean Sea. In December 1939, he was an aide to Admiral René-Émile Godfroy in the headquarters of "Force X" aboard the cruiser Duquesne.

On 25 June 1940, the day the Armistice was signed, he was in Alexandria, Egypt. Politically, d'Estienne d'Orves belonged to the right wing, and sympathized with Charles Maurras and Catholic monarchism; nonetheless, while many far-right wing theoricians welcomed the arrival of Marshal Philippe Pétain, the strongly patriotic d'Estienne d'Orves was unwilling to accept France's defeat. He attempted to join General Paul Legentilhomme, commander of French troops on the coast of French Somaliland, who had announced his intention to reject the armistice, but the colony chose to support the Vichy régime. D'Estienne d'Orves then gathered a group of volunteer sailors and officers, took the nom de guerre "Châteauvieux" (name of one of his ancestors) and contacted the Free France authorities. He set sail on a cargo ship from Aden to London, sailing around Africa for two months, and joined General de Gaulle in London on 27 September 1940.

He met with Admiral Émile Muselier, but was unable to obtain a command at sea. Promoted to capitaine de corvette (lieutenant commander) on 1 October 1940, he joined the Second Office of the Free French Naval Forces and requested to be sent to occupied France. After having convinced General de Gaulle, on 15 December 1940 he was given the mission to organise an intelligence network in western France, codenamed Nemrod, which had been created in September 1940 by Maurice Barlier and Jan Doornik, but lacked coordination and development.

== Role in Occupied France ==
D'Estienne d'Orves was codenamed "Jean-Pierre Girard". On 21 December 1940, he set sail from Newlyn to Plogoff in Brittany on a fishing boat, the Marie-Louise, along with his 20-year-old radio operator Alfred Gaessler, a German-speaking Alsatian, codenamed "Georges Marty". They arrived at the Pointe du Raz the following day.

He set his quarters in Chantenay-sur-Loire, near Nantes, at the house of M. and Mme Clément, and made several trips to Paris and in Brittany, with the notable assistance of Maurice Barlier. He set up the basic organisation of the spying web, and was able to transmit significant information about German forces (coastal defences, submarines, aerodromes and refueling point near Nantes).

From 6 January to 19 January 1941, he was in Paris to set up a second network, meeting with Max André, Jan Doornik and numerous other members of the French Resistance. Back in Nantes on 20 January, he came back to the Cléments who reported to him suspicious activities by the radio operator Gaessler, seen hanging around in bars and talking with German soldiers. When interrogated, Gaessler said that this was a good way to gather information. D'Estienne d'Orves decided to lay down Gaessler at the next trip to London but, two days later, the Gestapo stormed the house and arrested him. After a brief resistance, a wounded and handcuffed d'Estienne d'Orves was brought to Angers, along with his companions.

Gaessler's treason allowed the Nazis to also arrest Barlier, Doornik and most of the network, totaling 26 persons. The small intelligence network created by Max André, however, was untouched, and continued its operations until the Liberation of Paris in August 1944. For several weeks, Gaessler sent false information to London and allowed the Nazis to arrest several other agents. He was evacuated by the Nazis to Austria, and disappeared in 1945.

== Trial and death ==
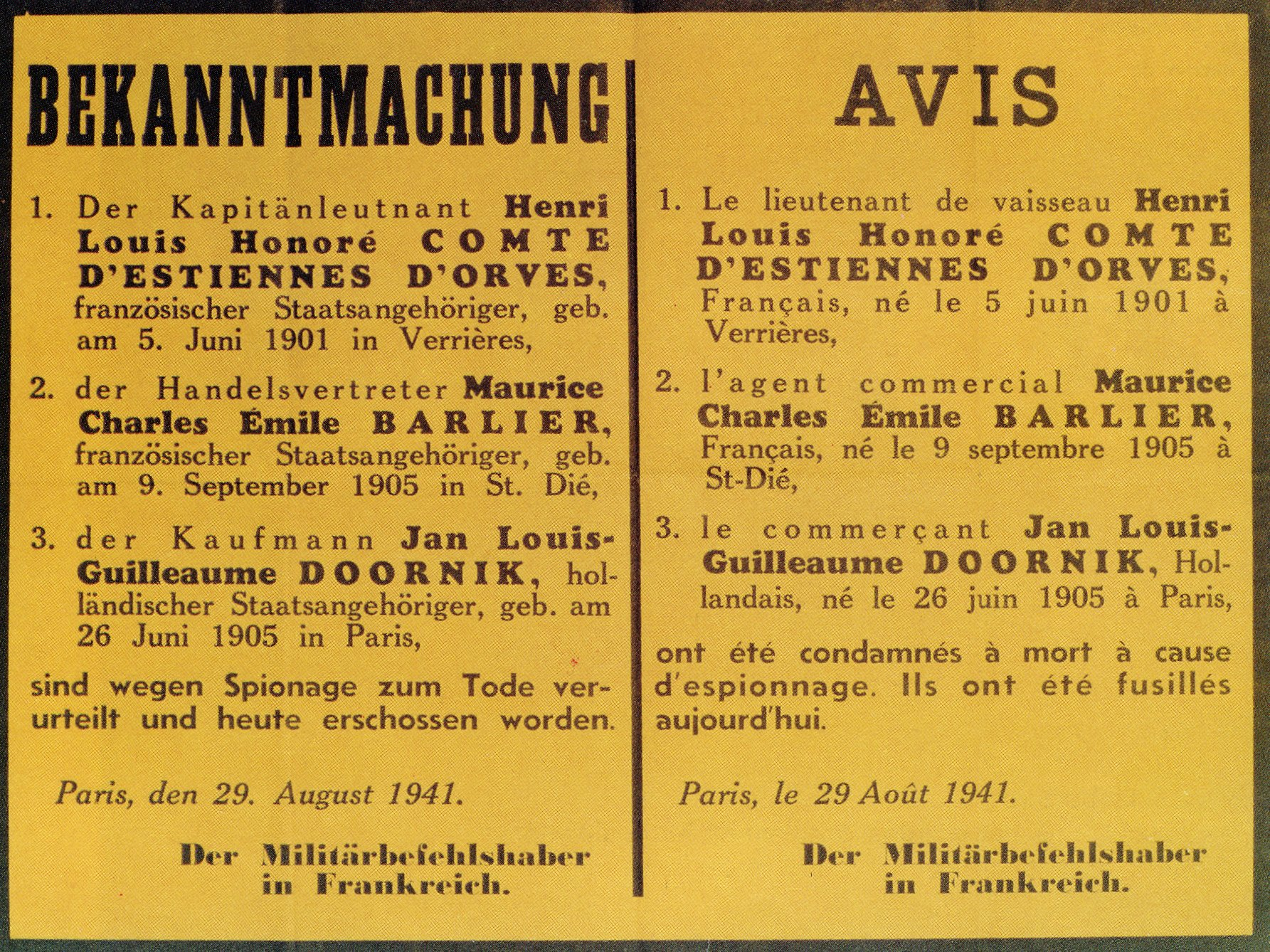
Proclamation of the execution of d'Estienne d'Orves and his companions, - Maurice Barlier and Jan Doornik by the occupier

On 24 January, the prisoners were sent to Berlin, then brought back to Paris, to the Cherche-Midi Prison. D'Estienne d'Orves was treated especially harshly, yet managed to cheer up his fellow prisoners; the moral strength which he would find in his faith would later be testified to by German chaplain Franz Stock.

His trial began on 13 May. D'Estienne d'Orves claimed full responsibility of the network, defending his fellow prisoners. On the 23rd, a German court martial sentenced him to death, along with eight of his companions, and transferred them to the Fresnes Prison.

Acknowledging their patriotism, the court martial filed a request for grace immediately, and German legal advisor Keyser took it upon himself to make the trip to Berlin and request a grace for the prisoners from Hitler himself. However, the invasion of USSR by the Third Reich, on 22 June 1941, forced the French Communists to join the Resistance and greatly increased the attacks against German forces, inducing a harshening of the repression. Hence, on 28 August, the execution order was given for d'Estienne d'Orves, Barlier and Doornik. The three condemned were granted to spend their last night together, and to be shot standing and without a blindfold. They were blessed by Chaplain Franz Stock.

D'Estienne d'Orves had an interview with president Keyser, the German military judge who had sentenced him to death, where he said: "Sir, you are a German officer. I am a French officer. We both did our duty. Please allow me to embrace you".

The execution took place on 29 August 1941 at dawn at the Fort du Mont Valérien. Honoré d'Estienne d'Orves was buried in Verrières-le-Buisson.

A German poster advertised their deaths. A number of people joined the Resistance as a consequence of this execution.

The Capitaine de corvette d'Estienne d'Orves was later posthumously promoted to Capitaine de frégate (Commander) and made a Compagnon de la Libération ("Fellow of the Liberation").

== Honours and awards ==
- Chevalier de la Légion d'honneur
- Compagnon de la Libération by decree of 30 October 1944
- Officer of Ouissam Alaouite
- Officer of the Romanian Pour la couronne order
- Officer of the Bulgarian Military Merit
- Knight of the Chinese order of the Precious Brilliant Golden Grain
- Two ships of the French Navy have been named in his honour:
  - A Flower-class corvette, launched in 1942, and which fought in the French Naval Forces: Commandant d'Estienne d'Orves
  - The lead ship of the A69 type aviso F781 D'Estienne d'Orves
- A square in the 9th arrondissement of Paris, Place d’Estienne d'Orves, is named after him, which in turn gives his name to a station of the Paris Métro Line 12,: Trinité-d'Estienne d'Orves
- A high-school in Nice is named after him: Lycée Honoré d'Estienne d'Orves as well as an adjacent 15-hectare park.
- The Scouts et Guides de France Sea Scout group of Vannes (Brittany) is named after him.
