= Joseph Boczov =

Hungarian-French resistance member

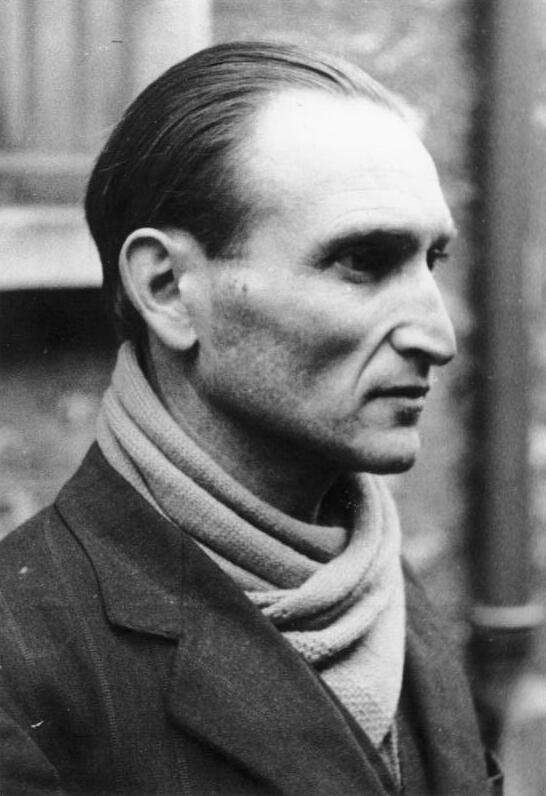
- Portrait preserved in the German Federal Archive, in a pose similar to that of portrait appearing on the Affiche Rouge
- Born: 3 August 1905; Felsőbánya, Szatmár County, Kingdom of Hungary
- Died: 21 February 1944 (aged 38); Fort Mont-Valérien, Paris, Military Administration in France
- Cause of death: Execution by firing squad
- Military career
- Allegiance: Communist International
- Branch: International Brigades; FTP
- Unit: FTP-MOI

Joseph Boczov or József Boczor, a.k.a. Ferenc Wolff (3 August 1905 – 21 February 1944) was a Romanian chemical engineer, Hungarian Jew, and volunteer fighter for the French liberation army FTP-MOI. In 1942 Boczov founded and led the 4th detachment, called the dérailleurs, as they specialized in derailing trains. A specialist in explosives, Boczov had participated in military operations during the Spanish Civil War. He was executed in 1944 by the Germans after a show trial in Paris of the Manouchian Group.

== Early life and education ==
Boczov was born into a Jewish Hungarian family in Felsobanya. In 1918, Transylvania became part of Romania. He studied science and math, and in college studied chemical engineering. As an young man, he joined the Romanian Communist Party.

== War ==
At the age of 23, Boczov left his home town on foot to fight in Spain for the International Brigades. He spent six months on the roads and in prisons before reaching his goal. While there, he applied his education to explosives warfare. After the defeat of the Spanish republic and refugees' seeking shelter in France, the French interned him and other brothers-at-arms in the camps of Argelès and Gurs. Along with many of his compatriots, Boczov discarded his nationality. As a stateless person, he was deported to Germany. Boczov was the leader of the Romanian group in the camp; he organised an escape during their deportation, and during the escape, he was the last to leave.

=== Second World War ===
Migrating to Paris, Boczov arrived in the 1930s and became connected with the many other Hungarians there. After the Fall of France, when the first groups of the Francs-Tireurs et Partisans (FTP) were formed, he became chief of the first detachment of FTP-Immigrés, composed of Hungaro-Romanians from the region. He organized the first grenade attack on the train station at Belleville, where large quantities of goods were stored in the depots.

Boczov's detachment specialized in derailing SS and Wehrmacht trains. They first worked with simple tools, but refined their techniques as German surveillance improved. As a chemical engineer, Boczov faced with many challenges, and carried on with ingenuity and initiative. As the underground struggle unfolded to higher and higher levels, Boczov's intelligence and experience earned him the leadership of the 4th detachment, assigned to commit sabotage against the railways used by the German army.

From 24 September 1943, Boczov saw he was being followed by the Brigades Spéciales nº 2 of the Renseignements généraux, so went into hiding. He used various addresses in Paris: 85, rue de Turbigo; 1bis, rue Lanneau; and 9, rue Caillaux. On 21 October 1943, Boczov, Léon Goldberg and four other fighters left on a mission to stop a German convoy on the Paris – Troyes line at Grandpuits near Mormant. They successfully derailed the train that night, but failed to notice they were being followed. In a firefight, three resistance fighters were killed or taken prisoner, and the others got away but were identified. The noose was tightening.

Joseph Boczov was arrested on 27 November 1943. Accused of having carried out 20 attacks (which surpassed his successes), he was brought before the military tribunal in February 1944 in a show trial of the Manouchian Group. He was shot at the fort mont Valérien on 21 February 1944 with 21 other members of the group.

Boczov was one of ten men of the Manouchian Group whose name and photo were featured on the Affiche rouge German propaganda poster; he was described by the following:

"BOCZOV JUIF HONGROIS CHEF DÉRAILLEUR 20 ATTENTATS".

Before the war, Boczov worked as a carpenter and lived in the 13th arrondissement of Paris.

== See also ==
- Francs-tireurs et partisans - Main-d'œuvre immigrée
- Affiche rouge

== Sources ==
- F.F.I. – F.T.P.F., Pages de gloire des Vingt-trois, Paris: Immigration, 1951. (French)
- Bowd, Gavin (December 2014). "Romanians of the French Resistance". French History. 28 (4): 541–559. doi:10.1093/fh/cru080. hdl:10023/9636.
