= Joseph Epstein =

Polish-born communist activist and French Resistance leader

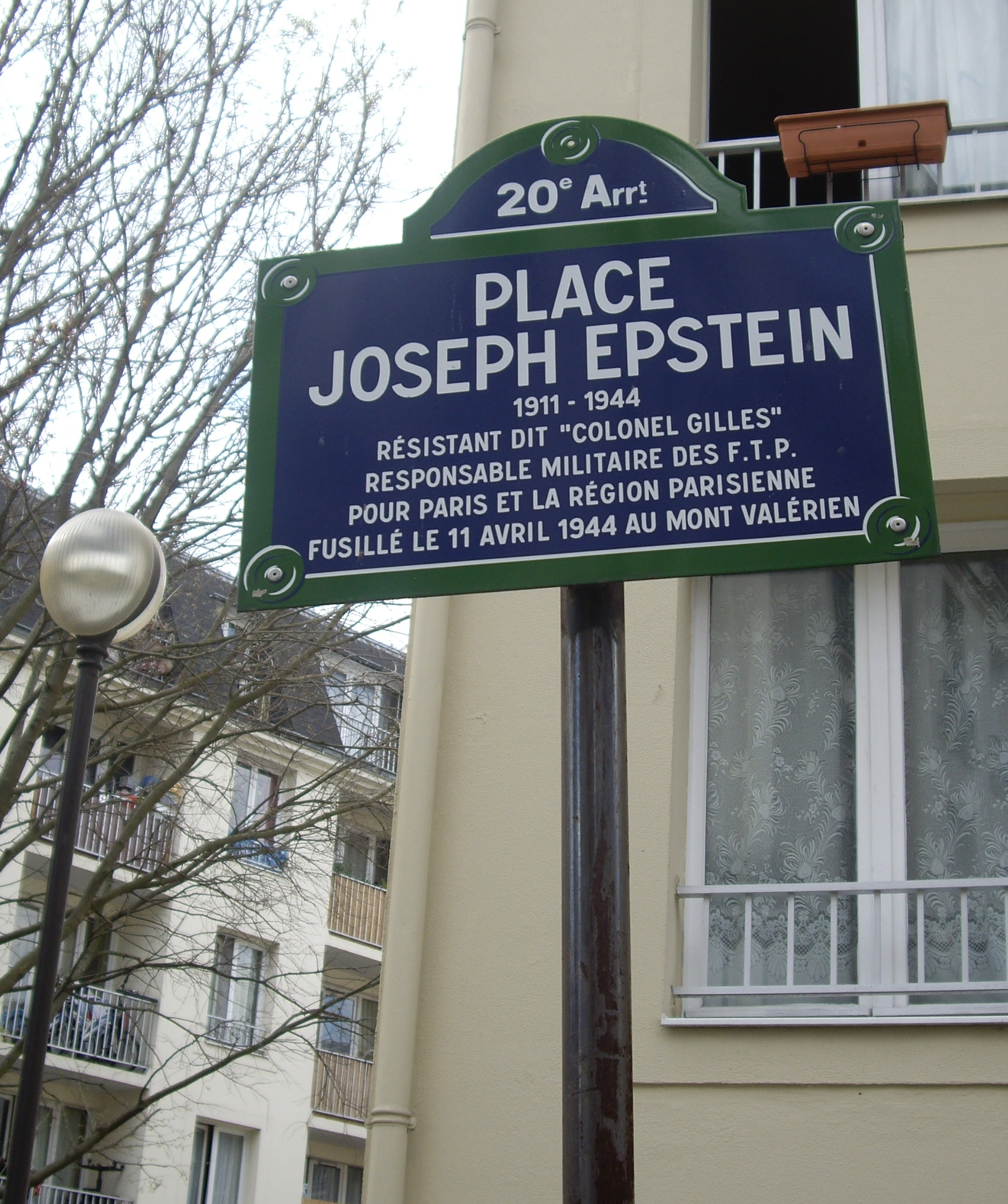

Joseph Epstein (October 16, 1911 – April 11, 1944), also known as Colonel Gilles and as Joseph Andrej, was a Polish-born Jewish communist activist and a French Resistance leader during World War II. He was executed by the Germans.

== Communist organizer ==
Joseph Epstein was born in Zamość, Congress Poland. He studied law at Warsaw University. There he became aware of the Communist Party of Poland, which was outlawed at the time, and later he joined it.

In 1931, he was arrested by the police after speaking at a communist rally, but he was released after a few weeks. He fled to Czechoslovakia, where he sought asylum, but his plea was rejected. Epstein returned to Poland, only long enough to be deported by the authorities.

In Tours (France), where he organized immigrant laborers, Epstein met and married Paula Grynfeld, a Jewish pharmacy student from the city of Łódź in Poland. When the French police were informed by the Polish consulate about his participation in the Communist Party, Epstein was arrested and forced to leave Tours. He and his wife traveled to Bordeaux, where they continued their studies. He organized students into a collective, and he was appointed to the regional committee of the French Communist Party.

In 1933, they moved to Paris. The following year, Epstein passed his final examination, and he completed his law degree; however, he was barred from practicing law because he was not French.

== Armed struggle ==
In 1936, Epstein joined the Republican side in the Spanish Civil War and took part in the defence of Irun where he was severely wounded. In January 1938, he commanded the Romanian communists' artillery battery "Tudor Vladimirescu". On returning to France at the end of 1938, he was imprisoned at Gurs, a detention camp for political refugees and members of the International Brigades.

In 1939, he entered the ranks of the Polish Army, but later resigned and joined the French Foreign Legion. In 1940, he was captured by the Germans and sent to the Stalag IVB prisoner-of-war camp. Epstein escaped from the camp and went to Switzerland, but was deported to Germany. He managed to obtain false papers on the name of Joseph Duffau and moved to Paris.

== With the French Resistance ==
In 1941, he began working with Francs-Tireurs et Partisans (FTP), a communist resistance group; by February 1943, he was an operation commander in the Paris region.

He proposed a new guerrilla warfare tactic. Up till this point, the FTP had been operating in three-person cells: one person attacked and two provided covering fire for their escape. He proposed that the teams should have 10 to 15 fighters. Three or four would throw grenades or bombs, and the rest would cover their withdrawal.

The FTP knew that a formation of Wehrmacht soldiers would take part in a parade in a street leading to place de l'Étoile. Epstein's group decided to attack with twelve men. Three of them would attack with grenades while the other nine would secure their withdrawal. Dozens of soldiers were killed or wounded but only one partisan was wounded. German officers reported that their soldiers were attacked by about a hundred guerillas.

In late 1943, the FTP was betrayed, possibly by Joseph Davidovitch, who was a chief of personnel in Missak Manouchian's group. Davidovitch had been arrested by the Gestapo and then released. He claimed, however, that he had escaped.

On October 16, 1943, Epstein was arrested in Évry-Petit-Bourg during a meeting with Manouchian. He was tortured in Fresnes prison and tried along with nineteen other members of the FTP and sentenced to death. He was executed by firing squad at Fort Mont-Valérien.
