= Mormant =

- Commune
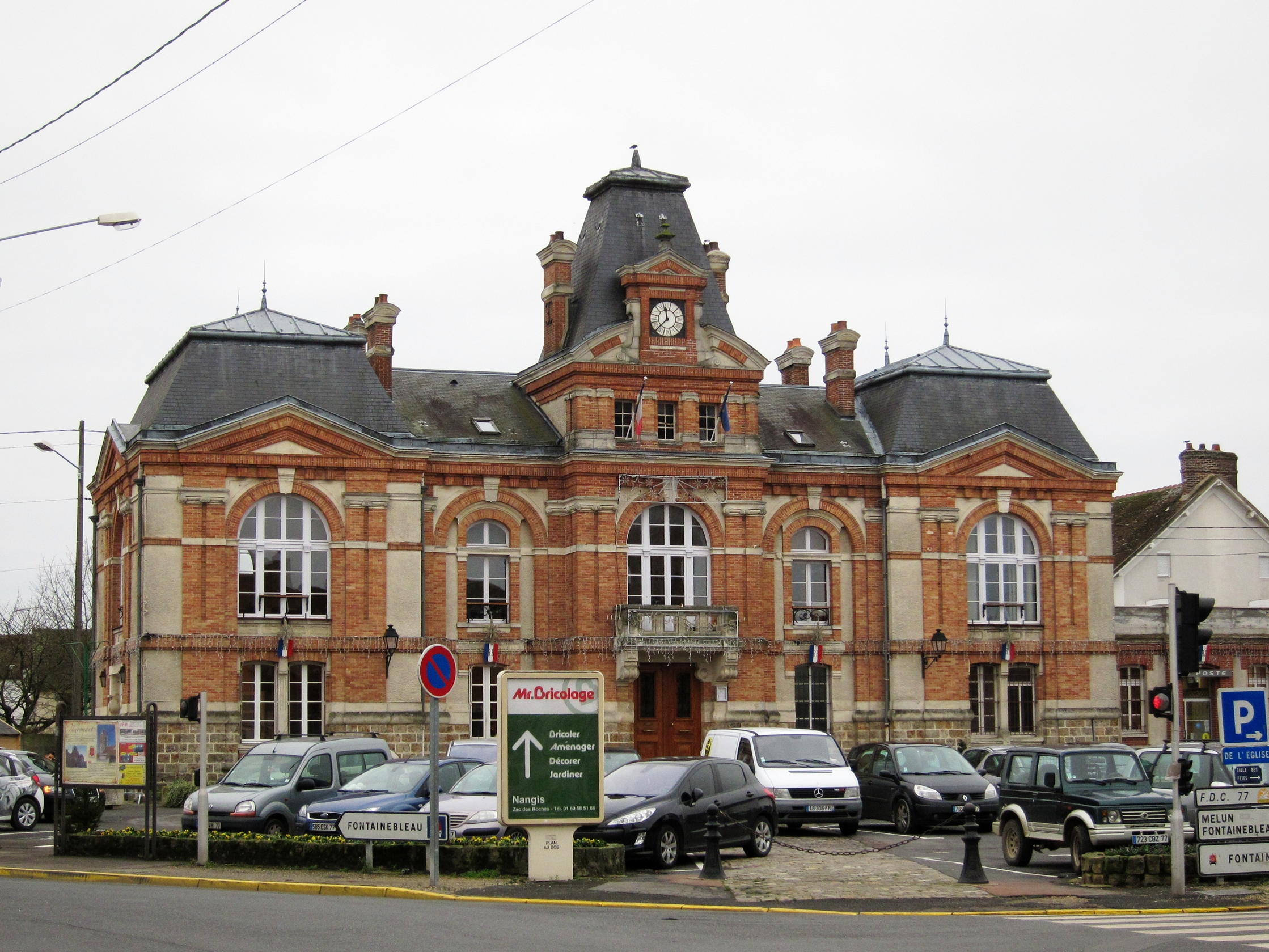
- The town hall in Mormant

- Coat of arms
- Location of Mormant
- Location within France Location within Île-de-France (region)
- Coordinates: 48°36′28″N 2°53′27″E
- Country: France
- Region: Île-de-France
- Department: Seine-et-Marne
- Arrondissement: Provins
- Canton: Nangis
- Intercommunality: CC Brie Nangissienne

Government
  - Mayor (2020–2026): Pierre-Yves Nicot
- Area^{1}: 16.60 km^{2} (6.41 sq mi)
- Highest elevation: 122 m (400 ft)
- Lowest elevation: 100 m (330 ft)
- Population (2023): 5,282
  - Density: 318.2/km^{2} (824.1/sq mi)
- Time zone: UTC+01:00 (CET)
  - Summer (DST): UTC+02:00 (CEST)
- INSEE/Postal code: 77317 /77720
- ^{1} French Land Register data, which excludes lakes, ponds, glaciers > 1 km^{2} (0.386 sq mi or 247 acres) and river estuaries.

Mormant (French pronunciation: [mɔʁmɑ̃]) is a commune in the Seine-et-Marne departement in the Île-de-France region in north-central France. Mormant station has rail connections to Provins, Longueville and Paris.

== Demographics ==
The inhabitants are called Mormantais in French.

Historical population
Year	Pop.	±% p.a.
1968	1,655	—
1975	2,970	+8.71%
1982	3,122	+0.72%
1990	3,603	+1.81%
1999	4,362	+2.15%
2007	4,292	−0.20%
2012	4,503	+0.96%
2017	4,834	+1.43%
2023	5,282	+1.49%
Source: INSEE

== See also ==
- Communes of the Seine-et-Marne department
