= Fort Mont-Valérien =

Fortress in Suresnes, Hauts-de-Seine, France

Coordinates: 48°52′23″N 2°12′47″E

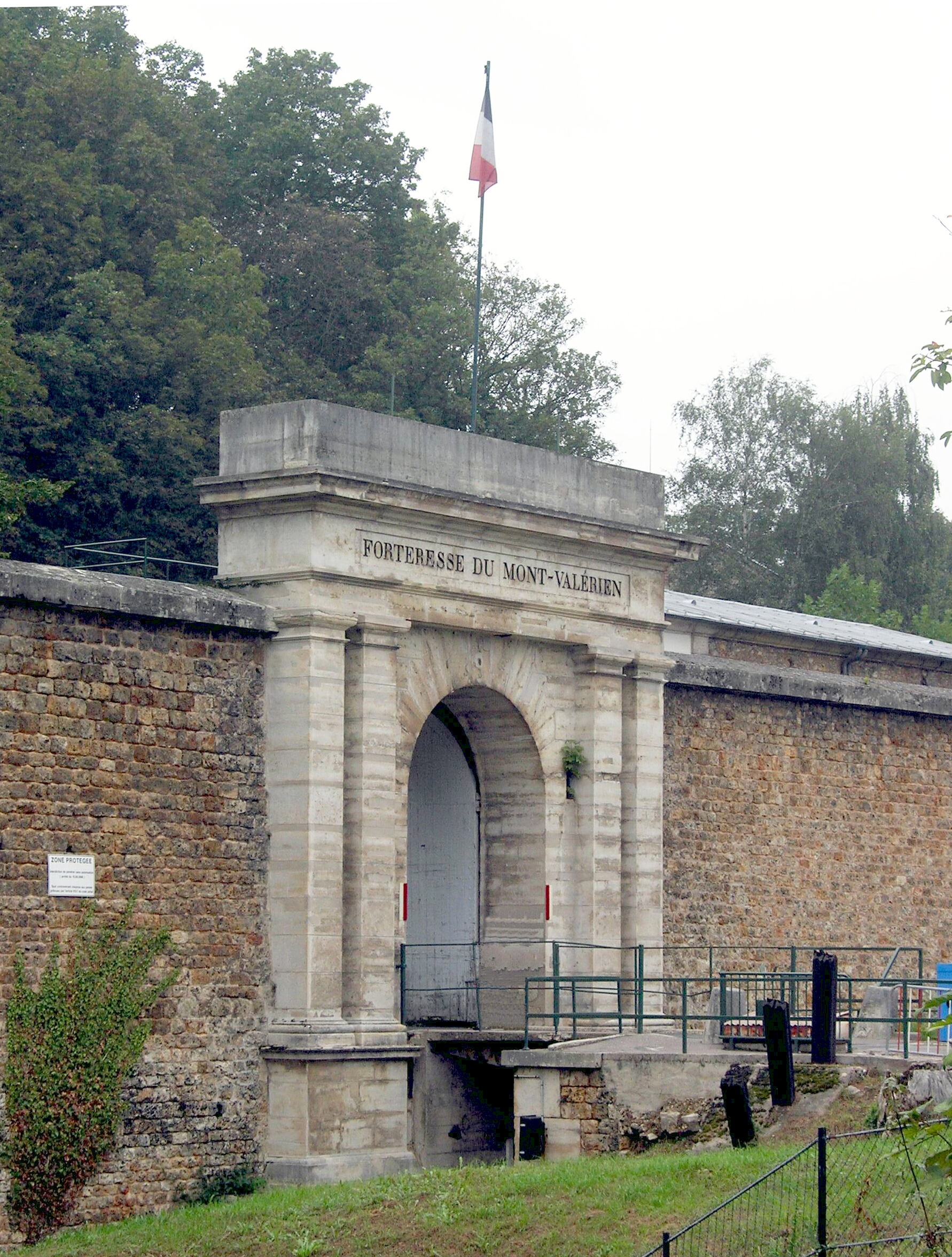
Fort Mont-Valérien entrance

Fort Mont-Valérien (French: Forteresse du Mont-Valérien, [fɔʁtəʁɛs dy mɔ̃valeʁjɛ̃]) is a fortress in Suresnes, a western Paris suburb, built in 1841 as part of the city's ring of modern fortifications. It overlooks the Bois de Boulogne across the Seine.

== History ==
Before Adolphe Thiers built the fortress, Mont Valérien was home to hermits. Since the 15th century a community of hermits lived on the slope of Puteaux similar to the one of Chartreux: private cells, communal holy Mass and holy Office, perpetual silence. Manual labor and prayer divided the days equally.

The fortress defended Paris during the Franco-Prussian War, and remained the strongest fortress protecting the city, withstanding artillery bombardments that lasted several months. The surrender of the fortress was one of the main issues of the armistice signed by the Government of National Defense with Otto von Bismarck on 17 January 1871, allowing the Germans to occupy the strongest part of Paris' defences in exchange for shipments of food into the starving city.

Mont-Valèrien played a key role in the Paris Commune in 1871. The National Guard failed to secure it after the first withdrawal of the regular army from Paris. After their return on March 21, the army used the fort as an important base for the subjugation of the Commune during the Semaine Sanglante, or 'Bloody Week.'

Colonel Henry of army intelligence, a key player in the Dreyfus affair, was confined at the prison of Mont Valérien in 1898. The day after being confined, 31 August 1898, he cut his throat with a razor that had been left in his possession, taking to the grave his secret and that of a great part of the affaire Dreyfus.

During the Second World War, the fortress was used, from 1940 to 1944, as a prison and place of execution by the Nazi occupiers of Paris. The Germans brought prisoners to the prison in trucks from other locations. The prisoners were temporarily confined in a disused chapel, and later taken to be shot in a clearing 100 metres away. The bodies were then buried in various cemeteries in the Paris area. Over 1,000 hostages and resistants were executed there by the Nazis.

After the war, the site became a national memorial. The area in front of the "Mémorial de la France combattante", a reminder of the French Resistance against the German occupation forces, was named Square Abbé Franz Stock. During the German occupation, Stock took care of condemned prisoners here, and he mentioned 863 executions at Mont Valérien in his diary. On 18 June 1945, Charles de Gaulle consecrated Fort Mont-Valérien in a public ceremony.

== Executions during World War II ==
Those people executed were all men as a French law, observed by the Germans, prohibited execution of women by firing squad. The 1,008 recorded executions by the Wehrmacht at Mont-Valérien between 1941 and 1944. The immense majority were members of the French Resistance, including:

- Henri Honoré d'Estienne d'Orves, 29 August 1941;
- Gabriel Péri, 15 December 1941, among a group of 70 men (including 53 Jews) shot that same day;
- Boris Vildé, Anatole Lewitsky, Pierre Walter, Léon-Maurice Nordmann, Georges Ithier, Jules Andrieu, and René Sénéchal: members of the Groupe du musée de l'Homme, 23 February 1942:
- Georges Paulin, 21 March 1942;
- André Pican, 23 May 1942
- Georges Politzer, 23 May 1942
- Jacques Decour, 30 May 1942
- Valentin Feldman, 27 July 1942, who shouted to the German soldier before being shot: "Imbéciles, I am dying for you too!"
- Nicolae Cristea, 9 March 1943
- Missak Manouchian, Joseph Boczov, Léon Goldberg, Thomas Elek, Spartaco Fontanot, and 18 other members of the Affiche Rouge group, 21 February 1944;
- Joseph Epstein, 11 April 1944;
- A group of 93 prisoners, 11 August 1944

== Museum of military pigeons ==
The fortress includes the last active military dovecote in Europe and a small museum dedicated to the history of military carrier pigeons (Musée de la Colombophilie Militaire). It is open to groups by appointment and to individuals during the annual European Heritage Days.

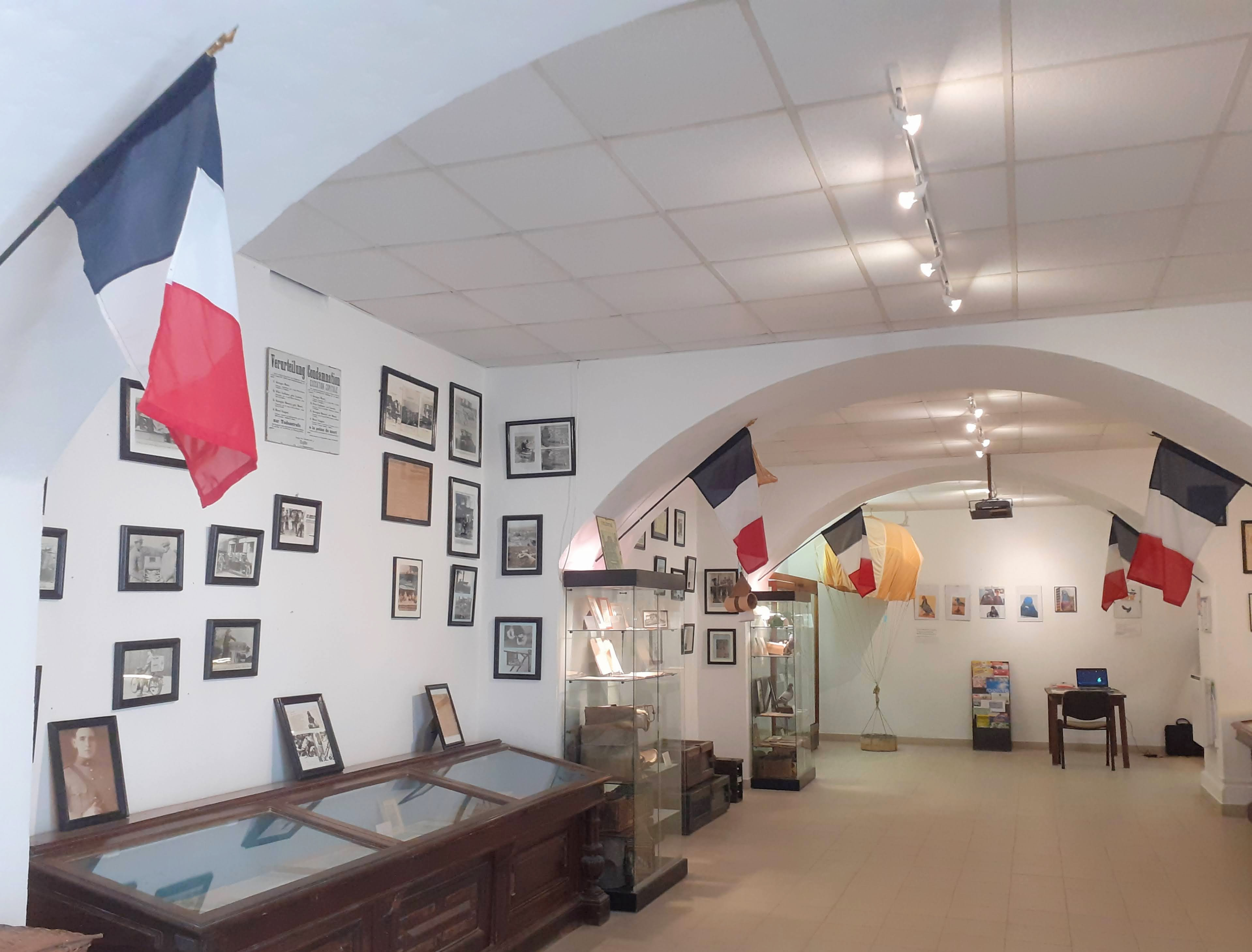

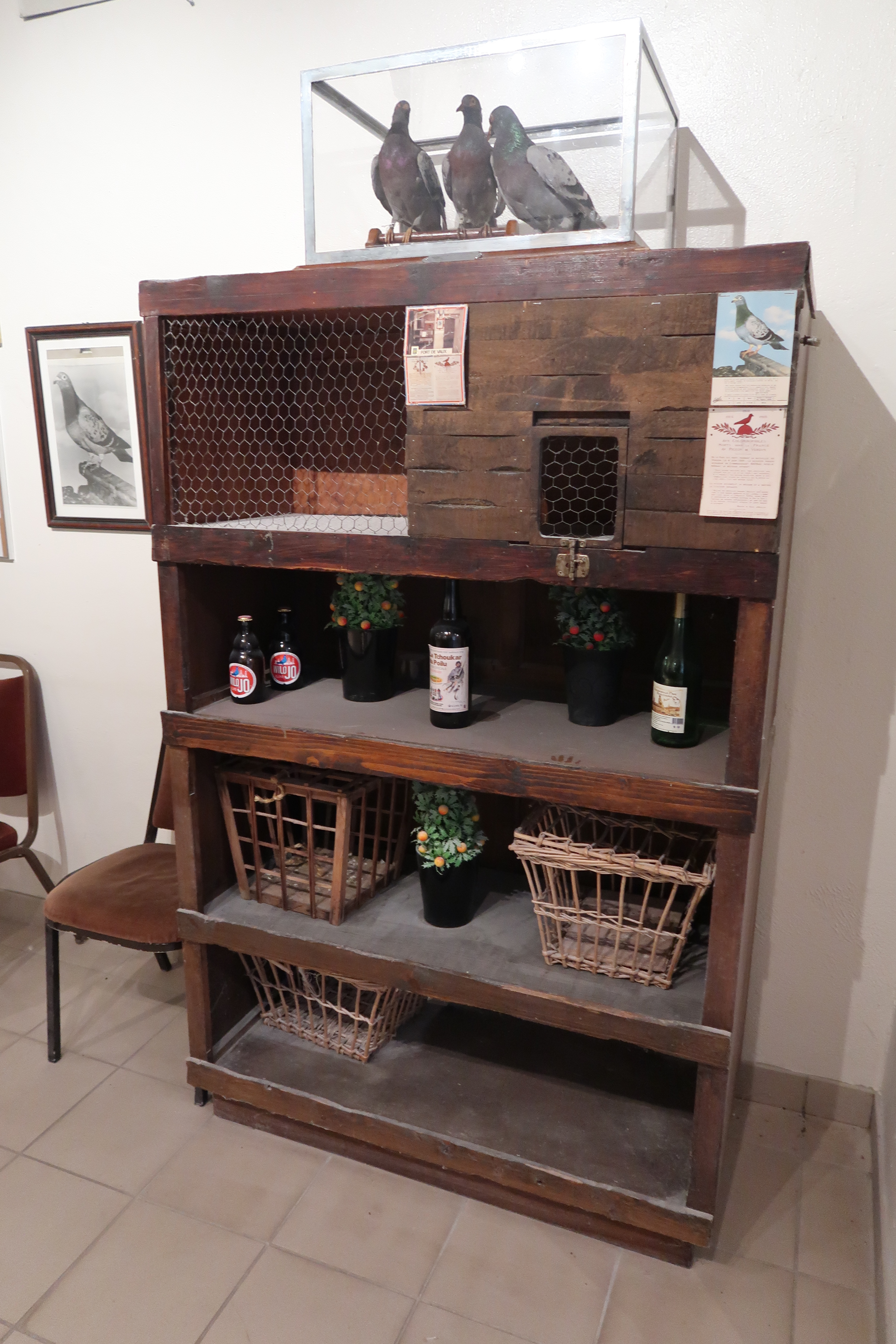

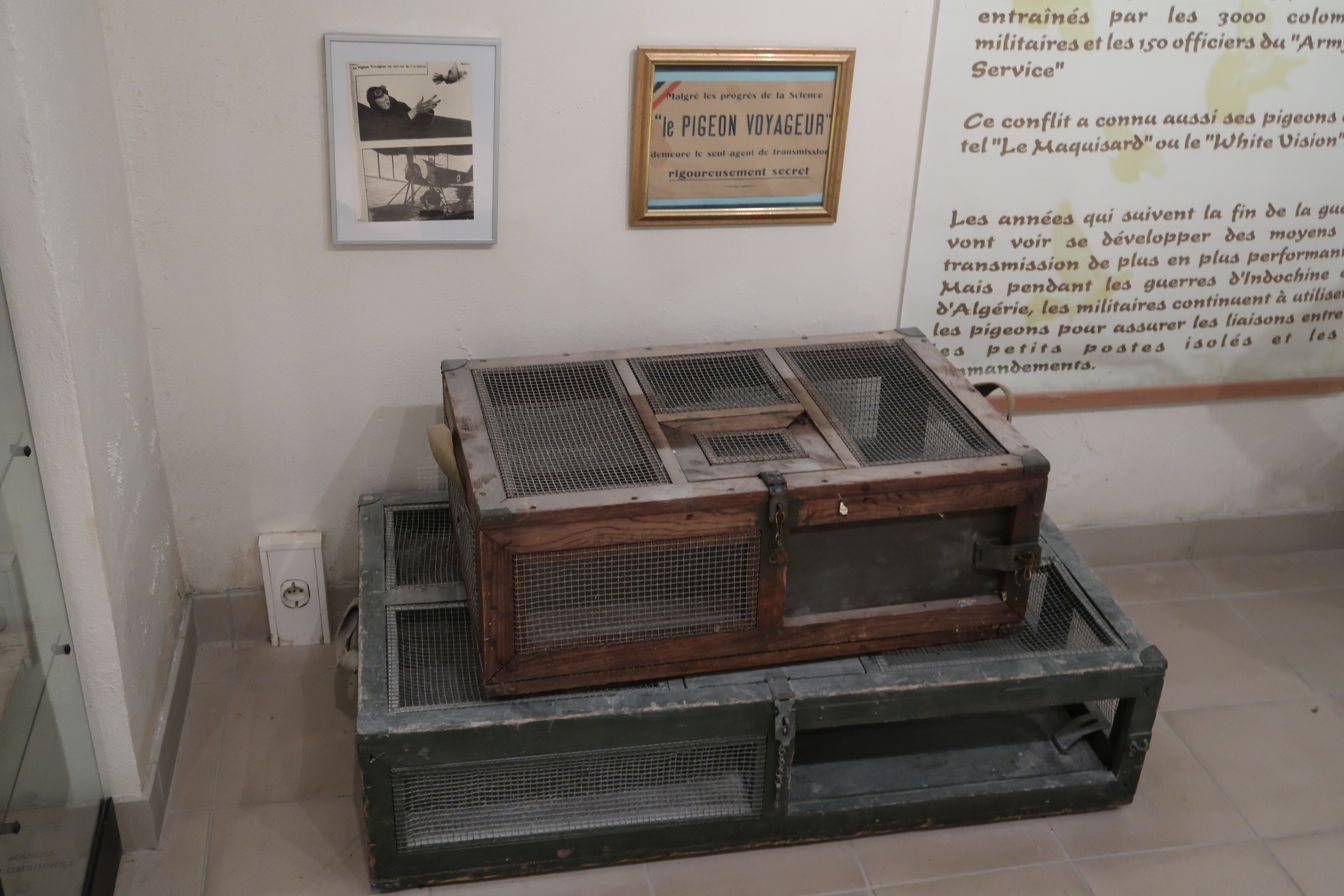

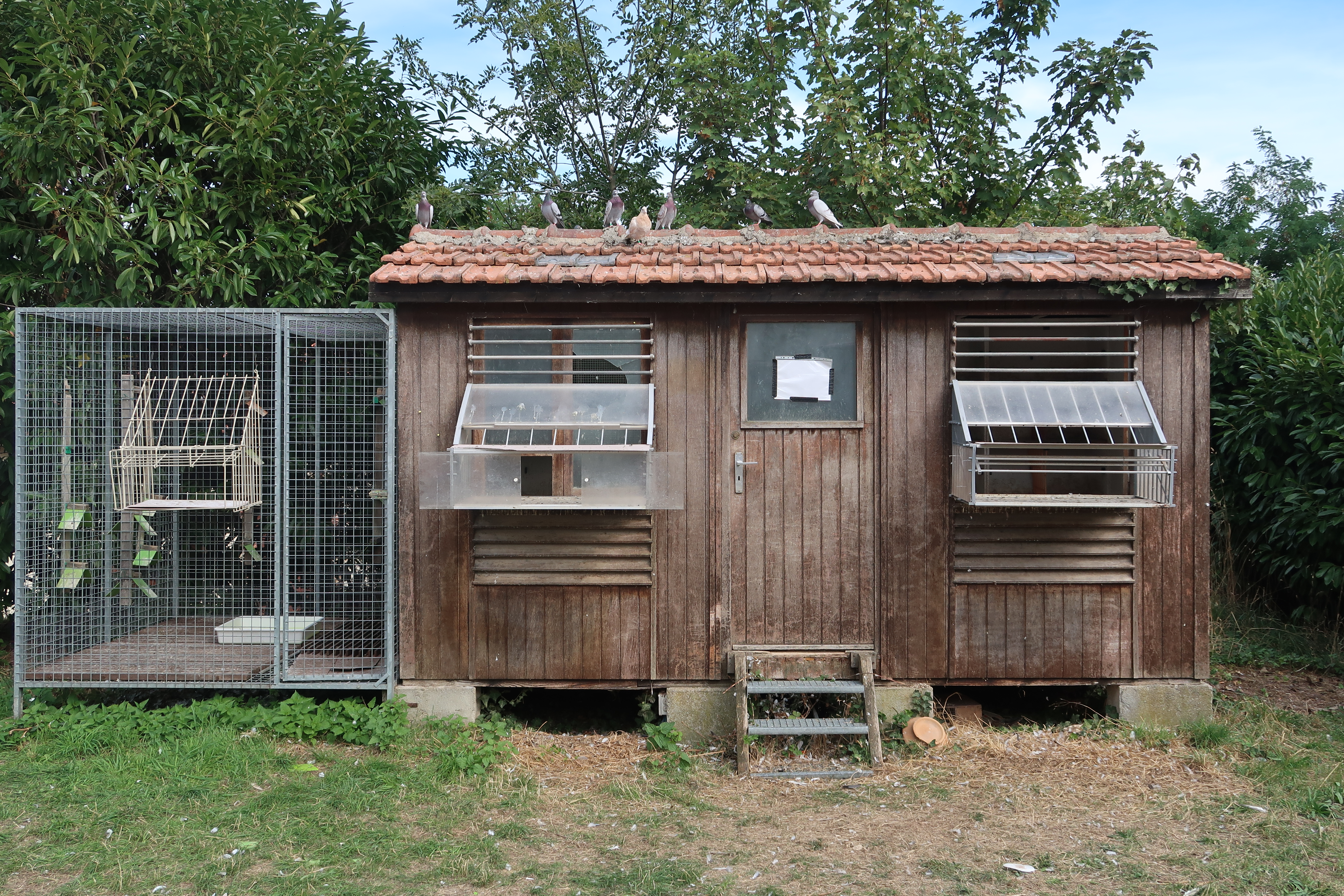

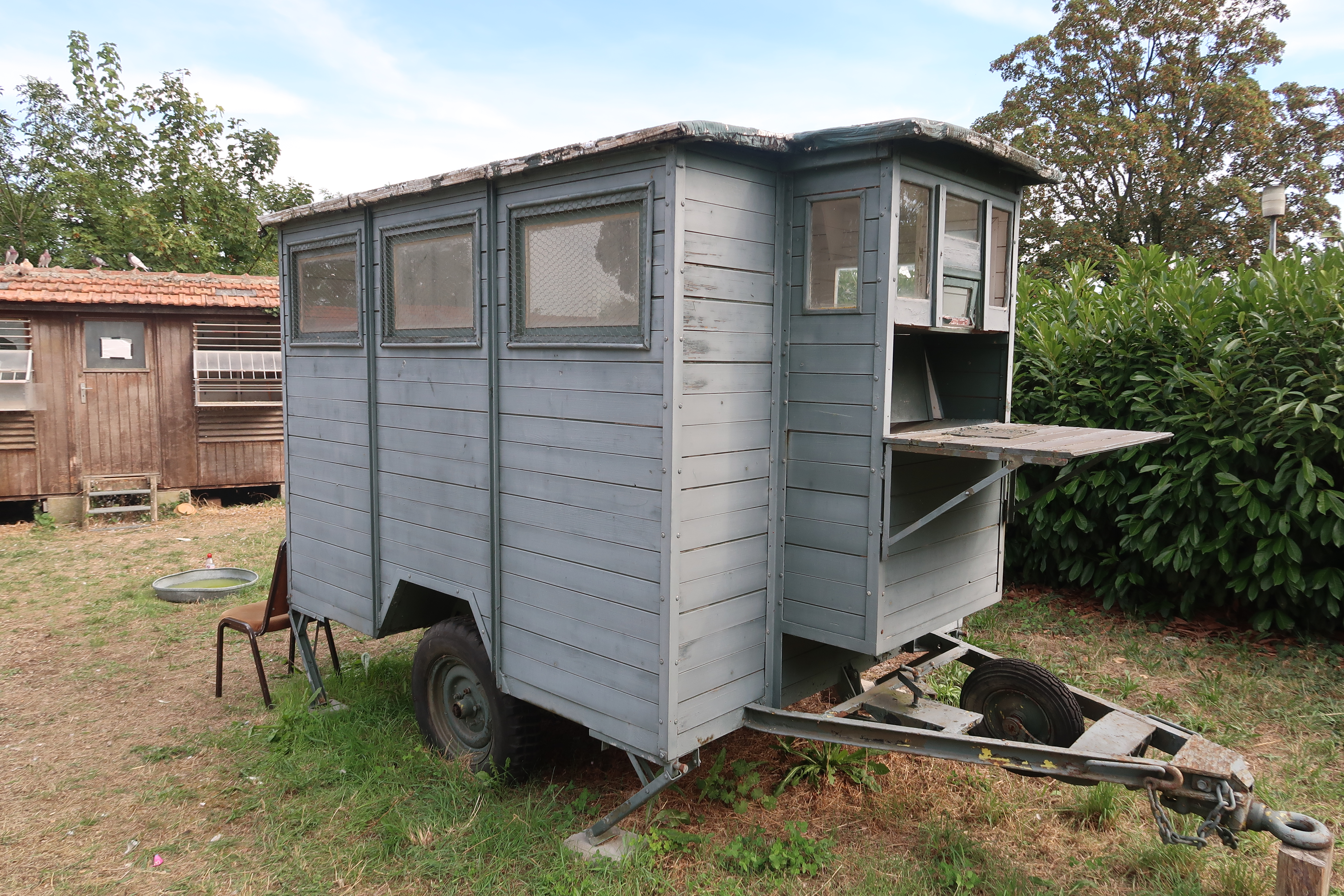

== Sources ==
- Official website
- Le Mont-Valerien website
