= Agnès Humbert =

French art historian

- Born: Agnès Dorothée Humbert; 12 October 1894; Dieppe, France
- Died: 19 September 1963 (aged 68); Valmondois (Val d'Oise), France
- Other names: Agnès Sabbagh, Agnès Sabbert, Agnès Sabert
- Occupations: Art historian and ethnographer

Agnès Humbert (12 October 1894 – 19 September 1963) was an art historian, ethnographer and a member of the French Resistance during World War II. She has become well known through the publication of a translation of the diary of her experiences during the War in France and in German prisons at the time of the Nazi occupation.

== Biography ==
=== Early life ===
Agnès Dorothée Humbert, known as Agnès Humbert, was born on 12 October 1894 in Dieppe, France, daughter of French senator Charles Humbert and English writer Mabel Wells Annie Rooke (granddaughter of English newspaper editor Joseph Drew).

She spent her childhood in Paris, where she studied painting and design. She was a pupil of Maurice Denis alongside Georges Hanna Sabbagh, whom she married in January 1916. She then continued to paint, using the pseudonym Agnès Sabbert, or Agnès Sabert. She also worked as an illustrator; she was the illustrator of the 1928 edition of Albert Samain's Au jardin de l'infante. She had two sons with Sabbagh: Jean Sabbagh, a naval officer and advisor to General Charles de Gaulle, and television director and producer Pierre Sabbagh. Agnès and Georges divorced in 1934.

From 1929 Humbert studied the history of art at the Sorbonne and at the Louvre school, and took postgraduate courses in philosophy and ethnography. She then worked as an art historian at the Musée national des Arts et Traditions Populaires (then at the Palais de Chaillot in Paris) becoming a close associate of the museum's director Georges-Henri Rivière. Her first publication was a book on the painter Louis David, published in 1936. She broadcast on art on Radio Paris at the start of 1936.

=== Wartime resistance ===
From the fall of Paris until her arrest and interrogation by the Gestapo in April 1941, Humbert kept a written diary. Apart from a few scribbled notes, she only resumed writing her diary after her liberation from prison four years later in April 1945.

==== The Nazis in Paris ====
A few days after the fall of Paris on 14 June 1940, having fled Paris to be with her mother at the house of her cousin Daisy Drew at Vicq-sur-Breuilh, by chance she heard an appeal by General de Gaulle on the BBC's Radio France encouraging the people of France to continue the struggle against the occupying Germans and the Vichy government. It was offensive to her when books were removed from her library by the Germans, and German authors added. On 6 August a notice was fixed on the gateway of the Palais de Chaillot, ordering free entry to German soldiers, and she wrote in her diary that she told her colleague Jean Cassou "I feel I will go mad, literally, if I don't do something!". So, with Boris Vildé, Anatole Lewitsky, Jean Cassou and Yvonne Oddon she formed the Groupe du musée de l'Homme out of members of the Museum, the first resistance movement in occupied France. In a few months these pioneers built a highly diffuse underground network. Their action spread rapidly with the creation of a clandestine newsletter, Résistance, which had only five issues, between 15 December 1940 and the end of March 1941, with editorials (the first written by Boris Vildé) holding no illusions on Pétain and the Vichy government. This group went on to feed information to the British.

==== Trials and imprisonment ====
The leaders of the resistance cell were betrayed and arrested in April 1941. Humbert then recruited Pierre Brossolette to continue with the last number of Résistance before being arrested herself. The Museum group were sent to the harsh Cherche-Midi prison and then Fresnes Prison in Paris where they were tried by the Wehrmacht and in February 1942, along with seven members of the group, sentenced to death. However she was transferred to the Prison de la Santé where conditions were better and she was visited by her son Pierre and her mother, but she learnt that the men had been put to death by firing squad (they sang "Vive la France" in their last moments). The women were sentenced to five years slave labour and deported to Anrath prison in Germany. Humbert was made to work in appalling conditions at the Phrix rayon factory in Krefeld: there workers died, went blind, and developed horrible skin conditions. After four years, in June 1945 she was liberated by the Third United States Army and her diary records how she took part in the "Nazi Hunt" at Wanfried in 1945. She set up soup kitchens for refugees and expressly stated that everyone was to get a share, even the German civilians. Later she helped to start the denazification process.

=== Post-war ===
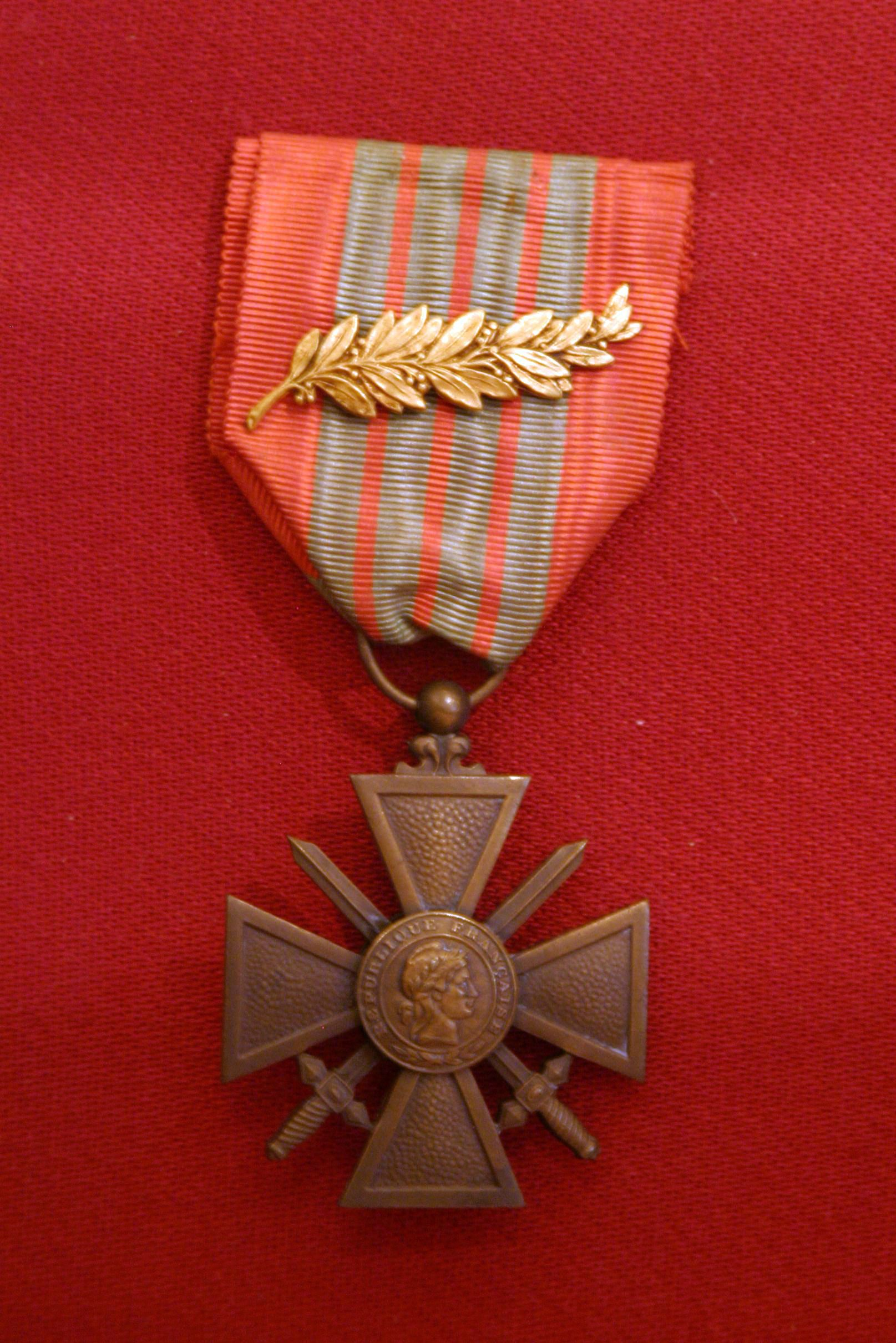
Croix de Guerre with palm

After the war, Humbert refused to return to work at the Museum, but instead joined Jean Cassou at the new National Museum of Modern Art. Though her health had been affected by her experiences, she continued to write books on art.

She published her diary under the title Notre Guerre in 1946. This was later reissued and translated into English by Barbara Mellor as Résistance, Memoirs of Occupied France.

In 1949 she was awarded the Croix de Guerre with silver gilt palm for heroism.

She spent her final years living with her son Pierre in the village of Valmondois and is buried in the cemetery there. Her last work was an introduction to the catalogue of a Maurice Denis exhibition at the Toulouse-Lautrec Museum in Albi in the summer of 1963. She died ten days before the end of the exhibition.

== Publications ==
- Agnès Humbert, Louis David, peintre et conventionnel: essai de critique marxiste, Paris, Editions sociales internationales, 1936.
- Agnès Humbert, Louis David, collection des Maîtres, 60 illustrations, Paris, Braun, 1940.
- Agnès Humbert (introduction), L. Chevojon (photographs), Le Musée National d'Art Moderne: Peinture, sculpture, Paris, Musée National d'Art Moderne, 1948.
- Agnès Humbert and Nadeshda Ferber, Die französische Malerei von den Anfängen zum Impressionismus ("French painting from the beginnings of Impressionism"), 30 illustrations, Berlin, Minerva-Verlag, 1949.
- Agnès Humbert, Vu et entendu en Yougoslavie ("Seen and heard in Yugoslavia"), Paris, Deux-Rives, 1950.
- Henri Barbusse, Agnès Humbert and Max Lingner, Max Lingner, 30 reproductions, Academy of Arts, Berlin, 1950.
- Agnès Humbert, (preface by Jean Cassou), Les Nabis et leur époque 1888–1900, 51 plates, Genève, Pierre Callier, 1954.
- Agnès Humbert, (introduction in French and English), La Sculpture Contemporaine au Musée National d'Art Moderne de Paris, Paris, Albert Morancé, 1954.
- Gaston Diehl (notes by Agnès Humbert), Henri Matisse, 140 colour plates and illustrations, Paris, Pierre Tisné, 1954 (also New York, Universe Books, 1958).
- Agnès Humbert, Henri Matisse, dessins, pocket edition with 42 drawings, Paris, Fernand Hazan, 1956.
- Agnès Humbert (photographs by Guy de Belleval, tr. Joan Dalrymple), Contemporary Painters: Jean-Jacques Morvan, Genève, Rene Kister, 1962.
- Agnès Humbert, Exposition Maurice Denis: Peintures, aquarelles, dessins, lithographies. Du 28 juin au 29 septembre 1963 introduction to the catalogue of the exhibition at the Musée Toulouse-Lautrec, in Albi, 1963.

Her Journal:

- Agnès Humbert (introduction by Julien Blanc), Notre guerre: Souvenirs de Résistance, Paris 1940–41, 2ème éd., Tallandier, 2004 (in French). Published in 1946, on the return from her detention.
