= Jean Cassou =

French writer, art critic and poet (1897–1986)

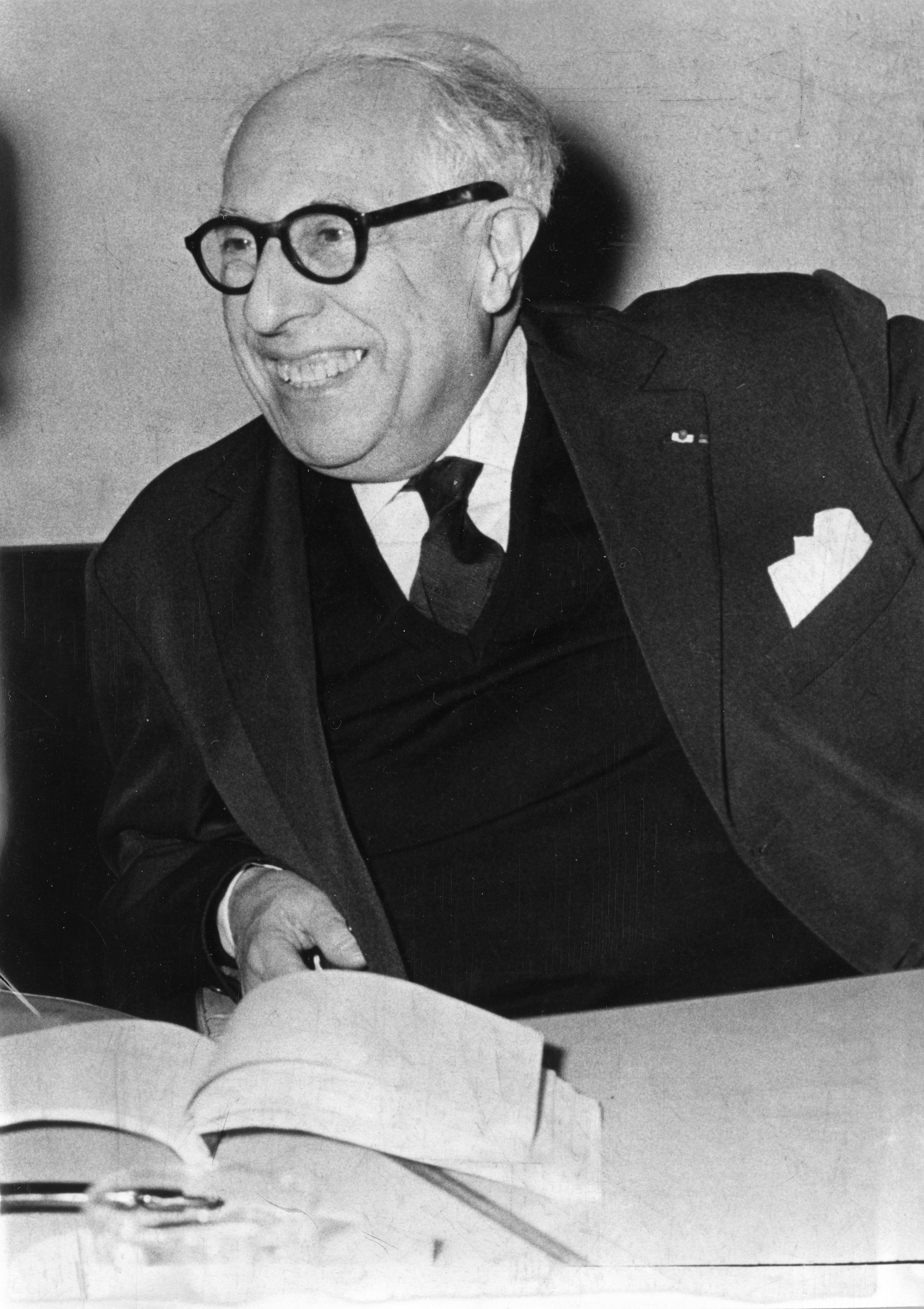
Jean Cassou in Belgrade 1963

Jean Cassou (French pronunciation: [ʒɑ̃ kasu]; 9 July 1897 – 15 January 1986) was a French writer, art critic, poet, member of the French Resistance during World War II and the first Director of the Musée National d'Art Moderne in Paris.

== Career ==
Jean Cassou was born at Bilbao, Spain. His father was French with a Mexican mother while Cassou's mother was from the southern Andalucia part of Spain. His father, who had the prestigious degree Ingénieur des Arts et Manufactures, died when Jean was only sixteen. His mother gave Jean and his sister basic Spanish culture, and he learnt French and Spanish classics side by side at school. Jean did secondary studies at the Lycée Charlemagne while providing for the needs of his family, then began study for the Licence d'espagnol Spanish degree at the Faculty of Letters in Paris. This he followed in 1917 and 1918 by getting a master's degree at the Bayonne Lycée and, though interrupted many times, was not mobilised in World War I. He was Secretary to Pierre Louÿs, writing from 1921 to 1929 his monthly chronicle "Spanish Letters" in the cultural magazine Le Mercure de France (of which he was editor). He became in 1923 the writer for the Ministry of State Education and in 1926 published his first novel.

In 1932 Jean Cassou became an inspector of historic monuments. In 1934 he became a member of the Vigilance Committee of anti-fascist intellectuals and director from 1936 of the review Europe. In 1936 he was a member of the cabinet of Jean Zay, Minister of State Education and of the Art-schools of the Popular Front. He was then in favour of the Spanish Republic and socialism, and approached the communist party – but broke with them in 1939 at the time of the Germano-Soviet pact. On the approach of the German army, he went to the castle at Compiègne and devoted himself to the safeguard of the national heritage.

Relieved of his post in September 1940, after only several weeks, as first Chief Conservator of the Museum of Modern Art by the Vichy régime, he joined the Resistance in September 1940, writing its first leaflets. Among his friends who shared his views were Claude Aveline and Agnès Humbert and they founded the clandestine group the Groupe du musée de l'Homme, together with Boris Vildé, Anatole Lewitsky and Paul Rivet. With Claude Aveline, Agnès Humbert, Simone Martin-Chauffier and Marcel Abraham, he drafted the group's periodical called Résistance (six numbers between December 1940 and March 1941). When many members of the group were arrested, he escaped the Gestapo and took refuge at Toulouse. He was an agent of the "Bertaux group" in August 1941, and was arrested 13 December 1941 for his activities at the Musée de l'Homme. Held incommunicado by the Vichy regime for two months without access to writing materials, he composed 33 sonnets, keeping them in memory until a few days before his provisional release in February, when he was allowed a few sheets of paper and a pencil. After going to trial, he was sentenced to a year in prison. The sonnets were published in 1944 as Thirty-three sonnets composed in secret under the pseudonym Jean Noir.

After a year in prison, he was sent by the ST to an internment camp at Saint-Sulpice (Tarn). After a month, following a plea from the Resistance to the director of ST, he was released in June 1943 and continued his active work for the Resistance using the pseudonyms "Alain" and "Fournier". He became inspector of the southern zone. The Provisional Government of the French Republic in Algeria named him in June 1944 as Commissioner of the Republic for the Toulouse Region. In August, at the time of the liberation of the town, his car met an armed German patrol: two of his companions were killed and he was left for dead. He spent three weeks in a coma. General Charles de Gaulle came to his bedside to present him with the Croix de la Libération. Though his job was replaced he kept the title, but resigned after convalescing for a year.

In 1945 Jean Cassou regained his post as Director of the French National Museum for Modern Art, the Musée National d'Art Moderne. He kept the post until 1965. In 1949 he wrote to John Reed expressing interest in exhibiting Sidney Nolan's work in the same year as Nolan's UNESCO exhibition for which Cassou had written the catalogue's foreword. Before Cassou was appointed as Director, he had maintained excellent relations with artists. So the Musée National d'Art Moderne was able to negotiate generous prices with Henri Matisse and Picasso. Artists also donated important works to the museum. Art collectors helped to build a comprehensive perspective on Modern Art with donations of specific quality and quantity. But the Cassou directorship also disappointed, because the museum exhibited foreign art and American fine art in particular, geometric abstraction, Surrealism, and little in the way of contemporary art.

In 1971 Cassou received the Grand prix national des Lettres and in 1983 the Grand Prix de la Société des Gens de Lettres for the whole of his work. He died on 15 January 1986 and is buried in the Cimetière de Thiais, near Paris. He was a militant activist for the Peace Movement and brother-in-law of the philosopher Vladimir Jankélévitch. A bronze bust by Madeleine de Tézenas is in the Place de la Résistance in Toulouse.

Composer Henri Dutilleux set four of his poems to music between 1944 and 1956 (La Geôle, Il n'y avait que des troncs déchirés, J'ai rêvé que je vous portais entre mes bras, Eloignez-vous). Darius Milhaud set six of them to music for mixed chorus in 1946: La barque funéraire, Mort à toute fortune, A peine si le cœur, Bois cette tasse de ténèbres, Rose d'Alexandrie, and Quel est ton nom?.

== Works ==
=== Novels ===
- Éloge de la Folie, 1925
- Les harmonies viennoises, Paris, Émile Paul, 1926
- Les inconnus dans la cave, Paris, Gallimard, 1933
- Les massacres de Paris, Paris, Gallimard, 1935
- La clef des songes, 1928
- Comme une grande image, Editions Emile-Paul frères, 1931
- Le centre du monde, Paris, Le Sagittaire, 1945
- Le Temps d'aimer, Paris, Albin Michel, 1959; Paru en septembre 1958 dans la revue de Paris sous le titre Les Questions rétrospectives
- Dernières pensées d'un amoureux, Paris, Albin Michel, 1962
- Le voisinage des cavernes, Paris, Albin Michel, 1971

=== Essays ===
- Les nuits de Musset, Paris, Émile Paul, 1931
- Grandeur et infamie de Tolstoï, Paris, Bernard Grasset, 1932
- Pour la poésie, Paris, Corréa, 1935
- Quarante-huit, Paris, Gallimard, 1939
- La mémoire courte, Paris, Éditions de Minuit, 1954; repub. Mille et une Nuits, 2001
- Parti pris, Paris, Albin Michel, 1961
- La création des mondes, Paris, Éditions Ouvrières, 1971
- Une vie pour la liberté, Paris, Robert Laffont, 1981

=== Art criticism ===
- Situation de l'Art Moderne, Paris, Éditions de Minuit, 1950
- Panorama des Arts Plastiques contemporains, Paris, Gallimard, 1960
- Jan Le Witt, by Sir Herbert Read and Jean Cassou, 1971
- The Concise Encyclopedia of Symbolism. Chartwell Books, Inc., Secaucus, New Jersey, 292 pp. (1979) ISBN 0-89009-706-2 (English edition, translated by Susie Sanders)

=== Poetry ===
- Trente-trois sonnets composés au secret, Paris, Éditions de Minuit, 1944; repub. Poésie/Gallimard, 1995
- La rose et le vin
- La folie d'Amadis

=== Other ===
- Ford, Ford Madox, ed. (January 1924). "Concorde". The Transatlantic Review. 1 (1). London: Duckworth & Co.: 53–58.
- La vie de Philippe II. Paris. Gallimard. 1929. 12. Ed. (Orig. 1927. Vies des hommes, illustrated. No. 29 )
- Panorama de la littérature espagnole contemporaine, Paris, Kra, 1929 (later edition 1931)
- Tempête sur l'Espagne, Paris, L'Homme réel, 1936
- La querelle du réalisme, Paris, ESI, 1936
- Cervantes, Paris, ESI, 1936
- Légion, Paris, Gallimard, 1939
- L'heure du choix (collection), Paris, Éditions de Minuit, 1947
- Le quarante-huitard, Paris, PUF, 1948
- La voie libre, Paris, Flammarion, 1951

=== Translations and adaptations by Cassou ===
- L'Agonie du Christianisme, translated from an essay by Miguel de Unamuno, Paris, F. Rieder, 1925
- Font au Cabres, dramatic fresco in three acts by Lope de Vega, Paris, Les Ordres de Chevalerie, 1949, with Jean Camp, lithographs by Carlos Fontsere

=== Translations of Cassou into English ===
- Chagall, 'The World of Art Library' series. Thames & Hudson, UK 1965
- 33 Sonnets of the Resistance and other poems, Timothy Adès, Arc Publications, UK 2002
- The Madness of Amadis and other poems, Timothy Adès, Agenda Editions, UK 2009
