= Georges Hanna Sabbagh =

Egyptian-born French painter (1877–1951)

George Hanna Sabbagh
- Born: 10 August 1887; Alexandria, Egypt
- Died: 9 December 1951 (aged 64); Paris, France
- Citizenship: Egyptian, French
- Education: École du Louvre
- Occupations: Visual artist, teacher
- Spouse: Agnès Humbert (m. 1916–1934; divorced)
- Children: 2, including Pierre Sabbagh, Jean Sabbagh

Georges Hanna Sabbagh (1877–1951) was an Egyptian-born French visual artist and teacher, his father was Syrian and his mother was Lebanese. He was known for his oil paintings, but he also worked in watercolor, pastels, and as an engraver. He taught at the Académie Ranson, and the School of Fine Arts, Cairo.

== Biography ==
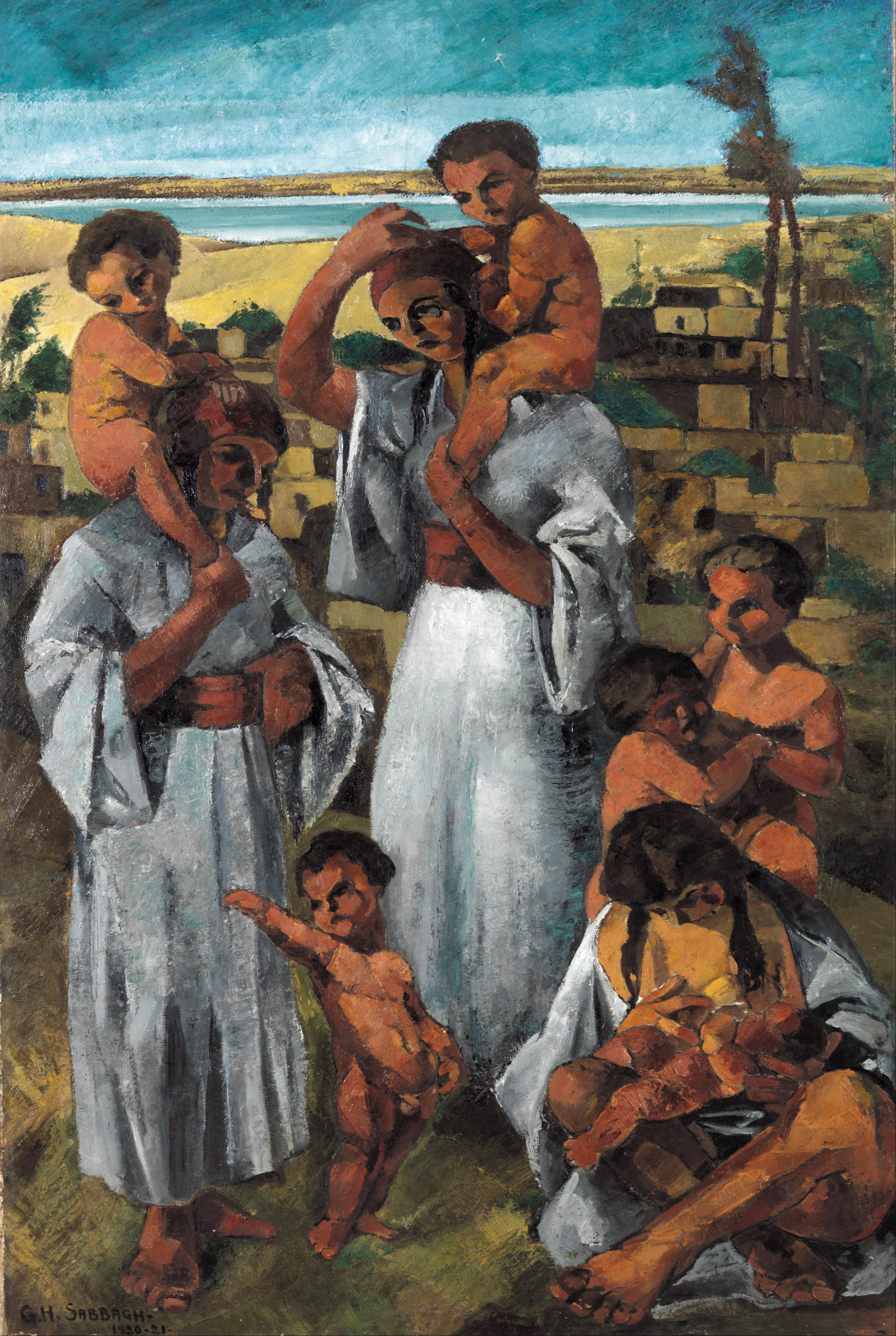
Maternités arabes (Arab Motherhood)

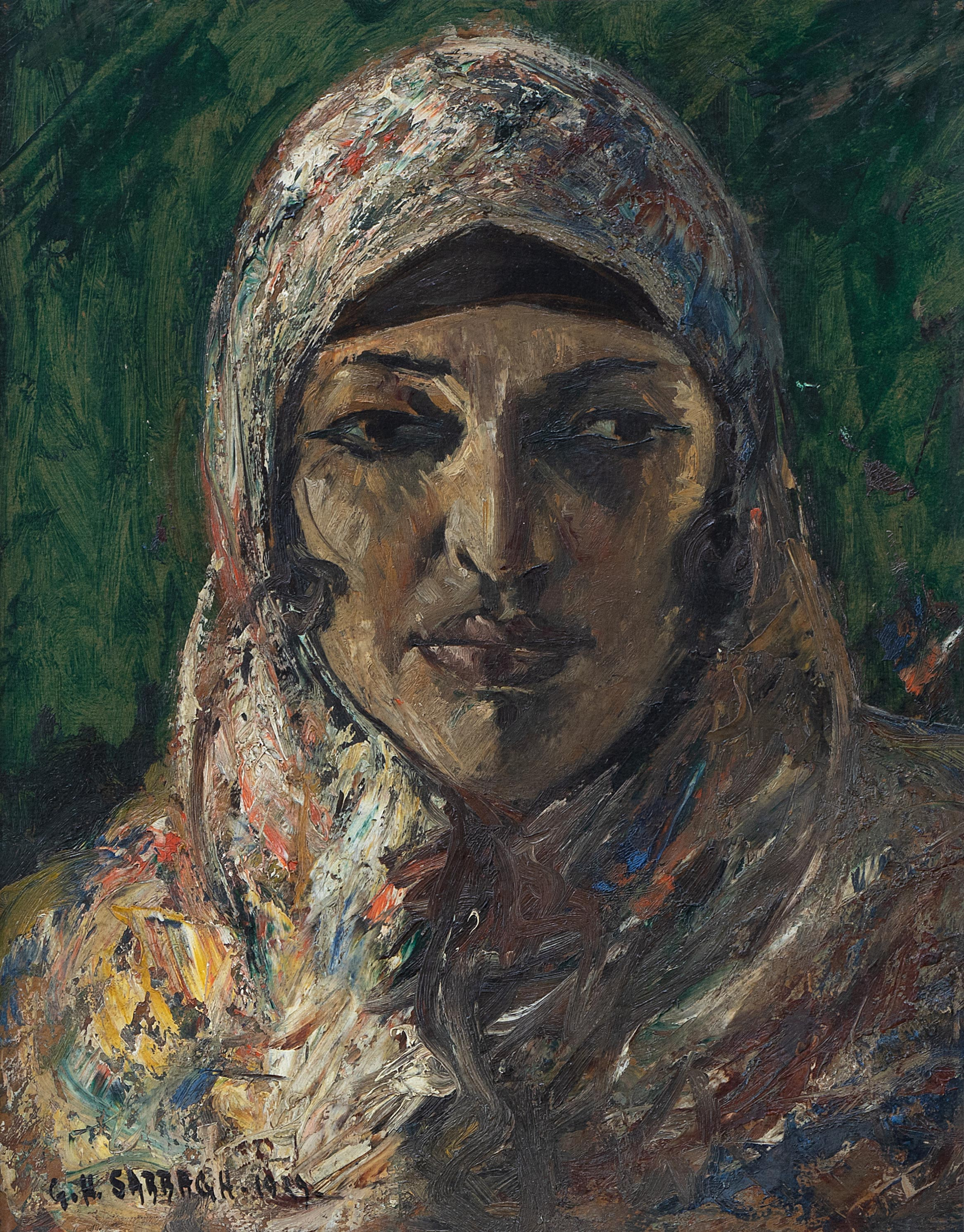
Georges Hanna Sabbagh Portrait de Femme Orientale

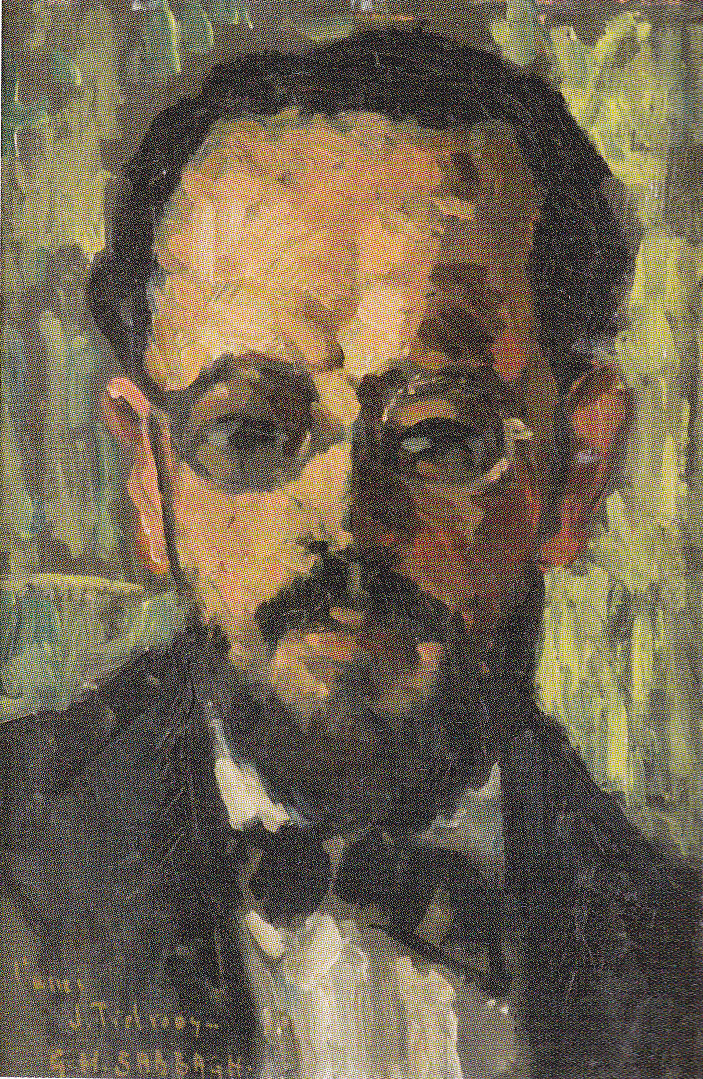
Portrait of Johannes Tielrooy

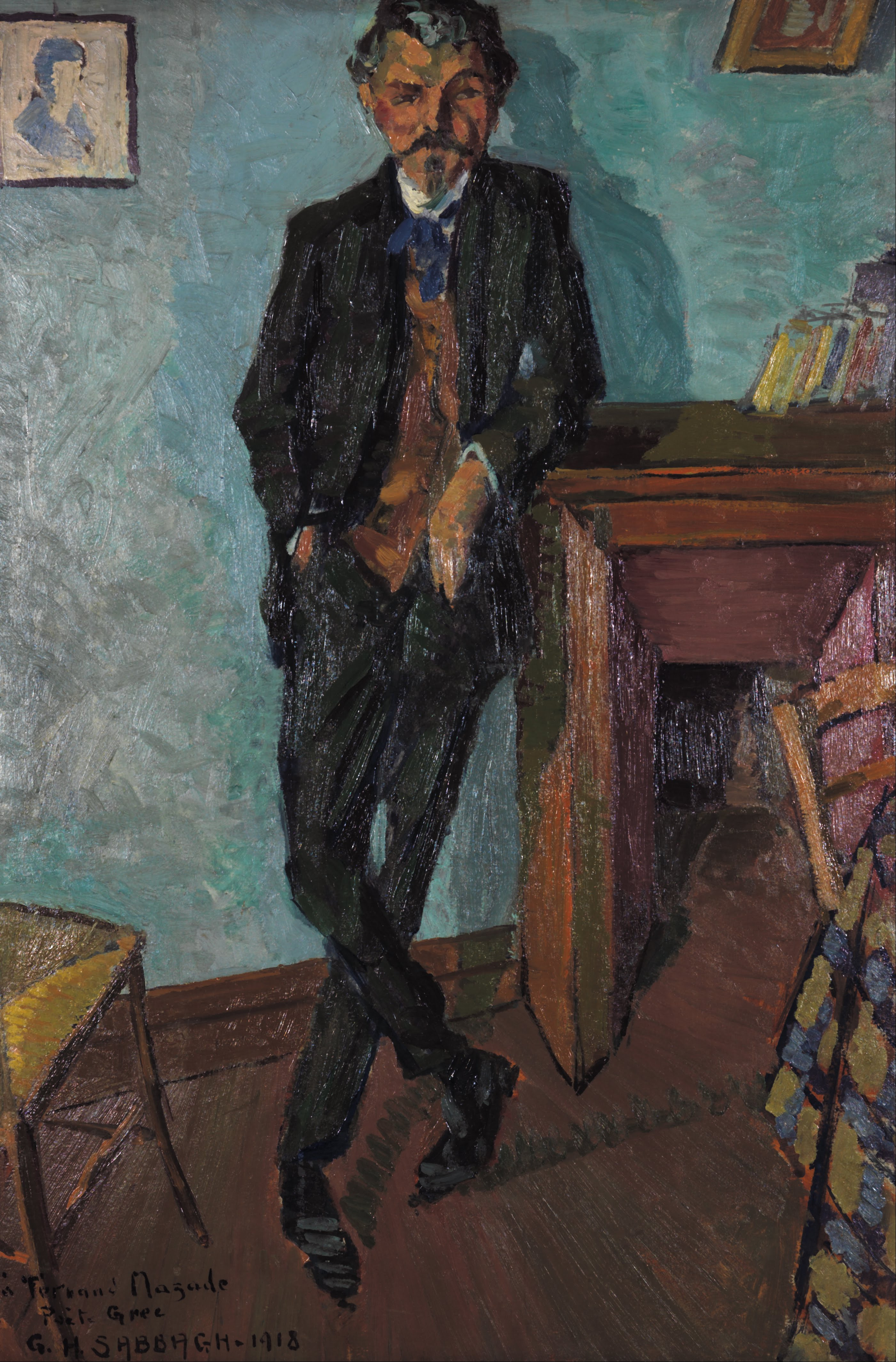
Greek Poet Fernand Mazade

Georges Hanna Sabbagh was born on 10 August 1887, at Alexandria, to a family of Syrian and Lebanese descent.

He studied art in Paris, being the first Egyptian student at the École du Louvre. He was a pupil of Paul Sérusier, Félix Vallotton and the symbolist painter Maurice Denis. It can be said that he was attached to the artists of the Paris School, he worked beside Amedeo Modigliani but he always refused to be considered one of them, keeping his independence and freedom.

He taught at the Académie Ranson in Paris; and starting in 1926, at the School of Fine Arts, Cairo (now Faculty of Fine Arts, Helwan University).

His family and the region of Brittany (where his children were born) provided him with subjects for many of his paintings, before trips to Egypt led him to rediscover the lights, landscapes and characters of his childhood. He excelled in portraits, nudes and landscapes both in France and in Egypt and was enchanted by the old districts of Cairo. A painter of talent, Georges Sabbagh forms one of the group of artists who Jean Cassou called "the sacrificed generation" (along with Henri de Waroquier and Jules-Émile Zingg) - absorbing the school of Les Nabis, Fauvism and Cubism at the beginning of the century, but forgotten after the Second World War. Cassou describes him as a "cordial and deeply human painter". He was able to create in the end of his career a new attitude towards realism.

He served in the British Army in the First World War. He was made a Chevalier of the Legion of Honour (1928).

After his death, his son Jean and daughter-in-law Monique made a retrospective exhibition of his work, and an art catalogue.

== Personal life ==
In 1916, he married the art historian Agnès Humbert, by whom he had two children: the television producer and director Pierre Sabbagh, and the sub-mariner and advisor to General Charles de Gaulle, Jean Sabbagh.

Georges and Agnès divorced in 1934.

== Works ==
This is a partial list of the works of Sabbagh

- Fernand Mazade, 1918, Mathaf: Arab Museum of Modern Art, Doha
- Allégorie de la paix, 1918, Musée de la Princerie, Verdun (Meuse)
- Synthèse de Ploumanac'h, 1920, Musée départemental de l'Oise, Beauvais
- La chapelle de la Clarté, 1920, Musée des Années Trente, Boulogne-Billancourt
- Les Sabbagh à la Clarté, 1920, Musée National d'Art Moderne, Paris
- La robe bleue, 1920, Musée départemental Maurice Denis "The Priory", Saint-Germain-en-Laye
- Maternités arabes, 1920-1921, Mathaf: Arab Museum of Modern Art, Doha
- Les Sabbagh à Paris, 1921, Museum of Grenoble
- Le nu à la fourrure, 1921, Musée des Années Trente
- Portrait of Johannes Tielrooy, 1921, Nederlands Letterkundig Museum, The Hague
- Vénus Anadyomène, 1922, Musée des Années Trente
- L'Été, 1922, Musée des Années Trente
- Le jugement de Pâris, 1923, Musée de Rio de Janeiro
- La Creuse de Crozant, 1925, Mairie de Crozant
- Assouan, 1930, Gezira Center for Modern Art, Cairo
- Le couvent copte de Saint-Siméon, 1930
- Marine, 1931, Musée des Beaux-Arts André Malraux, Le Havre

== Bibliography ==
- Jean Sabbagh and Pierre Sabbagh, Georges Sabbagh, Paris, J. Sabbagh, 1981 ISBN 2-903640-00-9
- Jean Sabbagh with Monique Sabbagh, Mathide Sabbagh and Marc Sabbagh, Georges Sabbagh, Peintures-Aquarelles-Dessins (Paintings-Watercolours-Drawings), preface by Monique Sabbagh and Emmanuel Bréon, Paris, Editions du Panama ISBN 2-7557-0149-8
