= Poisoned cup =

Poisoned cup may refer to:

- a kind of forced suicide
- Trial of Socrates
- Poisoned cup (novel), a novel by Joseph Drew
