= Catherine Langeais =

French television presenter and actress

- Born: Marie-Louise Terrasse; 9 August 1923; Valence, France
- Died: 23 April 1998 (aged 74); Mantes-la-Jolie, France
- Occupation: Speakerine
- Spouse: Pierre Sabbagh

Catherine Langeais, born Marie-Louise Terrasse, (9 August 1923 in Valence, Drôme – 23 April 1998 in Mantes-la-Jolie, Yvelines), was a French television presenter and actress.

== Biography ==
Her father was André Terrasse (1890–1951), an economic journalist and secretary to the Alliance démocratique, and her mother was Marthe Brossette, daughter of François Brossette, mayor of Givors. The family lived in Paris from 1933.

On 28 January 1938, at the age of fourteen, when Marie-Louise was at a school dance, she was introduced by her brother to the politician and future president of the French Republic François Mitterrand. In March 1940, in spite of her youth, they became engaged, but they separated on 15 January 1942, when the Germans occupied France. During that time he sent her more than 300 letters and poems. Then in 1944 Mitterrand married Danielle Gouze whom he met in a resistance network, and Marie-Louise married a Polish count Antoine Gordowski, with whom they had two children, Jean-Michel and Élisabeth. They separated in 1949 and divorced in 1954.

== Television ==
Initially recruited to present the programmes of the new national television network RTF in 1949, Catherine Langeais was probably the most popular lady presenter (speakerine) of French television, from the end of the 1950s through the 1970s. It was she who welcomed BBC viewers in the first international on-line television broadcast, the Franco-British week of July 1952, thanks to the new conversion standard which was to allow, a year later, the international broadcast of the Coronation of Queen Elizabeth II, and later the inauguration of the Eurovision song contest.

In parallel with introducing programmes, Catherine Langeais took part in diverse light entertainment programmes in the years 1950–1960, such as "C'est arrivé à 36 chandelles" and "La séquence du spectateur" (later renamed "La séquence du téléspectateur"), as well as the cookery programme "Art et magie de la cuisine" with the chef Raymond Oliver.

A chronic illness, which she concealed for a long time, made the job difficult but did not prevent her from working until 1955. Patiently, although ill, she continued with her programmes ("A vous de juger", "La séquence du téléspectateur", and some children's programmes). On Sunday 5 January 1975, she emotionally closed the broadcasts of the first channel (ORTF), which was replaced the next day with the new public company Télévision Française 1 (TF1) in which she did no more than the voice-overs of the "La séquence du téléspectateur", while her husband Pierre Sabbagh was director of programmes for the second channel.

In 1987, François Mitterrand presented her with the Legion of Honour award for her undeniable imprint on the history of French television.

== Personal life ==
She married television producer and director Pierre Sabbagh, creator in 1949 of the first daily television news channel in the world. They had no children.

She died from multiple sclerosis on April 23rd, 1998 and was buried in Valmondois cemetery near Paris.

== Biography ==
A biography was written by her nephew

- Terrasse, Jean-Marc, Catherine Langeais, la Fiancée des Français, Paris, Fayard, 2003 ISBN 978-2-213-60962-1

== Filmography ==
Actress:

- Pourquoi viens-tu si tard? (1959)
- All the Gold in the World (1961)
- Par-dessus le mur (1961)
- Un clair de lune à Maubeuge (1962)
- Le Scandale (1967) (uncredited)

As herself:

- La Séquence du spectateur (1953) (narrator in TV series)
- C'est arrivé à 36 chandelles (1957)
