= Art et magie de la cuisine =

- Genre: Cooking show
- Presented by: Raymond Oliver; Catherine Langeais
- Country of origin: France
- Original language: French
- No. of series: 14

Production
- Running time: 30 minutes

Original release
- Network: RTF
- Release: 6 December 1954 – 15 April 1967

Related
- La vérité est au fond de la marmite

Art et magie de la cuisine is a French television cooking show which was created by the chef Raymond Oliver, and co-presented by Catherine Langeais.

The show was broadcast from December 6, 1954, to 1967 on RTF.

== Origins ==
In 1953, RTF asked Raymond Oliver, the French chef and owner of Le Grand Véfour restaurant, to host with Catherine Langeais a program entitled Art et magie de la cuisine.
