= Groupe du musée de l'Homme =

Movement of the French Resistance to the German occupation

The Groupe du musée de l'Homme (French pronunciation: [ɡʁup dy myze də lɔm], lit. 'Group of the Museum of Man') was a movement in the French resistance to the German occupation during the Second World War.

In July 1940, after the Appeal of 18 June from Charles de Gaulle, a resistance group was created by intellectuals and academics led by Anatole Lewitsky and Boris Vildé, along with Paul Hauet. They were not Gaullists; since they were prisoners of war (Vildé escaped on 5 July and Lewitsky was freed in August), it is highly improbable that they had heard de Gaulle's broadcast. However, once Gaullist propaganda took hold, with its message of escape from dishonour, the group fell in with it. Germaine Tillion said, "I do not remember from what date we started to call ourselves Gaullists: it was not at the beginning at any rate. But we did consider General de Gaulle to be right, or at least to be a man who thought as we did. But we knew nothing about him". They were joined by other groups in September. Raymond Burgard, René Iché, Claude Aveline, Marcel Abraham, Jean Cassou (who launched the newspaper Résistance), René-Yves Creston, Germaine Tillion and her mother, Émilie Tillion, were also part of the network.

To prevent their meetings from attracting the attention of the Germans and the French police, they set up a "literary society", Les amis d'Alain-Fournier (The Friends of Alain-Fournier).

== Members of the group ==
- Marcel Abraham
- Jules Andrieu, shot in February 1942 (Mont-Valérien, Suresnes)
- Claude Aveline (1901–1992)
- Jean Blanzat
- Jacqueline Bordelet
- Pierre Brossolette, (1903- died in detention in 1944 / 22.3.1944)
- Raymond Burgard, beheaded in 1944 (in Cologne / Köln), also a member of the Combat Zone North
- Jean-Paul Carrier
- Jean Cassou, launched the newspaper Résistance (1897–1986)
- René-Yves Creston, ethnologist and Breton nationalist
- Christiane Desroches Noblecourt
- Colette Duval (Colette Vivier)
- Jean Duval
- René-Georges Étienne
- Valentin Feldman
- Marcel Fleisser (-1945)
- Jeanne Goupille
- Jean Hamburger
- Colonel Paul Hauet, co-founder of the network, died during deportation / died in the KZ Neuengamme
- Daniel Héricault
- Agnès Humbert, deported
- René Iché
- Georges Ithier, shot in February 1942 (Mont-Valérien, Suresnes)
- Jean Jaudel (1910–2006)
- Albert Jubineau
- (Colonel) Charles de La Rochère died in Sonnenburg
- (Comte) Jehan de Launoy
- Michel Leiris
- Sylvette Leleu
- Renée Lévy
- Anatole Lewitsky, shot in February 1942 (Mont-Valérien, Suresnes), adjunct to Vildé
- Suzanne Lhuillier
- Éveline Lot-Falck
- (Capitain) Ernest Massip
- Marie-Josette Massip
- Thérèse Massip
- Jaques Monod
- Léon Maurice Nordmann, shot in February 1942 (Mont-Valérien, Suresnes)
- Yvonne Oddon
- Jean Paulhan
- Maguy Perrier
- Germaine Quoniam
- Paul Rivet
- René Sanson
- Colette Sanson
- René Sénéchal, shot in February 1942 (Mont-Valérien, Suresnes)
- Alice Simmonet
- Henri Simmonet
- Emilie Tillion, died while being deported to Ravensbrück in 1945
- Germaine Tillion, head of the adjunct network around Hauet with the rank of commandant from 1941 to 1942, deported to Ravensbrück
- Boris Vildé, co-founder and leader of the network, shot in February 1942 (Mont-Valérien, Suresnes)
- Pierre Walter, shot in February 1942 (Mont-Valérien, Suresnes)
- Henri Waquet
- André Weil-Curriel
- Therese de Liniers ?
- Geneviève de Gaulle-Anthonioz ?

== Bibliography ==
- AERI, La Résistance en Ile de France, DVD-Rom, 2004 (fiches Jean Cassou, René Iché, Germaine Tillion).
- Martin Blumenson, Le Réseau du Musée de l'Homme, Éditions Le Seuil, Paris, 1979.
- Sean Carroll, Brave Genius: A Scientist, A Philosopher, and their Daring Adventures from the French Resistance to the Nobel Prize, Crown Publishers, New York, 2013.
- Agnès Humbert, Résistance: A Woman's Journal of Struggle and Defiance in Occupied France, translated by Barbara Mellor, Bloomsbury, New York, 2008.
- Alan Riding, And the Show Went On: Cultural Life in Nazi-Occupied Paris, Alfred A. Knopf, New York, 2010 (chapter six, "Resistance as an Idea," on the musée de l'Homme group).

== External links (French) ==
- Le musée de l'Homme on the site Chemins de Mémoire
- L'histoire du réseau du musée de l'Homme
- Site du musée Boris Vildé
