= Michel Oliver =

French chef

- Born: 2 November 1932 (age 92); Bordeaux, France
- Occupation: Chef
- Family: Raymond Oliver

Michel Oliver (born November 2, 1932) is a French chef. Oliver is the son of Raymond Oliver. Michel Oliver is best known for presenting the cooking television show, La vérité est au fond de la marmite.

== Personal life ==
Oliver has a daughter, Clémentine, a son Bruno and a grandson Aleksandre, who are all professional chefs.

== Bibliography ==
- La cuisine est un jeu d'enfants (préface de Jean Cocteau), Plon, Paris, 1963
- La pâtisserie est un jeu d'enfants, Paris, Plon, 1964, couv. ill. en coul., in-4 (32 x 25 cm) à spirale de 96 pages (chaque recette est illustrée de dessins en couleurs)
- Les hors-d'œuvre sont un jeu d'enfants, 1965.
- Mes recettes, Plon, 1975.
- Mes recettes à la télévision, 1980.
- Mes nouvelles recettes à la télévision, 1982.
- Toute la cuisine de Michel Oliver, encyclopédie en 10 vol. 1982–85.
- Ma cuisine d'été, 1984.
- Mes dernières recettes à la télévision, 1985.
- La méthode Michel Oliver (Michel Oliver et Shigueru Uemura), Michel Lafon, 1986.
- Ma bonne cuisine française, 1987.
- Toutes mes recettes, 1993.
- Croque-bonheur : le dictionnaire du bien-être, 1995.
- La cuisine est un jeu de grands enfants, 1995.
- Les confitures sont un jeu d'enfants, 2000.
- Le rire du chat qui pisse sur la braise, La Tour d'Aigues, Éditions de l'Aube, 2010.
