= Jules-Émile Zingg =

French painter

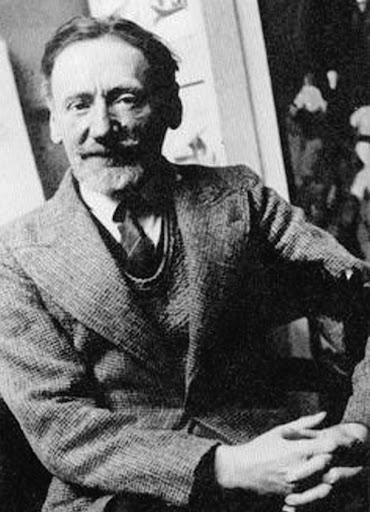
Jules-Émile Zingg (date unknown)

Jules-Émile Zingg (25 August 1882– 4 May 1942) was a French Modernist painter, known for his rural scenes. Other themes of his work included figures, genre scenes, landscapes and, landscapes with figures.

== Biography ==
Jules-Émile Zingg was born on 25 August 1882, in Montbéliard, Doubs, in the mountainous Jura area of Eastern France. He was the son of a clockmaker and woodcutter. He started drawing at age four. There he began to paint the peasants and countryside. He studied the design of clocks before winning a scholarship to study at the Beaux-Arts school in Besançon under Félix-Henri Giacomotti in 1901. After a year he won a scholarship to study in Paris at the École des Beaux-Arts in the studio of Fernand Cormon.

He won second place in the Prix de Rome. His work was accepted at the Salon de Artistes Français. He studied with Paul Cézanne, who became a major influence on his work. After World War I he began to exhibit at the Salon des Indépendants and the Salon d'Automne in a modernist style. At Perros-Guirec in Brittany he met the founders of Les Nabis: Maurice Denis, Paul Sérusier and Georges Hanna Sabbagh.

In the 1920s, he exhibited frequently in Paris. In 1930 he was named a Knight in the Legion of Honor. In 1937 he was awarded the Grand Prize at the Exposition Universelle. He designed tapestries for the Aubusson and Gobelin factories. He became vice-president of the society dedicated to the art of fresco painting, and about 1925 decorated with frescoes the columns of the famous Montparnasse brasserie, La Coupole.

His work is to be found in many museum collections including the Musée d'Art Moderne de Paris, as well as museums in Besançon and other French towns. Retrospective exhibitions of his work have been held at the Musée des Beaux-Arts de Pont-Aven and in Paris at the Musée Bourdelle (1990). After World War I one of his pupils was Claude Génisson.

Twenty works were exhibited at the museum of Cosne-sur-Loire, thanks to a donation from Emile Loiseau in 1970, including his own portrait by Zingg.

Zingg died in Paris on 4 May 1942.

== Selected paintings ==
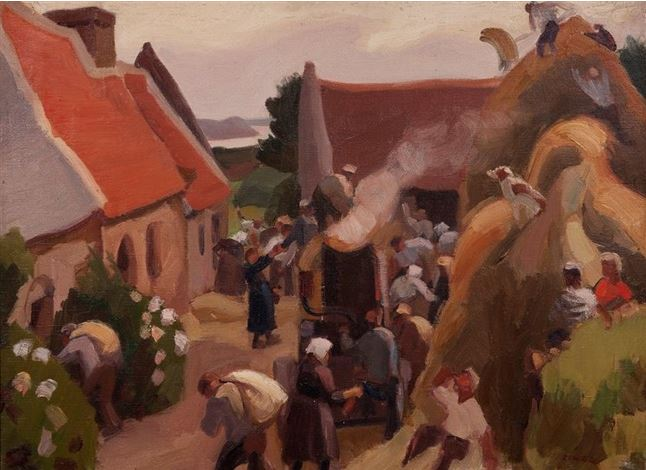
Threshing Wheat

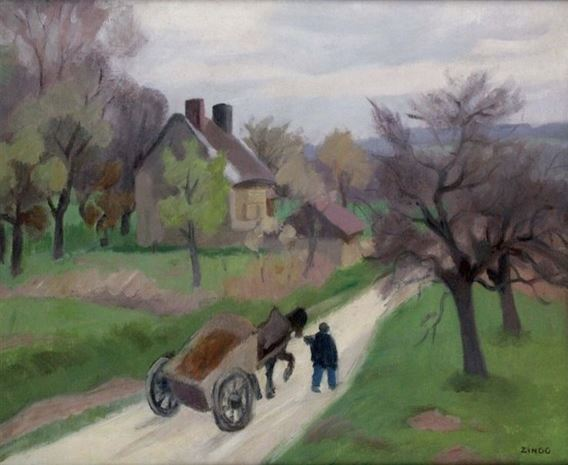
A Cart on the Road in Lorraine

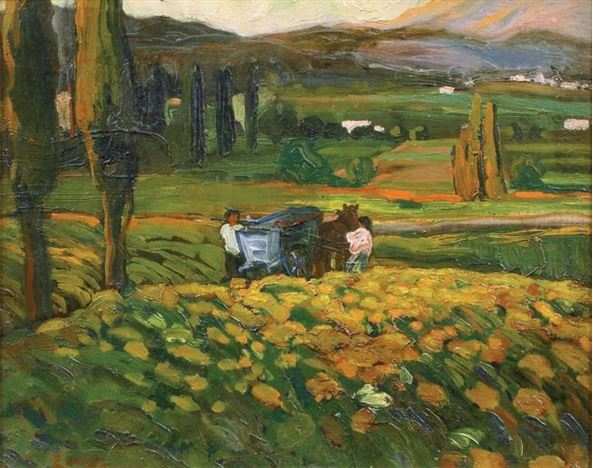
Working in the Fields

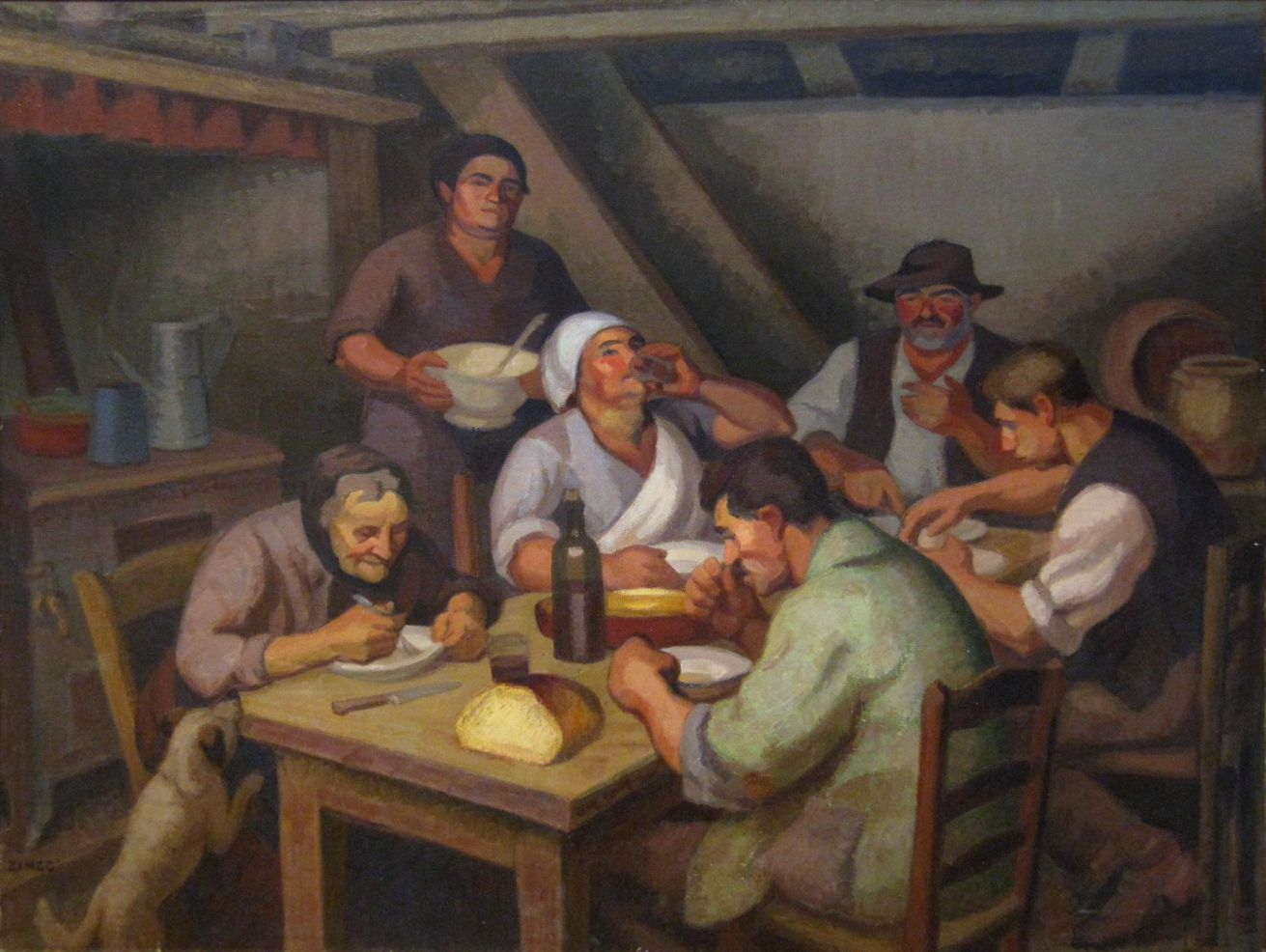
The Peasants' Meal
