= Yvonne Oddon =

French Resistance member and library reformer

Yvonne Oddon (1902–1982) was one of the leaders in the reformation of French libraries and a member of the French Resistance in World War II.

== Biography ==
Yvonne Oddon was born in Gap, Hautes-Alpes to a Protestant family. After secondary school studies and a year as a lecturer in Wales, she was admitted to the school of Library Studies in Paris built after World War I with the help of American aid. She there became an assistant and in 1926-1928 went on a training course to the United States. On her return to France in 1929 she became a librarian at the Trocadéro Museum in the Palais de Chaillot while continuing her activity in the Council of Librarians and Association of French Librarians. Her name remains attached to the Guide du bibliothécaire amateur (Guide for the amateur librarian), published in 1930 by Charles-Henri Bach; and this with the text revised and corrected became the Petit guide du bibliothécaire being considerably added to after 1945 and republished under two names with certain editions being illustrated. The Trocadéro Museum became the Musée de l'Homme, and its library, open to the public and methodically classified (according to an adaptation of the classification of the Library of Congress) represents a turning point in study library management. For the Universal Exhibition of 1947 she was given the task of organising the Libraries section.

== French Resistance ==
Yvonne Oddon was an early resister of German occupation of France in the Second World War. While serving as the Head Librarian of the musée de l'Homme, she had sent books and clothing to French prisoners of war. With Lucie Boutillier du Rétail, Oddon helped prisoners escape and find shelter and food as well as safe haven.

In 1940 she took part, with Boris Vildé and Agnès Humbert, in the creation of a resistance group called the Groupe du musée de l'Homme, initially to help prisoners and aviators to escape. She was also present at the birth of a clandestine newspaper named Résistance. On 10 February 1941 the participants of the group were arrested following their denunciation by an employee. On 7 February 1942, the six men in the group were sentenced to death, but for the three women, including Yvonne Oddon, the sentence was suspended and they were deported to Germany. Yvonne went to several prisons before being sent to the camp at Ravensbrück on 20 November 1944. Freed by the International Red Cross, she arrived back in Paris on 14 April 1945 as part of an exchange negotiated between the Red Cross and Heinrich Himmler.

== Post-war ==
After the war, Yvonne Oddon, while continuing her work at the Musée de l'Homme, took part in numerous missions under the aegis of UNESCO (Haïti, 1949) and took part in the organisation of education conferences based in Malmö in 1950 and in Ibadan in 1954; then the creation of the International Council of Museums, for which she made a classification system; and she took part, after her retirement, in numerous missions, particularly to the Museum centre in Jos, Nigeria.

Immediately after the war, Odon compiled the collection “Chansons de prisonnières”, which includes songs she and her fellow prisoners had written in the German prisons of Anrath, Lübeck, and Cottbus, as well as in the Parisian prisons of Cherche-Midi and La Santé. Composed of original lyrics set to well-known existing melodies, these songs bear witness—often with humor—to the harsh realities of imprisonment, but above all to the powerful hope for freedom that these women held dear.

She was awarded the rank of Chevalier (Légion d'honneur) for her resistance work and was later promoted to Officier.

She died in 1982, and was buried at Menglon (Drôme), the cradle of her family.

== See also ==
- Georges Henri Rivière
