= Erotissimo =

1969 film by Gérard Pirès

- Directed by: Gérard Pirès
- Written by: Gérard Pirès; Nicole de Buron; Pierre Sisser
- Produced by: Pierre Braunberger
- Starring: Annie Girardot; Jean Yanne
- Cinematography: Jean-Marc Ripert
- Edited by: Françoise Berger-Garnault
- Music by: William Sheller
- Distributed by: Compagnie Commerciale Française Cinématographique (CCFC)
- Release date: 1969
- Running time: 100 minutes
- Countries: France; Italy
- Language: French

Erotissimo is a 1969 French-Italian comedy film directed by Gérard Pirès. It was entered into the 19th Berlin International Film Festival.

== Cast ==
- Annie Girardot as Annie
- Jean Yanne as Philippe
- Francis Blanche as Le polyvalent (Tax controller)
- Dominique Maurin as Bernard
- Didi Perego as Chantal
- Erna Schürer as Sylvie
- Venantino Venantini as Sylvio
- Jacques Higelin as Bob
- Rufus as The Accountant
- Uta Taeger as Jeanne
- Louisa Colpeyn as La mère d'Annie / Mother (as Luisa Colpeyn)
- Nicole Croisille as Florence
- Serge Gainsbourg as L'individu louche / Confusing guy
- Daniel Prévost as The seller
- Jacques Martin as The seller
- Anne-Marie Peysson as La femme qui lit 'La Croix'
