= Anne-Marie Peysson =

French journalist (1935–2015)

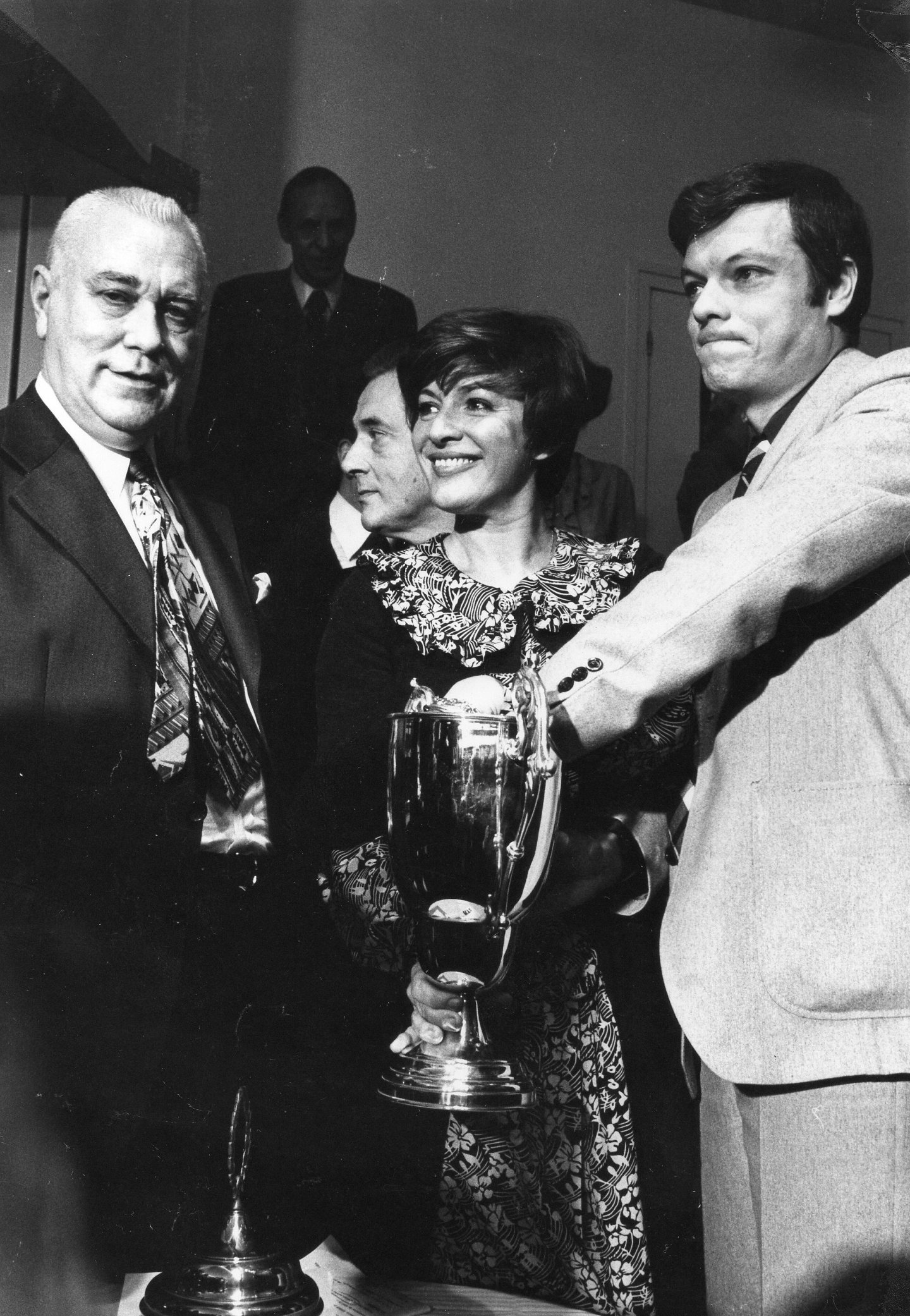
- Anne-Marie Peysson, with François Jouvenet and Fabrice, during a draw for the 1977–78 Coupe de France.
- Born: 24 July 1935; Saint-Disdier, France
- Occupations: Writer, presenter

Anne-Marie Marguerite Peysson, (July 24, 1935 - April 14, 2015) was a French presenter and journalist. She is best known for presenting La vérité est au fond de la marmite.

== Filmography ==
- 1969 : The Unfaithful Wife
- 1969 : Erotissimo

Anne-Marie Peysson in 1958
