= All the Gold in the World =

1961 film directed by René Clair

- Film poster
- French: Tout l'or du monde
- Directed by: René Clair
- Written by: René Clair; Jean Marsan; Jacques Rémy
- Produced by: René Clair; Guido Giambartolomei; Georges Lourau; Jacques Plante; Angelo Rizzoli
- Starring: Bourvil; Alfred Adam; Philippe Noiret
- Cinematography: Pierre Petit
- Edited by: Louisette Hautecoeur
- Music by: Georges Van Parys
- Production companies: Cineriz; Filmsonor; Royal Film; S.E.C.A.
- Distributed by: Cinédis
- Release date: 1 November 1961
- Running time: 90 minutes
- Countries: France; Italy
- Language: French

All the Gold in the World (French: Tout l'or du monde) is a 1961 French-Italian comedy film directed by René Clair and starring Bourvil, Alfred Adam and Philippe Noiret.

It was shot at the Billancourt Studios in Paris. The film's sets were designed by Léon Barsacq.

== Cast ==
- Bourvil as Dumont and his sons: Mathieu, 'Toine, Martial
- Alfred Adam as Alfred
- Philippe Noiret as Victor Hardy
- Claude Rich as Fred
- Colette Castel as Stella
- Annie Fratellini as Rose
- Max Elloy as the country guard
- Jean Marsan as speaker
- Pascal Mazzotti as speaker
- Albert Michel as Mayor of Cabosse
- Michel Modo as Tony
- Françoise Dorléac as journalist
- Yves Barsacq as photographer
- Paul Bisciglia as photographer
- Robert Burnier as magazine's director
- Catherine Langeais as speaker
- René Hell as notary
- Georges Bever
- Christian Marin as television stage manager
- Paul Mercey as Léon Truc - guard in prison
- Bernard Musson as villager
- Paul Préboist as picnicker
- Robert Rollis as motorist
