= Jean Sabbagh =

French admiral (1917–2006)

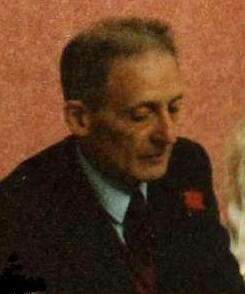
Sabbagh in 1984

Jean Sabbagh (23 January 1917 – 1 October 2006) was a French contre-amiral and advisor to General Charles de Gaulle.

== Life ==
Jean Charles Sabbagh was born in Paris, the elder son of artist Georges Hanna Sabbagh and art historian and resistance heroine Agnès Humbert.

Jean Sabbagh became an ensign in the French navy in 1939, and in 1940 was on board the gunboat Ville-d'Ys when it was sent by the Vichy government to "protect" Saint Pierre and Miquelon from the British. He was a lieutenant later that year when the same boat was disarmed at Martinique. He became capitaine de corvette in 1953, and was the first commandant of the fast frigate Le Provençal from 1958 to 1960.

Promoted capitaine de frégate in 1960, he became advisor to General de Gaulle from 1965 to1967, then Commandant of the Naval School (and the school of Naval pupil-officers ) from 1967-1969.

After he was named contre-amiral (in 1971) President Pompidou appointed him in 1973 as Alternate Advisor to the Court of State Security. He was head of the division of international relations for the Chief of the Defence Staff from 1973-1975, and senior consultant of foreign commerce in 1975.

With his wife Monique and other members of his family, Jean Sabbagh wrote a retrospective appreciation of the work of his father Georges Hanna Sabbagh, including a catalogue of his paintings and drawings.

In 1986 Jean Sabbagh, with his knowledge of submarines and the war, collaborated in the translation into French of two books by Tom Clancy: The Hunt for Red October as Octobre rouge, and Red Storm Rising as Tempête rouge.

== Family ==
Jean Sabbagh married Monique Le Bidois in April 1941 and they had five children: Yves, Armelle (Mme Henri Sentilhes), Marc, Antoine and Pauline (Mme Pascal Rambaud). Sabbagh's brother was television producer Pierre Sabbagh, and he was the cousin and lifelong friend of architect Jane Drew.

== Bibliography ==
- (in French) Clancy, Tom, Octobre rouge, (tr. of The Hunt for Red October by Marianne Veron, with the collaboration of Jean Sabbagh), Paris, Editions Albin Michel, 1986
- (in French) Clancy, Tom, Tempête rouge, (tr. of Red Storm Rising by France-Marie Watkins, with the collaboration of Jean Sabbagh), Paris, Editions Albin Michel, 1987 ISBN 2-226-03003-4
- (in French) Lescallier, Daniel, Traité pratique de gréement des vaissaux et autres bâtiments de mer, preface by Capt. Jean Sabbagh, 1968
- (in French) Jean Sabbagh and Pierre Sabbagh, Georges Sabbagh, Paris, J. Sabbagh, 1981 ISBN 2-903640-00-9
- (in French) Jean Sabbagh, Monique Sabbagh, Mathilde Sabbagh and Marc Sabbagh, Georges Sabbagh, Peintures-Aquarelles-Dessins (Paintings-Watercolours-Drawings), preface by Monique Sabbagh and Emmanuel Bréon, Paris, Editions du Panama, 2006 ISBN 2-7557-0149-8 includes English translation by Lisa Davidson
