= Pierre Sabbagh =

French television journalist (1918–1994)

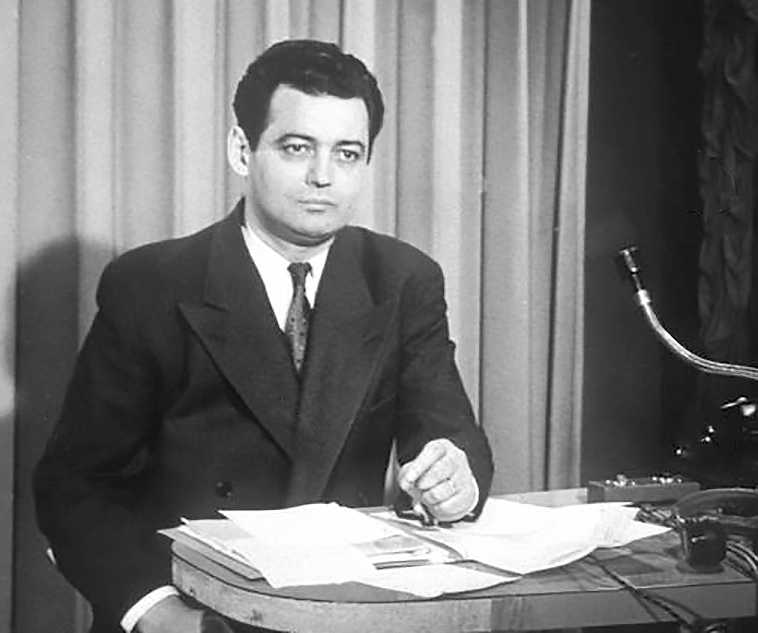
- Sabbagh in 1949, presenting the first French television news broadcast.
- Born: 18 July 1918; Lannion, France
- Died: 30 September 1994 (aged 76); Paris, France
- Occupations: Journalist, news anchor
- Spouse: Catherine Langeais (m. 1954)
- Children: 2
- Parents: Georges Hanna Sabbagh (father); Agnès Humbert (mother)
- Relatives: Jean Sabbagh (brother)

Pierre Sabbagh (18 July 1918 – 30 September 1994) was a major personality in French television, as a journalist, producer and director.

== Early life ==
Pierre Alain Sabbagh was born in Lannion (Côtes-d'Armor) on 18 July 1918. He was the younger son of the artist Georges Hanna Sabbagh and the art historian and resistance heroine Agnès Humbert. His brother was naval officer Jean Sabbagh.

== War correspondent ==
Pierre Sabbagh became a war correspondent in the hope of finding his mother Agnès in World War II. He had visited her in Fresnes Prison and the Prison de la Santé in 1942, a few days before she was deported by the Nazis, sentenced to slave labour in Germany. In 1944, he travelled into Germany behind the advancing American army, but did not find her until he returned to Paris in 1945.

== Television ==
Pierre Sabbagh presented and directed the first television news in the world on 29 June 1949.

His greatest success was the creation, in 1966, of the programme "Au théâtre ce soir" ("The Theatre Tonight") following a strike on French television and the success of a Belgian television comedy called "La Bonne planque", which provoked the appetite of the public for this kind of programme: over 300 plays were produced in the series.

He created the first audiovisual game, reuniting France in the 1960s in front of the black-and-white screen: "L'Homme du XXe siècle" ("20th Century Man"), a game of general cultural questions which went on for many years and which finished with the final "Super homme du XXe siècle" ("20th Century Superman") which brought together all the previous winners of whom the comedian, Robert Manuel, beat a professor of complementary medicine, Georges Rivault.

He was Director-General of the television network Antenne 2 between September 1971 and July 1972.

His wife was the French television presenter and actress Catherine Langeais.

== Publications ==
- Pierre Sabbagh, Antoine Graziani, Fanina, paperback, Pan Macmillan, 1965 ISBN 0-330-02040-4
- Pierre Sabbagh, Antoine Graziani (tr. Ellen Hart and Cornelia Brookfield), Fanina, 1966
- Pierre Sabbagh, Antoine Graziani (tr. Marguerite Barnett), Fanina, Child of Rome, hardback, London, Pan Macmillan 1969, ISBN 0-330-02274-1 (also New York, Bantam, 1968)
- Pierre Sabbagh, Le guide de la Pipe et du Tabac, Paris, Stock, 1973
- Pierre Sabbagh, Le guide Marabout de la pipe et du tabac, Paris, Editions Marabout, 1973
- Jean Sabbagh and Pierre Sabbagh, Georges Sabbagh, Paris, J. Sabbagh, 1981 ISBN 2-903640-00-9
- Pierre Sabbagh, Encore vous, Sabbagh!, Paris, Stock, 1984 ISBN 2-234-01775-0

== Filmography ==
- Le second souffle, 1959, film, actor (directed by Yannick Bellon)
- Monsieur Vernet, 1988, television film, director
- La pomme, 1991, television film, director
- Le Noir te va bien, 1991, television film, director
- L'amour fou, 1991, television film, director
