= Faculty of Fine Arts, Helwan University =

Art school in Cairo, Egypt

Faculty of Fine Arts, Capital University is a school of fine arts established in Cairo in 1908. It is now the Faculty of Fine Arts, or art department of the Capital University. It is formerly known as the School of Fine Arts, Cairo, College of Fine Arts in Cairo, or School of Fine Arts in Cairo.

== History ==
The Faculty of Fine Arts was founded by Yusuf Kamal in 1908. More than 150 students were enrolled in the first year. Education was imparted free of charge to students of all nationalities and religions. It offered classes in painting, decoration, sculpture, architecture, and calligraphy. Guillaume Laplagne, a French sculptor established in Egypt, was the school's first director.

The college's students exhibited for the first time in 1911 at the Automobile Club in Cairo. Some consider that this can be considered the first exhibition by Egyptian artists of the century.

It was taken over by the Ministry of Education (Egypt) in 1928.

== See also ==
- Capital University
