= La vérité est au fond de la marmite =

- Genre: Cooking show
- Presented by: Michel Oliver; Anne-Marie Peysson
- Country of origin: France
- Original language: French
- No. of series: 5

Production
- Running time: 30 minutes

Original release
- Network: Antenne 2
- Release: 6 December 1978 – 15 April 1983

La vérité est au fond de la marmite is a French television cooking show, it was created by the chef Michel Oliver.

== Premise ==
Michel Oliver presented a new different recipe every week.
