= Anatole Lewitsky =

French anthropologist (1903–1942)

Anatole Lewitsky (22 August 1903 – 23 February 1942) was a French anthropologist and member of the French Resistance in World War II. He was head of the European-Asiatic department at the Musée de l'Homme, and a world authority on Siberian shamanism.

Lewitsky was born to an Orthodox Christian noble family of a senator of the Russian Empire whose family was exiled after the Russian Revolution. He studied at the Sorbonne and obtained a degree in literature in 1931 before entering the École des Hautes Études. He founded, with Boris Vildé and Yvonne Oddon the resistance group Groupe du musée de l'Homme. He was betrayed, tried and sentenced to death. He was killed by firing squad, together with Léon-Maurice Nordmann, Georges Ithier, Jules Andrieu, René Sénéchal, Pierre Walter and Boris Vildé, on 23 February 1942 at Fort Mont-Valérien. They are buried in the cemetery at Ivry-sur-Seine.
