= Raymond Oliver =

French chef

- Born: 27 March 1909; Langon, Bordeaux, France
- Died: 5 November 1990 (aged 81); Paris, France
- Occupation: Chef
- Children: Michel Oliver
- Culinary career
- Cooking style: Haute cuisine

Raymond Oliver (27 March 1909 – 5 November 1990) was a French chef and owner of Le Grand Véfour restaurant in Paris, one of France's great historical restaurants. Oliver detested nouvelle cuisine, preferring the rich ingredients favored by the chefs in his native Gascony.

Oliver, who was born in Langon in the Bordeaux region of France, was the son and grandson of cooks. His maternal grandmother gave him his first instruction in cooking as a boy, and he began his apprenticeship as a chef under his father at the age of 15.

For more than 35 years, he was the owner of Le Grand Vefour on the Rue de Beaujolais in the Palais-Royal district. His celebrity clientele ranged from statesmen like Winston Churchill and Andre Malraux, to writers including Albert Camus and Georges Simenon, to the industrialists and financiers Henry Ford and David Rockefeller. The Aga Khan, and Prince Rainier and Princess Grace of Monaco were among his appreciative clients, as were Jean Cocteau and Colette.

During World War II, Oliver operated a hotel in the French Alps, organized a Resistance cell, and hid Allied airmen who had been shot down on bombing missions. He sheltered an 11-man American bomber crew until the liberation and was later decorated by Gen. Dwight D. Eisenhower. In 1948, he purchased Le Grand Vefour, a restaurant dating to 1784. Six years after Oliver bought the restaurant, it was awarded the prized third star by the Michelin Guide (France's atlas to good dining), one of only a handful of kitchens that were so honored at that time.

Oliver published La Cuisine, a detailed technical cookbook, in 1967 and hosted a popular cooking show on television called Art et magie de la cuisine. He also served as one of the eleven judges at the Judgment of Paris.

== See also ==
- List of wine personalities
- The Gentleman from Epsom (film, 1962)
