= Joseph Drew =

English newspaper editor

Photo from Views & Reviews: Weymouth & Portland 1895

Joseph Drew (21 May 1814 – 3 December 1883) was an English newspaper editor, steamboat proprietor, art collector, writer and lecturer.

== Life ==
Joseph Drew was born in Deptford, son of Joseph Drew (1779–1846) of the Royal Navy dockyard service and Martha Gale (1781–1854). The family probably came to London from Dorset shortly before Joseph was born, as his elder siblings Sarah and Henry had been baptised in Wyke Regis. Following the shutting down of Deptford Dockyard in 1830, his family moved to Melcombe Regis where he worked in his father's confectionery business. He later started a grocery business (with a partner Joseph Maunders) which went bankrupt. In about 1838 he moved to Guernsey with his wife and their four young children and set up his own confectioners in St. Peter Port, but returned to Weymouth a few years later.

Drew founded the newspaper The Southern Times, published in Weymouth in 1850, which he edited until 1862. For most of his life he was active in local affairs, becoming a JP and town councillor.

In 1852, by reason of his wealth and influence as a newspaper proprietor, Joseph Drew became a partner in the company Cosens & Co. which operated paddle steamers from Weymouth. He became chairman of Cosens in 1874.

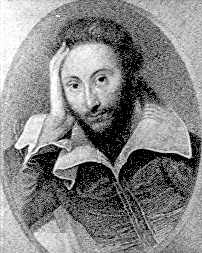
A print after the Zuccari portrait of Shakespeare

Drew was, from 1854, proprietor of the Victoria Hotel (at Augusta Place on Weymouth Esplanade), where in 1857 he opened a refreshment room and art gallery (the Great Western Picture Saloon) displaying his valuable collection of works 'by the great Masters and modern artists'. Drew's collection included 'the equestrian Vandyke' (sic); and there were pencil sketches by Turner, Rembrandt, Rubens, Paolo Veronese, Andrea del Sarto and Titian. Mentioned is 'Danaë and her golden shower'. There were also paintings by Sir David Wilkie, Danby, Niemann, Webster and Wilson. Joseph Drew sold, from his collection, Nicolas Poussin's The Testament of Eudamidas to the Rev. Thomas Mawkes for £2000. In 1859 it was reported that he had purchased a portrait of Shakespeare by 'Zucchero'. Drew's wide knowledge of art and his concern for it is shown in his 1871 address to the British Archaeological Association, Art Treasures and their Preservation, published fully in his Synopsis of Fourteen Popular Lectures.

Joseph Drew died at Weymouth in 1883 and was buried in Melcombe Regis Cemetery. There is a memorial to him, his wife and two children near the west wall of the cemetery.

== Works ==
Drew wrote and lectured on a wide range of subjects in the fields of art, science, history and religion.

In 1851 he strongly criticised Pope Pius IX with an essay Popery against the Pope, an Appeal to Protestants and satirical verse The Vision of the Pope; or A Snooze in the Vatican. These works were prompted by the re-establishment of the Catholic hierarchy in 1850, when the pope created 12 Catholic dioceses in England and appointed diocesan bishops.

He ventured into historical fiction with his short novel The Poisoned Cup, published in many editions between 1853 and 1963. This he described as "a quaint tale of old Weymouth and Sandsfoot Castle in the days of Queen Bess" with a chapter describing the growing suspicions of the conduct of Mary Queen of Scots and the events leading to her imprisonment and later execution by her English cousin Queen Elizabeth.

Drew's last written work, The Rival Queens, factually written in a popular style, is an account of the eventful but troubled life of Mary, and her unhappy fate in the hands of Elizabeth.

Between 1866 and 1872 he delivered a series of free lectures which he described in A Synopsis of Fourteen Popular Lectures. Alongside his two books on Mary Queen of Scots and Queen Elizabeth, he lectured on other royalty of that period: Henry VIII and his second wife Anne Boleyn, and Lady Jane Grey. In 1871 he gave a lecture to the British Archæological Association on Art Treasures and their Preservation.

== Family ==
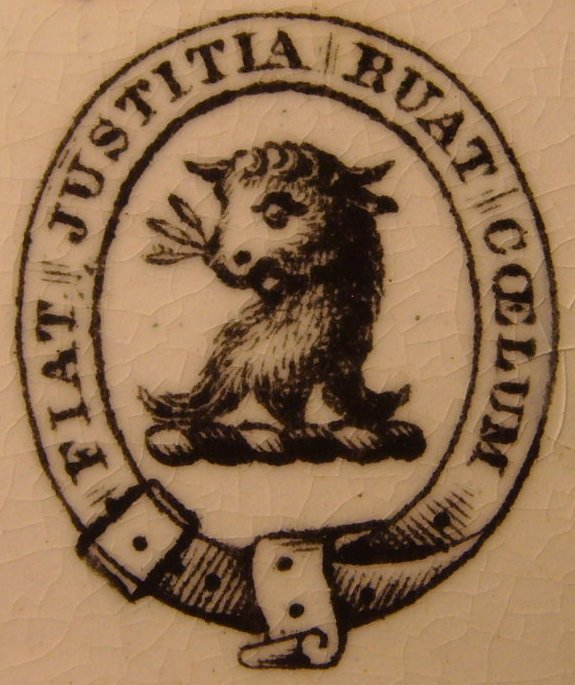
Drew family crest with motto Fiat justitia ruat cœlum

When he was only 18 Joseph Drew married Eliza Monday (1808–1846), six years his senior, at St Bride's Church, Fleet St, London. They had four children: Mary Jessie Drew (1833–1872), Joseph William Drew (1834–1859), Alice Martha Drew (1836–1897) and Fanny Eliza Drew (1839–1871, maternal grandmother of Agnes Humbert). His wife died at the age of 38, and two years later he married her younger sister Caroline Agnes Monday (1820–1893), a school teacher, at St Mary Magdalen Bermondsey, by whom he had two children Caroline Agnes Drew (1850–1933) and musician Harry Drew (1851–1895).

Drew's daughter Fanny Eliza married organist William James Rooke and their daughter Mabel Wells Annie Rooke was the mother of the heroine of the French Resistance Agnès Humbert. Drew's son Harry married missionary teacher Georgiana Down and their son Harry Guy Radcliffe Drew was the father of architect Jane Drew.

== Honours ==
Among his honours were

- Fellow of the Geological Society of London, 1870
- Fellow of the Royal Astronomical Society, 1871
- Fellow of the Royal Historical Society, 1872
- Hon. LL.D. University of Richmond, USA, 1874
- Fellow of the Royal Society of Literature
- Fellow of the Royal Society of Arts
- Fellow of the Literary and Scientific Society

== List of works ==
=== Writings ===
Include poems, essays, lectures, and books.

- Drew, Joseph The Vision of the Pope; or A Snooze in the Vatican, in (satirical) verse. 1851, Weymouth: Benson and Barling, London: Simpkin & Marshall.
- Drew, Joseph Popery against the Pope, an Appeal to Protestants, an essay. 1851, London: Benjamin L. Green, 62 Paternoster Row.
- Drew, Joseph A Biographical Sketch of the Military and Political Career of the late Duke of Wellington, including the most Interesting Particulars of his Death, Lying in State and public funeral (Compiled from the most Authentic Sources), illustrated with engravings. 1851, Weymouth, "printed for the booksellers".

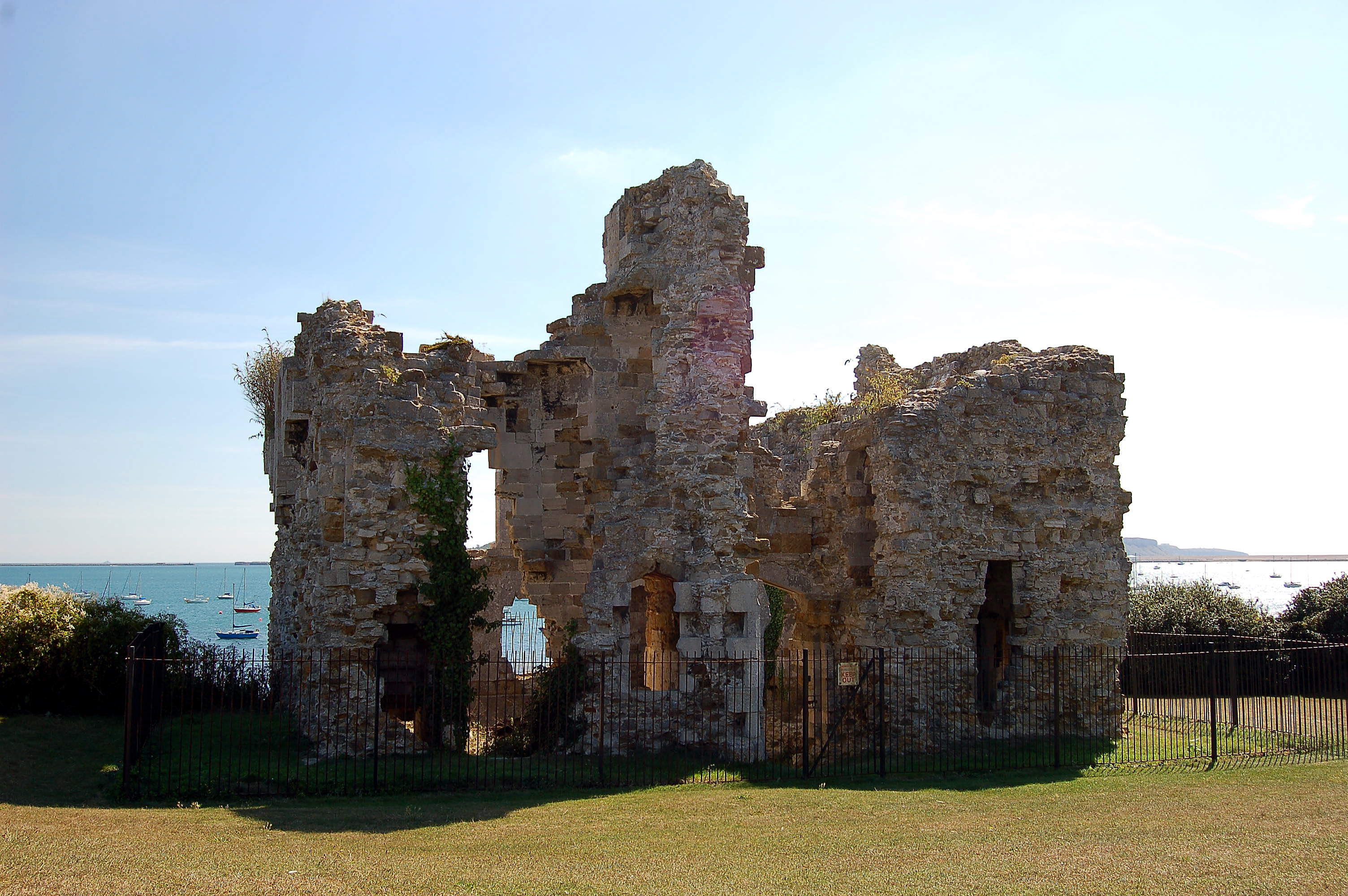
The ruins of the 16th century Sandsfoot Castle

- Drew, Joseph The Poisoned Cup: a quaint tale of old Weymouth and Sandsfoot Castle in the days of Queen Bess. First published in The Southern Times on 25 December 1852, titled A Chronicle of Weymouth and Melcombe in the Days of Elizabeth, or, Christmas in the Olden Time. Many bound editions between 1853 and 1963, with variations in the title. Weymouth: Sherren & Son. Modern editions include photographs of Sandsfoot Castle, the scene of the banquet in the story. ISBN 978-1278132839
- Drew, Joseph The Sea Nymph. Song, music by Daniel Rolls (1853)
- Drew, Joseph The World and how it was made: from the Mosaical text, in verse. 1862, London: Houlston & Wright, and Weymouth: Sherren.
- Drew, Joseph England’s Glory. Mention in title pages of In the Beginning and A Synopsis of Fourteen Popular Lectures. Before 1873, printer and publisher unknown.
- Drew, Joseph Our Home in the Stars, illustrated with engravings. 1872, London: Elliot Stock, Weymouth: T. W. & W. Tarver.
- Drew, Joseph In the Beginning, or Man's First Paradise, in verse. 1872, Weymouth : T. W. & W. Tarver. A revision of his 1862 book The World and how it was made.
- Drew, Joseph A Synopsis of Fourteen Popular Lectures; prepared especially for Working Men's Societies, Young Men's Christian Associations, Mechanic's Institutes, Mental Improvement Societies, etc. by Dr. Joseph Drew, with Press Criticisms of the Same. 1873, Weymouth: T.W. & W. Tarver. The synopsis is followed by the text of his talk on Art Treasures and their Preservation.
  - 1. "Fire, the Baptismal Rite and the funeral shroud of the World”
  - 2. "Trees, Plants and Flowers – their habits and instincts”
  - 3. "The Earthquake and Volcano – their cause and effect”
  - 4. "Man – pre-historic and modern”
  - 5. "Labour, the poor man's Capital”
  - 6. "Lady Jane Grey – her life and what it teaches”
  - 7. "Creation and its Mysteries”
  - 8. "Henry VIII and Anne Boleyn; or the first dawn of the Reformation”
  - 9. "The Philosophy of Death”
  - 10. "Our Home in the Stars”
  - 11. "The theory of Ghosts”
  - 12. "Our Earth from its Cradle to its Grave”
  - 13. "Mary Queen of Scots – her Private History and Public Career”
  - 14. "Let there be Light”
  - Art Treasures and their Preservation, an address delivered before the British Archaeological Association at the meeting of their 29th annual Congress at Weymouth, 23 August 1871.
- Drew, Joseph The Mystery of Creation: a lay sermon 1879, Weymouth: Sherren & Son. Dedicated to "Harry Drew, Mus.Doc., L.Mus., Trin.Col., Lond., by his affectionate Father, Joseph Drew, to keep alive in his remembrance the many pleasant evenings spent in discussing these, and kindred subjects, during his visit home from India."
- Drew, Joseph The Rival Queens. A sketch, historical and biographical. Compiled from state papers, public records, historical works, and other reliable sources of information by Joseph Drew. With special reference to Elizabeth I and Mary Queen of Scots. 1880, Weymouth: Sherren & Son. Dedicated to "Henry Edwards, Esq., M.P. for Weymouth and Melcombe Regis".

=== Patents ===
- Drew, Joseph: British Patent 9069 of 1841: An improved method of rolling and cutting lozenges, and also of cutting gun wads, wafers, and all other similar substances, by means of a certain machine designed by me, and constructed of divers metals and woods. London: Eyre & Spottiswoode. 8 pages with a large insert sheet of technical drawings Figs 1 – 8.
- Drew, Joseph: British Registered Design 7 May 1851, no. 78780: Subject of design: biscuit to be called 'The Motto Ring Biscuits', including a drawing of the biscuit with text WILL YOU MARRY ME.
- Drew, Joseph: British Patent 1508 of 1861: Improvements in the adaptation of plates or shields to fixed and floating batteries, and also ships, for the purpose of more effectually resisting shot or other projectiles. London: Eyre & Spottiswoode. 2 pages.
