= Claude Aveline =

French writer (1901–1992)

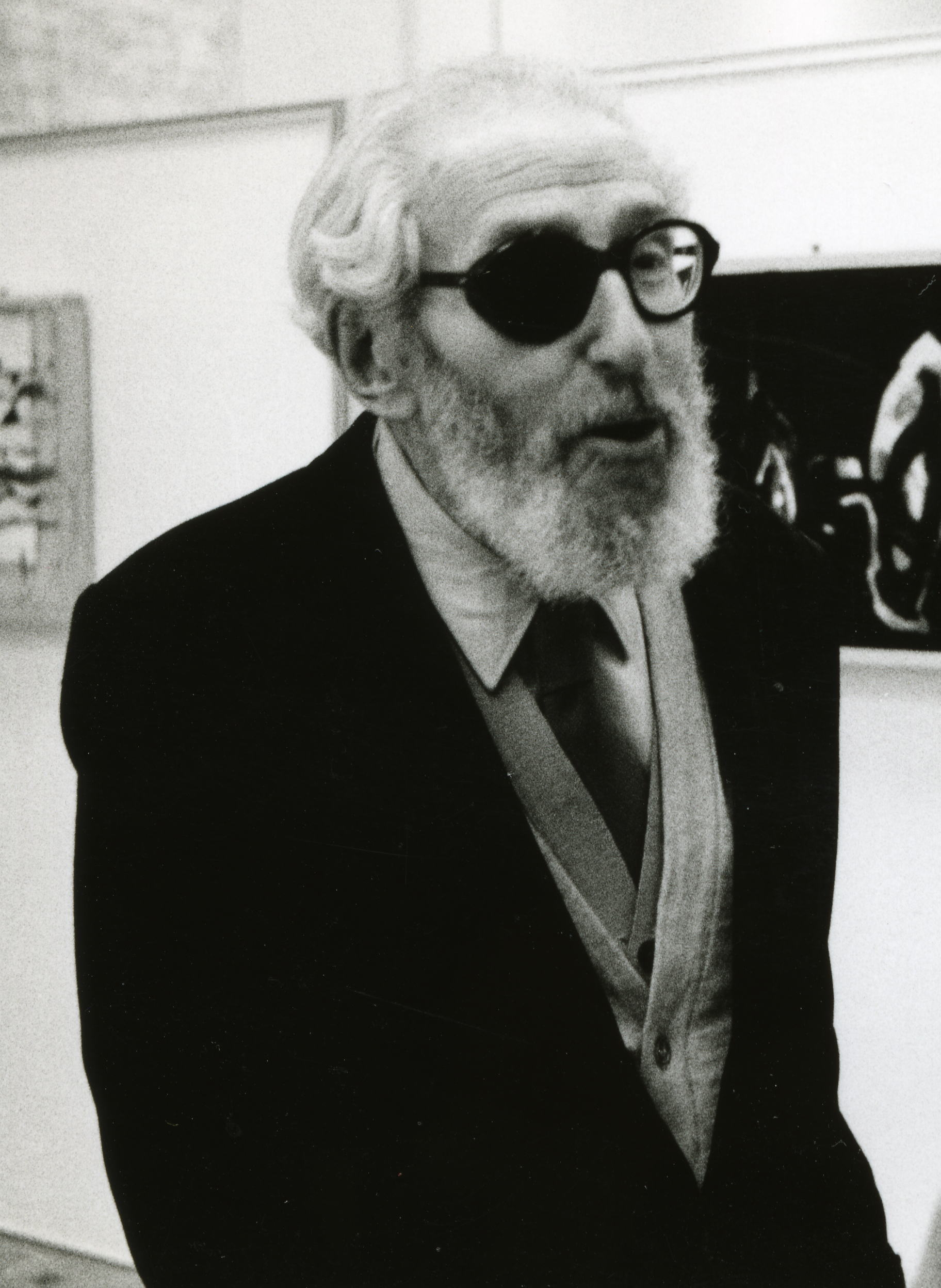
- Claude Aveline in an exhibition opening in 1989.
- Born: Evgen Avtsine; 19 July 1901; Paris, France
- Died: 4 November 1992 (aged 91); Paris, France
- Occupations: Writer, poet
- Writing career
- Pen name: Minervois, Claude Aveline
- Genres: Novel, poetry

Signature
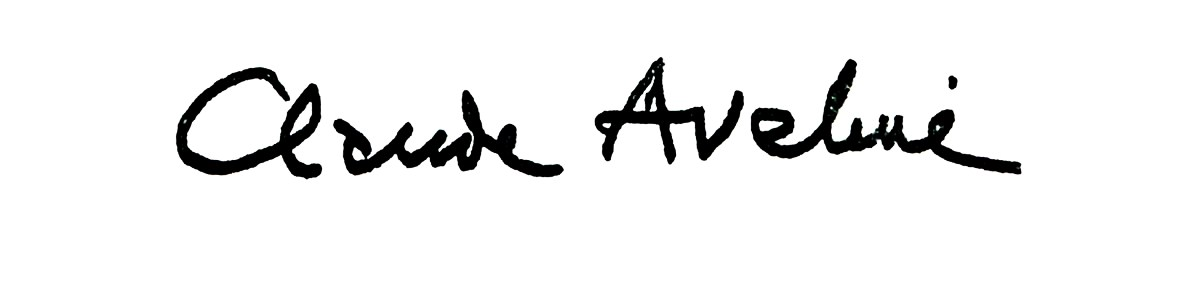

Claude Aveline, pen name of Evgen Avtsine (19 July 1901 – 4 November 1992), was a writer, publisher, editor, poet and member of the French Resistance. Aveline, who was born in Paris, France, has authored numerous books and writings throughout his writing career. He was known as a versatile author, writing novels, poems, screenplays, plays, articles, and sayings.

== Biography ==
He was born to Jewish parents who had fled the racial segregation they were subjected to in Russia, moved to France in 1891 and became French citizens in 1905. Avtsine studied at the prestigious Lycée Henri-IV in Paris and then in a school in Versailles to which his parents moved. In 1915, he volunteered as a medic in the First World War, then went to college in Paris, but his health deteriorated and he had to stop his studies. In 1918 - 1919 he lived near the city of Cannes in southeast France, where he began writing under the pen name Claude Aveline.

== Career ==
In 1919, his poems were published in magazines, and he was introduced to writer Anatole France, becoming his protégé and close friend. In 1920, he returned to Paris, worked as an editor of an art journal, and accepted a request to write a book about Buddha, called "La merveilleuse légende de siddhartha gautama bouddha". In 1922, aged 21, he founded his own publishing house under the name "Chez Claude Aveline éditeur" and was subsequently called "the youngest publisher in France". and even "in the world".

After another health incident in 1923, Aveline stayed four years in a health clinic in Font-Romeu, where he met and befriended a young patient, Jean Vigo, eventually becoming a film director. Aveline would later act both as the executor of the filmmaker's estate, and as the legal guardian of Vigo's daughter after his wife's death; in 1951 Aveline founded the Prix Jean Vigo given to young film directors. He was president of the jury board for twenty-five years. In 1932 he published the detective novel "La Double Mort de Frédéric Belot", which was a public success, and in 1936, the novel "Le Prisonnier". Le Prisonnier has been cited by Albert Camus as an influence and inspiration for his successful novel, L'Étranger. Favoring the left side of the political spectrum, he contributed to the writing of numerous communist and anti-fascist journals and publications, such as Commune and Vendredi.

During the Nazi occupation in World War II Claude Aveline joined the French Resistance. In 1952 he won the Grand Prix of the Société des gens de lettres and the Prix Italia in 1955 for his creative work in radio dramas. In 1956, Aveline asked his many artist friends to artistically illustrate, i.e. draw or paint the Portrait de l'Oiseau-Qui-N'Existe-Pas (Portrait of the bird that doesn't exist), a poem he wrote in 1950, which was subsequently translated into 55 languages. An anthology was made out of 108 portraits by artists of various backgrounds and styles such as Henri-Georges Adam, Atlan, Bertholle, Bissiere, Prassinos, Music, Singier, Vieira da Silva and Jacques Villon. In 1963 Aveline donated it to the Musée National d'Art Moderne in Paris where it was exposed.

His bust, made in 1967 by Ossip Zadkine, was the last sculpture created by Zadkine before his death. Aveline wrote «Je suis le dernier Zadkine» (I am the last Zadkine) in French newspaper Le Figaro, in homage to the artist.

In 1974 he began writing memoirs. He died in 1992 in Paris, aged 91.
