= Boris Vildé =

French linguist and French resistance fighter (1908–1942)

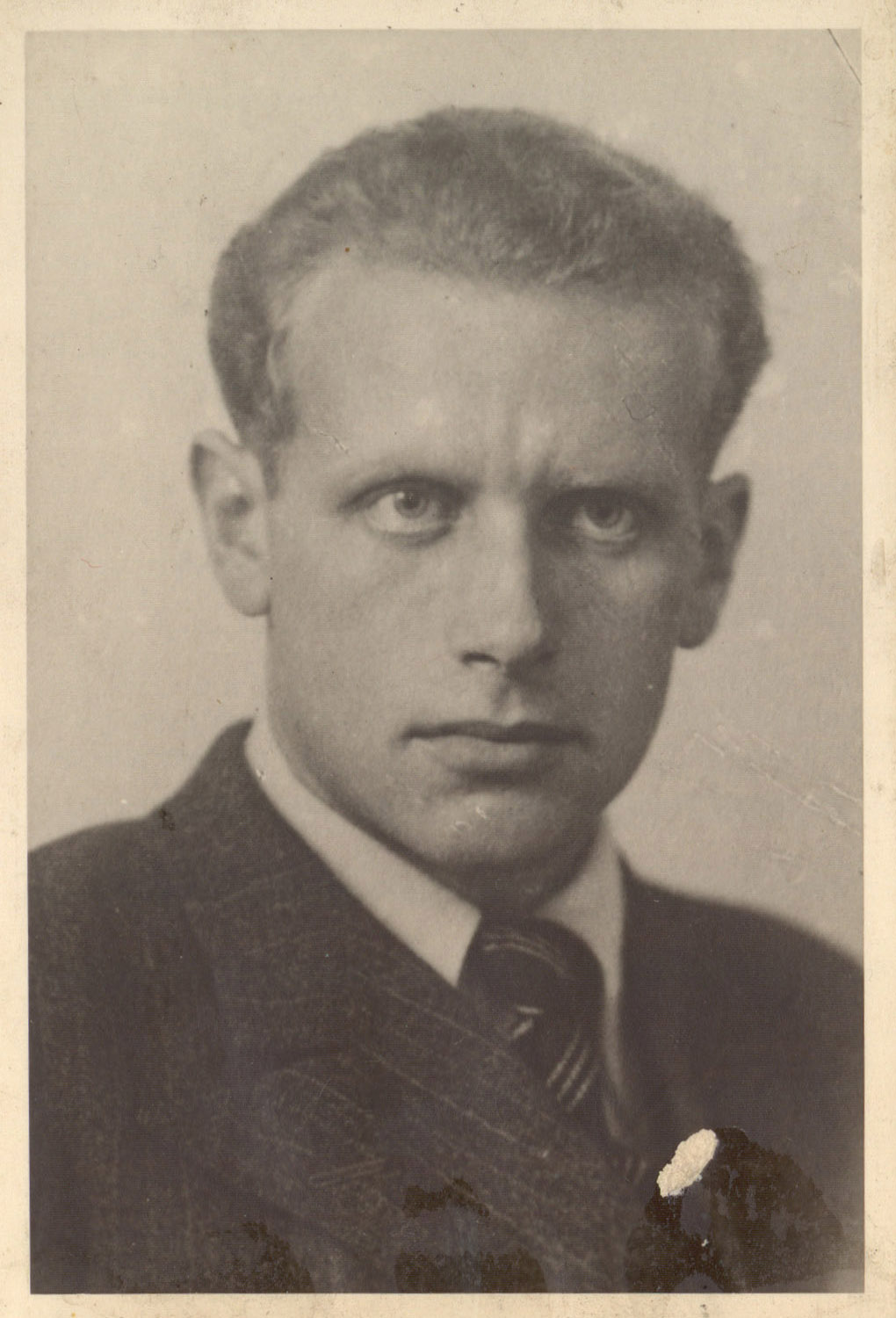
- Boris Vildé
- Born: 25 June 1908; St. Petersburg, Russia
- Died: 23 February 1942 (aged 33); Mont Valérien
- Resting place: Ivry Cemetery, Ivry-sur-Seine
- Occupations: linguist and ethnologist

Boris Vildé (25 June Old Style/8 July 1908 – 23 February 1942) was a linguist and ethnographer at the Musée de l'Homme, in Paris, France. He specialised in polar civilizations.

== Biography ==
He was born in St. Petersburg into a family of Eastern Orthodox Russians. When his father died, his mother moved with him to her family estate in Yastrebino. Because of the Russian Revolution, the family then moved to Tartu, Estonia in 1919. He studied first at the high school and then at the University of Tartu, where he did not complete his courses but learned the German language and some notions of chemistry. He also acquired a taste for literature and poetry and moved to Germany in 1930 hoping for a literary career there. In 1933, as a militant against Nazism, he felt unsafe in Germany and moved to France.

He met Paul Rivet who gave him a job at the Musée de l’Homme and encouraged him to continue his studies at the Sorbonne University, where he obtained a B.A. in German philology in 1937 and two M.A. degrees, in Ethnology in 1938 and Japanese language in 1939. Encouraged by Rivet, he studied the ethnology of the populations of Estonia and Finland during two missions to these countries in 1937 and 1938. When reporting about these missions in French scholarly journals, he took the opportunity to denounce the racism of the Nazis as non-scientific. He was preparing a third mission to Denmark and Norway when World War II started.

Vildé was active in the French Resistance during World War II. In July 1940, Vildé together with Paul Rivet created one of the first resistance groups. During the Resistance he led the scientists and lawyers of the Groupe du musée de l'Homme in producing an anti-Nazi and anti-Vichy newspaper, called Résistance. He had married in 1934 Irène Lot (the daughter of historian Ferdinand Lot and Myrrha Borodina) and had become a French citizen in 1936.

The group, one of the first Résistance units, was infiltrated by a Vichy supporter and, as a result, most of them were arrested, tried and the men among them sentenced to death. Vildé was killed by firing squad, together with Léon-Maurice Nordmann, Georges Ithier, Jules Andrieu, René Sénéchal, Pierre Walter and Anatole Lewitsky, on 23 February 1942 at Fort Mont-Valérien. They are buried in the cemetery at Ivry-sur-Seine.

Boris Vildé last words before being executed by the Nazis were:

“I love France. I love this beautiful country. Yes, I know it can be small-minded, selfish, politically rotten and a victim of its old glory, but with all these faults it remains enormously human and will not sacrifice its stature.”
