= Émile Coornaert =

French historian and journalist (1886–1980)

Émile Coornaert (31 August 1886, Hondschoote, Nord – 25 February 1980) was a French historian, journalist and French Resistance worker.

== Biography ==
Léon-Joseph-Émile Coornaert was born on 31 August 1886, in Hondschoote, Nord, France. He was the thirteenth and last child of a family of farm workers. After the death of his father in 1898, he entered the Petit Séminaire Saint-François d'Assise in Hazebrouck, which he left in 1903. Profoundly influenced by the education he received, he returned to the school very regularly throughout his life. After graduation, he split his time between his studies and his work. He was a member of Le Sillon, a political and religious movement started by Marc Sangier.

After earning his Bachelor of Arts in Journalism in 1906, he pursued studies in history in Lille (at the Institut catholique de Lille) and then at Sorbonne where he obtained a graduate degree in medieval history. Although exempted from military service, he enlisted in 1915. He first fought in the 1st Infantry Regiment, then joined 8th Engineer Regiment until the end of the First World War. He was a Sergeant Engineer who worked in the intelligence section, a role which utilized his knowledge of German.

He married Alice Robert in 1921 and traveled regularly until the end of his life to his family home in Allarmont, Vosges. The couple had three children.

Émile Coornaert died in Paris on 25 February 1980. He is buried at Allarmont. His wife Alice died in 1991 at the age of 94.

== Labour historian ==
Released from the army in 1919, Émile Coornaert passed the History teacher's examination (known in France as "l'agrégation d'histoire") and worked in Alençon, Nancy, and at the Lycée Condorcet in Paris. He received his PhD in 1930, and was named Director of Economic Historical Studies at the École pratique des hautes études where Marc Bloch took a liking to him. He started collaboration with Bloch and the Annales in 1932.

Émile Coornaert was named the Chair of History at the University of São Paulo in Brazil (1934–1935), where he created a French Studies department.

In 1936, Émile Coornaert replaced François Simiand as Chair of Labour History at the Collège de France. He was chosen over Maxime Leroy and Maurice Halbwachs for the position. Halbwachs assessed that "Coornaert is mediocre.... he has done some scholarly work on 15th century corporations... he has a strong Belgian accent, and no other characteristics. A Christian Democrat, and currently a member of the resistance... but a good Catholic, and intent on subsidizing private schools."

Émile Coornaert published two theses on the drapery-sayetterie of Hondschoote (13th to 18th century) and the wool industry in Bergues-Saint-Winnoc (14th to 17th century). In 1941, he wrote a book on French Corporations before 1789.

== Membership in the Resistance ==
In 1941, Émile Coornaert joined the Resistance movement created by Henri de Montfort, Director of Services at the Institut de France.

The group, composed notably of diplomat Paul Petit, writer Marietta Martin, and Suzanne Feingold, published La France continue beginning in 1941. The newspaper was printed by the Parisian press of Francisque Gay, situated on Cardinal Street. The tone of the paper was considered "very literary and occasionally rude. It made blunt, violent attacks against Pétain."

La France continue was, along with L'Université libre and Témoignage chrétien, one of the rare resistance journals which denounced the situation faced by the Jewish people.

The members of the group followed a Christian-based ideology. After a large part of the group was arrested at the start of 1942, several of the remaining members joined the Jacques Destrées' Resistance movement. Émile Coornaert cooperated with different networks doing information work.

Following World War II, La France continue became Ici Paris, on 13 June 1945.

== Union activist ==
Émile Coornaert had worked before the war for the French Confederation of Christian Workers at the Écoles normales ouvrières.

After the war, Émile Coornaert stayed close to his Christian Democratic background. He contributed to the relaunch of the Syndicat général de l'Éducation nationale (the General Union of National Education), affiliating it with the CFTC with Marcel Reinhard, a teacher at Lycée Louis-le-Grand. During a meeting on 26 October 1944 Émile Coornaert was elected president of the union.

He enforced the notion of using the union as an "instrument of social transformation" which would continue the work of the Resistance through "a revolution without hatred and without violence, inspired by a spiritual conception of the world." He represented the union as part of the commission preparing the implementation of the Langevin-Wallon plan to reform education.

After the rejection of a school policy motion which he had presented, Émile Coornaert left his position as president of SGEN but continued his involvement in the life of the union. The position he had held was dismantled.

== Academic life ==
In continuing his activities as a historian, Émile Coornaert published books on France and international commerce in Antwerp, end of the 15th century to the beginning of the 16th century (1961) and French compagnonnages, from the Middle Ages to modern times (1966). His final book, published in 1977, was on the historical profession (Destins de Clio en France depuis 1800).

In 1958, he became a member of the Académie des Inscriptions et Belles-Lettres, one of the five academies in the Institut de France. He was named a member of the Historical Commission on the French Revolution, a commission created as part of the Committee for Historical and Scientific Works (CTHS, 1969-1980).
