= Ici Paris =

Weekly French magazine, founded in 1941, focusing on celebrity and entertainment news

Ici Paris is a French magazine, founded in 1941. During World War II it was a journal of the resistance with editors such as Raymond Burgard, Émile Coornaert, Suzanne Feingold, Marietta Martin, Henri de Montfort and Paul Petit. In 1986 it had a circulation of 700,000 copies and in 2006, a more modest circulation of 405,000 copies.

The magazine is also sold in Algeria and at the beginning of the 1970s it was one of the best-selling weeklies in the country.

In 2003 on the occasion of a strike event of intermittents du spectacle (during Star Academy season 3), Acrimed comments with irony how Ici Paris reported it, and compared the strikers to hostage takers, putting thus casts doubt on the apoliticism displayed by Ici Paris.

In 2019, Hachette sold Ici Paris and other magazines to Czech Media Invest, parent of Czech News Center.

== See also ==
- Media of France
