= Marietta Martin =

French journalist and writer (1902–1944)

Marietta Martin (1902–1944) was a French writer, journalist and French Resistance worker. She was an editor of La France Continue, a clandestine Resistance newspaper, transformed, after her death, into Ici Paris.

== Early years and education ==
Marietta Martin (also called Marietta Arthur-Martin or Marietta Martin-Le Dieu) was born 4 October 1902 at Arras (Pas-de-Calais). She was the daughter of Arthur Martin, editor-in-chief of Le Courrier du Pas-de-Calais, and Henriette Martin-Le Dieu. When she was four, her father died, and she lived with her mother, a piano teacher at Arras, and her sister Lucie. During the German offensive in the north of France in August 1914, the family took refuge in Paris.

After attending high school at the lycée Molière, she enrolled in the Faculty of Medicine then switched to study for a degree in literature. She learned several languages, becoming fluent in English, German, Spanish, Italian, Polish and Danish. She was a musician, playing the piano and the violin. She travelled in several countries, and had long stays in Poland, where she lived with her sister and her brother-in-law, Adam Rosé, a diplomat and minister. Her travels inspired her to write an essay on Marie-Thérèse Geoffrin.

In 1925, under the guidance of thesis supervisor Fernand Baldensperger, she presented her thesis for the degree of doctor of comparative literature. Its subject was the life and work of David Ferdinand Koreff, a German doctor whose connections included some notable French writers.

== Writer ==
Suffering from lung disease, Marietta Martin spent several years between 1927 and 1931 in Switzerland, in a sanatorium in Leysin in the Canton of Vaud.

In 1933, her first literary work was published, Histoires du paradis (Stories of Paradise).

In a letter written from Switzerland, she summarised her thought: "If a message has to be sent around the world, it shouldn't be based on suffering, that would increase suffering; it would be a false message. If it is a message for the earth, it should be a message for body and spirit. To really live, according to all the rules, the definitive teaching is: be joyous."

In 1936, Martin was approached by Maurice Tailliandier (1873-1951), out-going deputy of the second electorate of Pas-de-Calais (Arras), where he belonged to the Republicain et social group. He asked her to prepare documents for his political campaign. She accepted the work, in the name of support given by her father to Henri Tailliandier, Maurice's father, who had been deputy in the same electorate from 1885-1910.

In 1938 Marietta Martin prepared a collection of her poems, Adieu temps (Farewell, time) that was published posthumously in 1947.

== Resistance worker ==
Shortly after the beginning of the war, Marietta Martini became part of the Réseau Hector, an important intelligence and combat group in the Zone Nord, the northern and western part of France under the German military administration in occupied France during World War II.

She joined La France Continue, a resistance movement in France which between 1941 and 1942 published an underground newspaper with the same name. Her bedroom in the rue de l'Assomption in Paris (16 th arrondissement) became the editorial office of the newspaper. Others who worked in this movement included Henri and Annie de Montfort, Paul Petit, Émile Coornaert, Suzanne Feingold and Raymond Burgard.

Twelve issues of the newspaper were published between 1941 and 1942. Marietta Martin wrote articles for the newspaper, and delivered copies by bicycle in Paris. She also sent out several thousand copies by post.

La France Continue was distributed by a group led by Robert Guédon. In February 1942, the group was shut down by Geheime Feldpolizei, the German secret military police. Paul Petit, Raymond Burgard and Marietta Martin were taken in the same raid. The military police searched Marietta Martin's room on the night of 7 to 8 February 1942 and seized a document with the title "Avec de Gaulle, avec l'Angleterre" (With de Gaulle, with England). In a judgement in 1943, it was described as a fairly long political article, written by her and reworked several times. The German authorities would have put it in a safe place, but it has never been found.

Marietta Martin was accused of writing and circulating clandestine publications and of being an activist in the Libération Nationale movement of Henri Frenay and Robert Guédon. She was imprisoned in La Santé Prison in Paris, and then deported to Germany 16 March 1942, where she stayed in eight successive penitentiary establishments. Along with Paul Petit and Raymond Burgard, she was condemned to death on 16 October 1943 by the People's Court (Germany) (Volksgerichtshof) of Saarbrücken for complicity with the enemy.

In prison in Cologne awaiting execution, she was cared for by fellow prisoner and Resistance worker Gilberte Bonneau du Martray. Other Resistance workers in the prison at that time included Elizabeth Dussauze, Jane Sivadon, Hélène Vautrin and Odile Kienlen. Because of bombardments, Marietta Martin was transferred, on a stretcher because of weakness, to Frankfurt. She died there on 11 November 1944. In 1949, her body was repatriated to Paris where she was buried with military honours in the Clichy cemetery.

== Honours and recognition ==
On 18 April 1946 Mariette Martin was posthumously awarded the Legion of Honour and the Croix de guerre. On 26 August 1947, she was cited for the order of the army corps. She was made a sub-lieutenant of Free France (Forces françaises combattantes, France Libre).

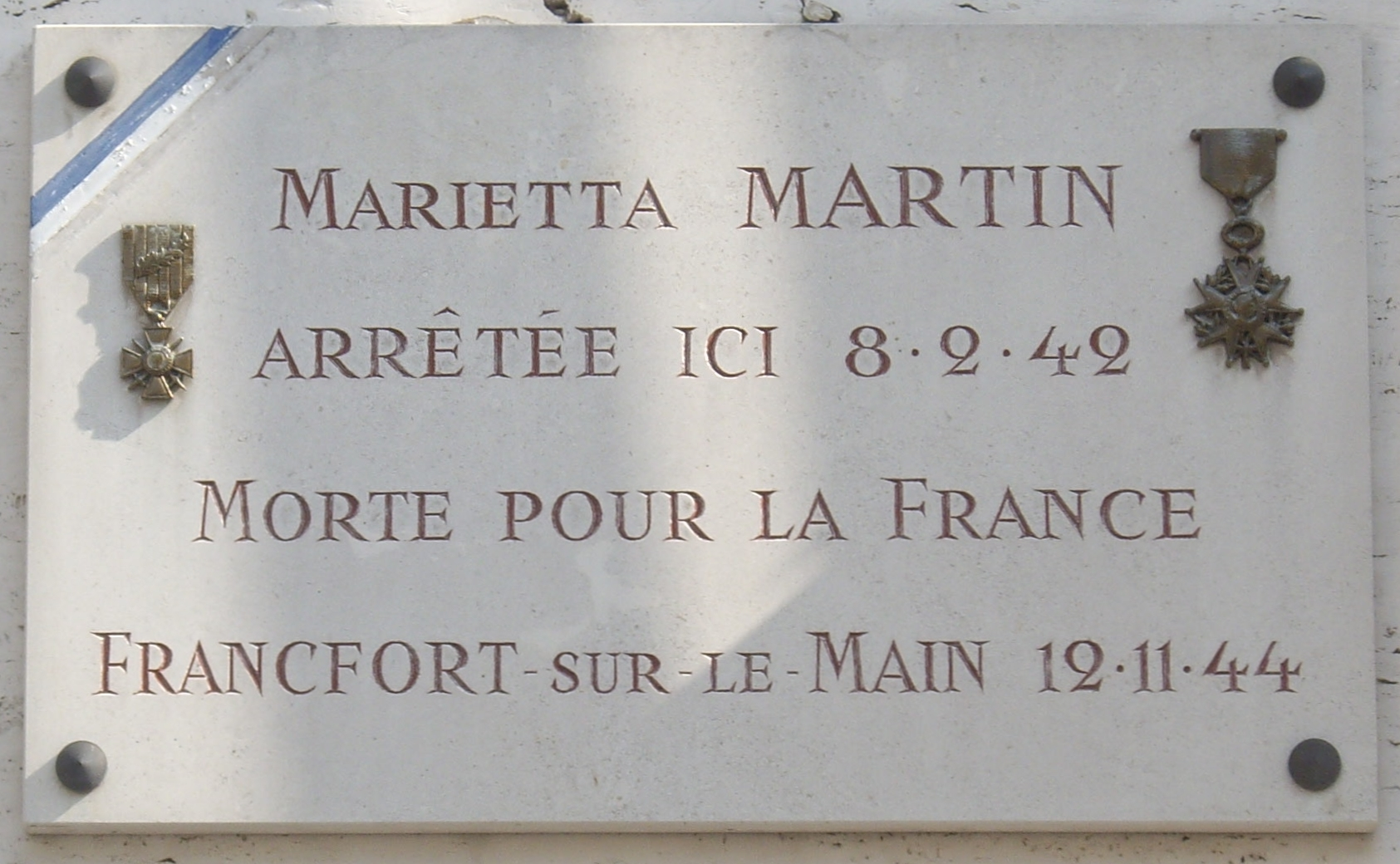
Commemorative plaque

Marietta Martin is included among the 157 writers whose names are cited in the Panthéon in Paris as having died for France during the war 1939-1945.

In the 16th arrondissement in Paris there as a commemorative plaque for her at 34 rue de l'Assomption, and a street in the same arrondissement bears her name.
