= Henri de Montfort =

Henri de Montfort (19 January 1889 – 30 December 1965) was a French historian, writer, journalist and French Resistance worker. He co-founded Ici Paris.

== Baltic historian ==
Henri Marie Archambault de Montfort was born on 19 January 1889 in La Flèche (Sarthe). He defended his political science thesis on Condorcet’s ideas on suffrage in 1915 at the University of Poitiers.

He was the director of Alexandre Ribot’s secretariat during Ribot’s last term as President of the Council of Ministers and Minister of Foreign Affairs (March - September 1917).

In 1919 he married Annie Deguirmendjian-Shah-Vekil, with whom he published several books. They had four children.

From 1923 to 1932 Henri de Montfort was the special correspondent for French newspaper Le Temps in Poland and in Baltic states. He published several works about the political situation and the history of Poland, Finland, and the Baltic States. He was awarded the Latvian Order of the Three Stars 3rd Class on 15 November 1935.

== Literary career ==
In addition to his articles and scientific publications, Henri de Montfort co-authored four books with novelist Paul de Garros: L’Inexplicable Crime (The Inexplicable Crime) in 1921, Le Fils de Don Quichotte (The Son of Don Quixote) in 1924; Douloureuses fiançailles (Stressful Engagement) in 1925, and Reine des errants (The Queen of Wanderers) in 1933.

These sentimental novels were published in inexpensive collections like the Livre de Poche series produced by Jules Tallandier. For the most part, they were published after Garros's disappearance.

== Organizer of a resistance network ==
He became director of services of the Institute of France. Under German-occupied France, he and his wife Annie created and operated a clandestine newspaper of French Resistance called La France continue.

Thirteen issues of La France continue were published between 10 June 1941 and February 1942. Its contributors include: Raymond Burgard, Emile Coornaert, Suzanne Feingold, Marietta Martin, and Paul Petit, who had inspired the newspaper. The tone of the paper was very literary and sometimes harsh. It was particularly critical of Philippe Pétain.

The network broke up in February 1942 after several of its members, including Raymond Burgard, Marietta Martin, and Paul Petit were arrested.

Henri de Montfort continued his resistance activities in secret. Annie de Montfort was arrested for acts of Resistance in 1943 and died in a concentration camp.

== Publisher ==
On 13 June 1945 Henri de Montfort and Suzanne Feingold, with help from Professor René Cassin, began publishing Ici Paris as a replacement for La France continue. The name of the new publication was a reference to the opening message of Radio Londres (Radio London), a French resistance station based in England: "Ici Londres, les français parlent aux français" ("This is London, the French are speaking to the French").

For their motto, Henri de Montfort chose a quotation by Georges Clemenceau: "Dans la guerre comme dans la paix, le dernier mot est à ceux qui ne se rendent jamais." ("In war as in peace, the last word belongs to those who never surrender."). From 1946 on, Ici Paris was no longer a political newspaper.

Henri de Montfort married Suzanne Feingold, the former secretary of the Alliance israélite universelle (1924 - 1945). In the 1950s, he was the general secretary of l’Académie internationale de science politique et d’histoire constitutionnelle (International Academy of Political Science and Constitutional History), which was based at the University of Sorbonne. He continued to pursue his work as a historian, with a focus on Poland.

His last book, published in 1966, examined the Katyn Massacre, in which Polish officers were executed by the NKVD during World War II.

As an officer of the Legion of Honor and an Officer of the Order of Polonia Restituta (Order of Rebirth of Poland), Henri de Montfort died on 30 December 1965.
