= Suzanne Feingold =

French Resistance worker (1904–1977)

Suzanne Feingold (1904–1977) was a French Resistance worker. She was an editor of Ici Paris.

== Early life ==
Suzanne Feingold was born on February 1, 1904, in the 9th district of Paris. She was the daughter of Sehie Ber, known as Otto Feingold, and Louise Zimmermann. Her parents became French citizens in 1908: her father by naturalization (he was born in the Austrian Empire in 1866) and her mother by reinstatement (she was born in Barr, Alsace in 1865).

Suzanne married Roger Lévi in 1922, and had a daughter.

== Work for the AIU ==
After obtaining her baccalaureate, Suzanne Feingold served as Secretary of the Israelite Universal Alliance (in French, the Alliance Israelite Universelle or AIU) from 1924 to the end of 1945.

== In the Resistance ==
Feingold was part of the creation of France Continues (La France Continue). Notable members of this resistance movement included Henri de Montfort, Paul Petit, Emile Coornaert, Marietta Martin, and Annie de Montfort.

France Continues published a clandestine newspaper. Thirteen issues appeared between June 1941 and February 1942.
