= Pál Simon =

Pál Simon may refer to:

- Pál Simon (athlete)
- Pál Simon (politician)

== See also ==
- Paul Simon (disambiguation)
