= Five Martyrs of the Lycée Buffon =

The Five Martyrs of the Lycée Buffon were five students from the Lycée Buffon shot by the Germans in Paris at the Stand de tir de Balard on 8 February 1943 for their activities with the French Resistance. Also, their families were taken hostage. Following the war, each of the students was posthumously awarded the Legion of Honour, the Croix de guerre 1939–1945 and the Resistance medal.

== Composition of the group ==
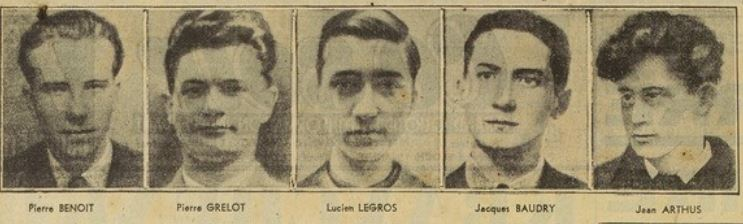
Five Martyrs of the Lycée Buffon (Ce soir, 9 February 1943)

Name	Pseudonym	Born	Age
Jean-Marie Arthus	"Marchand"	2 April 1925	18
Jacques Baudry	"André"	7 April 1922	21
Pierre Benoit	"Francis"	7 March 1925	18
Pierre Grelot	"Paul"	16 May 1923	20
Lucien Legros	"Jeannot"	11 June 1924	19

== Commemorations ==
- There is a Place des cinq martyrs du lycée Buffon in the 14th arrondissement of Paris
- a rue Jacques-Baudry in 15th arrondissement of Paris
- a plaque at lycée Buffon,
- in 1959, La Poste commemorated them with a stamp in the Heroes of the Resistance series
- a rue Lucien Legros in Mont-de-Marsan

== See also ==
- Francs-tireurs et partisans
- Special Sections
- Costa Gavras's film Section spéciale

== Notes and sources ==
=== Sources ===
- Rayski, Adam (October 2006). "Au Stand de Tir: Le massacre des résistants Paris 1942–1944" [At The Shooting Range: The massacre of resistance members Paris 1942–1944] (in French). Mairie de Paris: Direction Générale de l'Information et de la Communication. Archived from the original on 16 September 2011.
- "Les cinq étudiants du Lycée Buffon" [The Five Students from the Lycée Buffon]. Les chemins de la mémoire. Paris: République Française: Ministère de la défense.
