= Edmond Debeaumarché =

French postal worker who joined the French Resistance

Edmond Debeaumarché (15 December 1906 – 28 March 1959) was a French postal worker who joined the French Resistance during World War II. For his service Debeaumarché was highly decorated. In 1960 Debeaumarché received the posthumous distinction of being depicted on a postage stamp in the series Heroes of the Resistance.

== Biography ==
Debeaumarché was born on 15 December 1906 in Dijon, and first wanted to become a pilot, but his eyesight was too weak and he joined the French postal service, PTT. He was mobilized in September 1939 as a sergeant in the French Air Force and after June 1940 joined the French Resistance.

Debeaumarché was in charge of the transportation of mail, a position he used to smuggle mail for the resistance. From the summer of 1943 on, he was on the staff of the Action-PTT, a clandestine organisation within the French postal service, and worked with Ernest Pruvost, its national leader, and directly under Simone Michel-Lévy, establishing postal communications with London. When Michel-Levy was arrested in November 1943, Debeaumarché took over as head of the Action-PTT. Traveling throughout France he created networks of resistance, and organized the sabotage of the enemy's telecommunications (the plans Potard and Violet—the latter involved cutting telephone cables before D-Day). In addition, he managed to procure the codebooks of the three secret codes used by Joseph Darnand and the Milice and used them to decipher copies of telegrams obtained from the central telegraph office in Paris. The deciphered texts were then passed on to Allied intelligence.

He was arrested on 3 August 1944 at the Gare Montparnasse, and questioned harshly by the Gestapo at the Rue des Saussaies. He lost consciousness under the beatings but did not divulge any names; he was subsequently held at Fresnes Prison. Debeaumarché was one of the so-called "77,000" (named for the prisoners' numbers, between 76,000 and 78,000), Fresnes prisoners who were transported by train from Pantin to Buchenwald on 15 August 1944. He was moved to the underground factory of Mittelbau-Dora which produced V-1 flying bombs and V-2 rockets, and posing as an electrical engineer was put to work in the manufacture of the V-1. Maurice Naegelé, a Kapo in the tunnel assembly section, gained the trust of Debeaumarché by relating details of the resistance movement in France. In fact Naegelé had been an agent of the Gestapo, before his deportation. Naegelé denounced Debeaumarché to SS-Oberscharführer Sander, head of surveillance at Mittelbau-Dora. Debeaumarché was arrested with others (including Naegelé) on the night of 3–4 November 1944. They were taken to the Niedersachswerfen SD headquarters, where Naegelé attempted to beat confessions out of the other prisoners. Debeaumarché was sentenced to death on 11 November 1944, but the sentence was not carried out. Instead Debeaumarché was held in solitary confinement, accused of anti-Nazi plotting. In April 1945 he was moved to Bergen-Belsen, where he was liberated during the advance of Allied troops on 15 April 1945 and repatriated to France. On 1 May 1945 he marched down the Champs-Élysées alongside fellow Buchenwald-captive Pierre Dejussieu-Pontcarral.

After the war, he was a member of the Provisional Consultative Assembly and had a number of high administrative functions with the PTT. He served as president of the Union Nationale des Associations de Déportés, Internés et Familles de disparus. He died on 28 March 1959 in Suresnes, and was honored with a service in Les Invalides; his remains were buried in Dijon.

== Honours and awards ==
=== French ===
- Grand Officer of the Légion d'honneur – 1957
- Order of Liberation
- War Cross 1939–1945 with Palm and Silver Star

=== Foreign ===
- Medal of Freedom (United States)
- Officer of the Order of the Crown with distinction (Belgium)
- War Cross 1940-1945 with distinction (Belgium)
