= Annie de Montfort =

French writer and physician (1897–1944)

Annie de Montfort (16 December 1897 – 10 November 1944) was a French writer and physician and a member of the French Resistance during the Second World War.

== Early life ==
She was born Arthémise Deguirmendjian-Shah-Vekil in the 9th arrondissement of Paris. Her parents were born in Turkey and were Armenia Armenian in origin. She studied medicine before the First World War.

On 3 February 1919, Annie married Henri de Montfort, a historian and academic who worked at the Institut de France, and they had four children: Claude, Marc, Anne-Marie and François. Marc de Montfort (1923–1998) was a lawyer who would become noted for his humanitarian work with Polish dissidents. Also in 1919, Annie de Montfort was a co-founder of the Association France-Pologne, which had a diplomatic and cultural role and published a journal called La Pologne from 1920.

== Wartime activities ==
In 1939, Hachette published Pologne, a work jointly produced by Henri and Annie de Montfort. In 1941, the couple launched an underground Resistance publication called La France continue.

On 18 March 1943, Annie was arrested at Grenoble, and interned at Fresnes Prison. Along with nearly a thousand other women, she was deported to a concentration camp, with transport 175, leaving Paris on 31 January 1944. Her husband continued his Resistance activities despite the breakup of his network as a result of the arrests of key members such as Paul Petit and Marietta Martin; Petit, Martin and others were executed in Germany during 1944.

Along with other inmates of the camp, Annie de Montfort began creating an international cultural association for the prisoners. On 6 November she was admitted to the camp's sick bay, where she died a few days later. Her death was witnessed by a fellow Resistance worker, Germaine Tillion.

== Death and legacy ==
A plaque in honour of Annie de Montfort was erected at the Collegiate Church of Saint-Martin de Montmorency. The inscription reads, "À la mémoire de Annie Archambault de Montfort, déléguée générale de l'association France-Pologne, morte pour la France et la Pologne le 10 novembre 1944" (In memory of Annie Archambault de Montfort, general delegate of the France-Poland Association, who died for France and Poland on 10 November 1944.The central bronze medallion was designed by sculptor Henri Dropsy.

Her name is listed with those of other French writers at the Panthéon in Paris. She was posthumously awarded the Légion d'honneur. Her son, François de Montfort, recorded her achievements in his 1961 book Adolf Eichmann, levez-vous!
