= Lycée Buffon =

School in Paris, France

Coordinates: 48°50′35″N 2°18′41″E

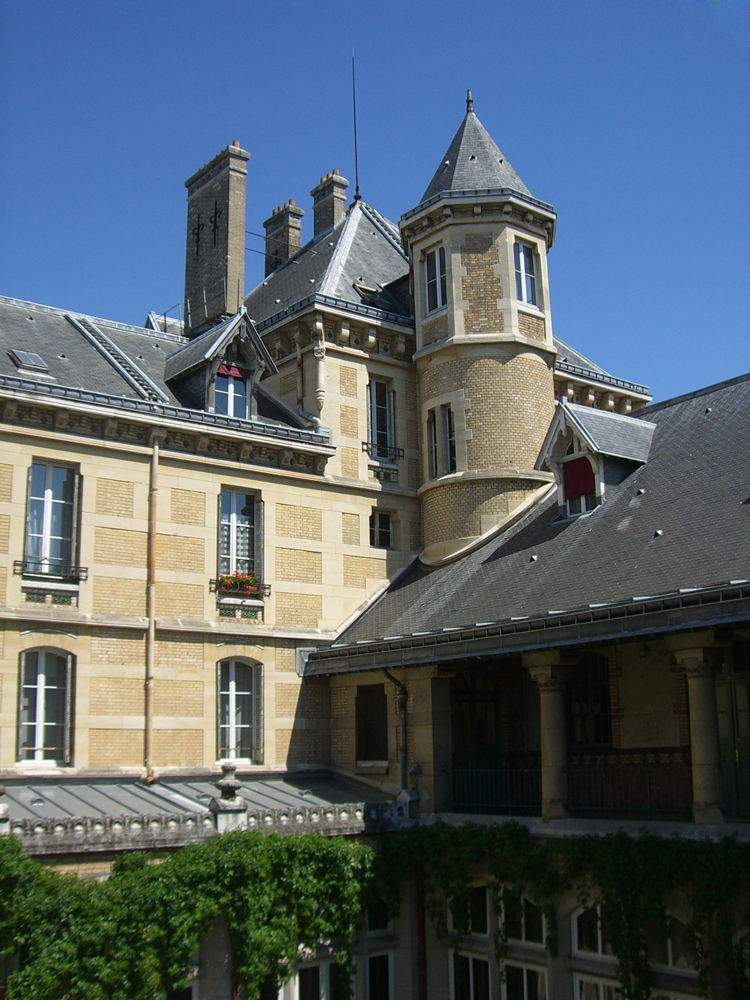
One of the school's eight towers.

The Lycée Buffon is a secondary school in the XVe arrondissement of Paris, bordered by boulevard Pasteur, the rue de Vaugirard and the rue de Staël. Its nearest métro station is Pasteur. It is named for Georges-Louis Leclerc, comte de Buffon. Jean-Claude Durand is its current proviseur.

It is a "cité scolaire" made up of a collège, a lycée and scientific classes préparatoires. It has 2 000 students, served by 170 professors, 4 "conseillers principaux d'éducation" and 50 other teaching personnel. It also houses an adult education centre for those taking the BTS and the Licence des métiers de l'immobilier, and a UPI, the only one in Paris for the visually impaired. The young visually impaired students can then integrate into classical education.

The religious scholar Odon Vallet studied here, and its teachers have included the philosopher and journalist Maurice Clavel, the theatre critic and historian Gilles Sandié, and the writer and cineaste Jean Pelgri. The school's sundial can be seen on an exterior wall on rue de Vaugirard.

== History ==
- 1885 : The architect Joseph Auguste Émile Vaudremer conceived the idea and design for a "lycée de la rive gauche", to be built on the site of the old cimetière de Vaugirard.
- 1888 : The establishment took the name "lycée Buffon", after the naturalist the Comte de Buffon, on the centenary of his death.
- 1889 : First entrants, under director M. Adam.
- 1901 : Opening of the first classe préparatoire.
- 1914-1918 : Served as a military hospital.
- 1940-1945 : A French Resistance centre.
- 8 February 1943: Five of its students - Jean Arthus, Jacques Baudry, Pierre Benoît, Pierre Grelot and Lucien Legros - were shot by a German firing squad at the stand de tir de Balard in Paris. They had been arrested and condemned to death for Resistance activities in 1942. A commemorative plaque to the event is to be seen in the lycée's entrance hall on and it is also commemorated by the naming of the place des Cinq-Martyrs-du-Lycée-Buffon, at the end of boulevard Pasteur.
- 15 June 1944 : Raymond Burgard, a professor at the school, beheaded at Cologne by the Nazis
- 1970 : Introduction of co-ed, achieved in September 1978.
- 1988 : Sports classes set up.
- 1995 : Restoration works begun.
- 1997 : New building for specialist teaching opened.
- 1998 : New school canteen and gymnasium opened.

== Gallery ==
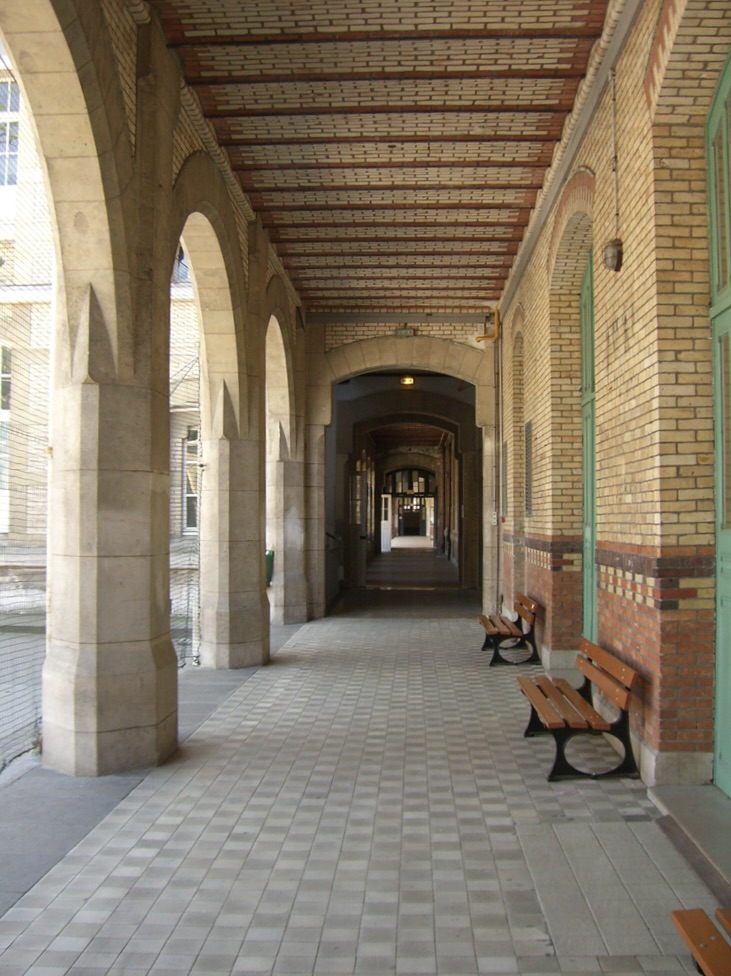
Arcades

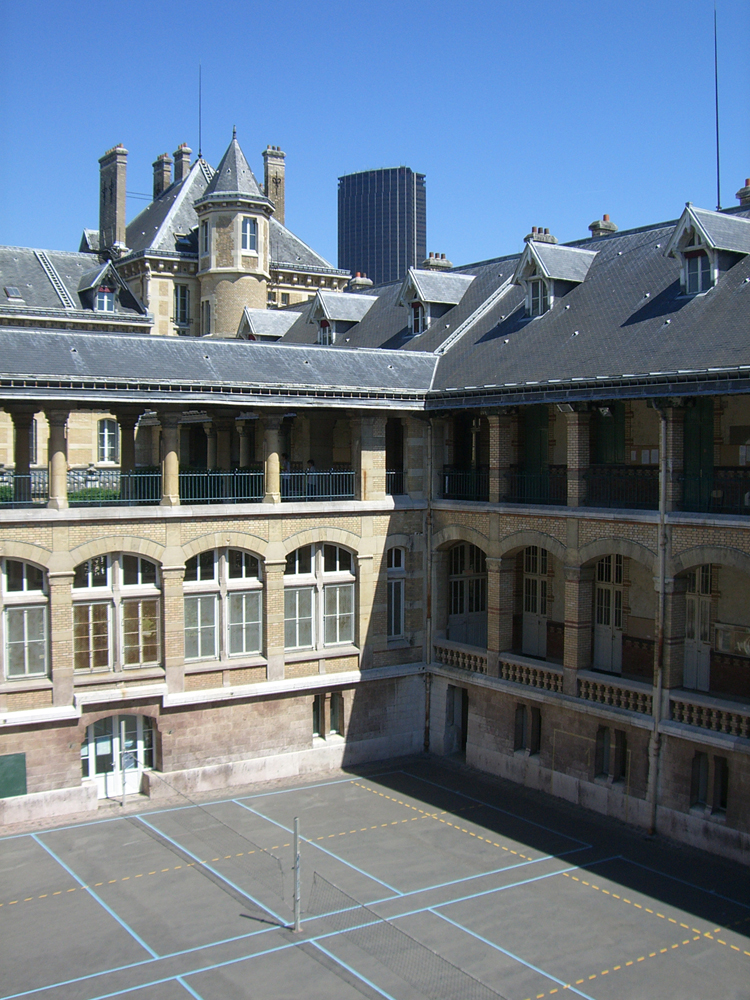
Cour de sport

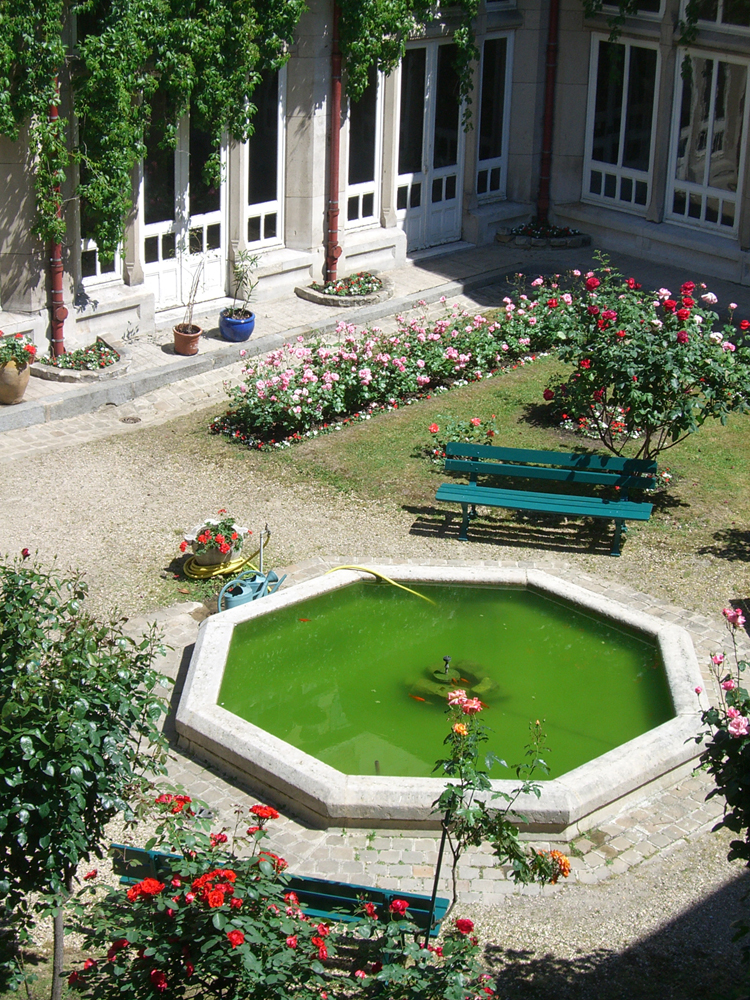
Cour d'honneur

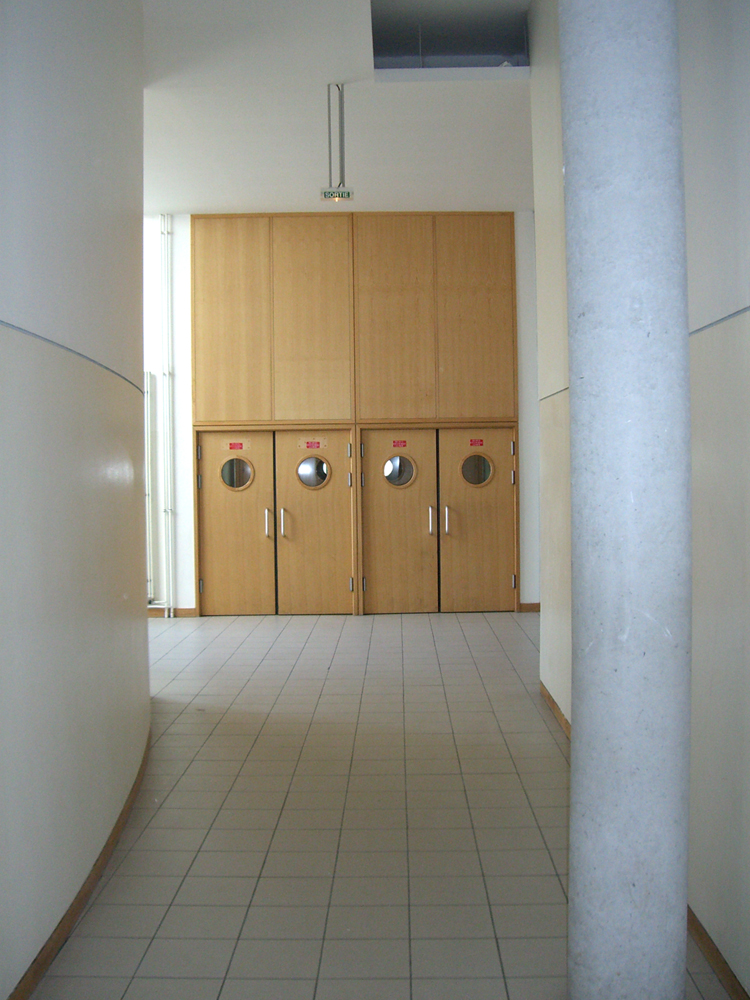
Modern section

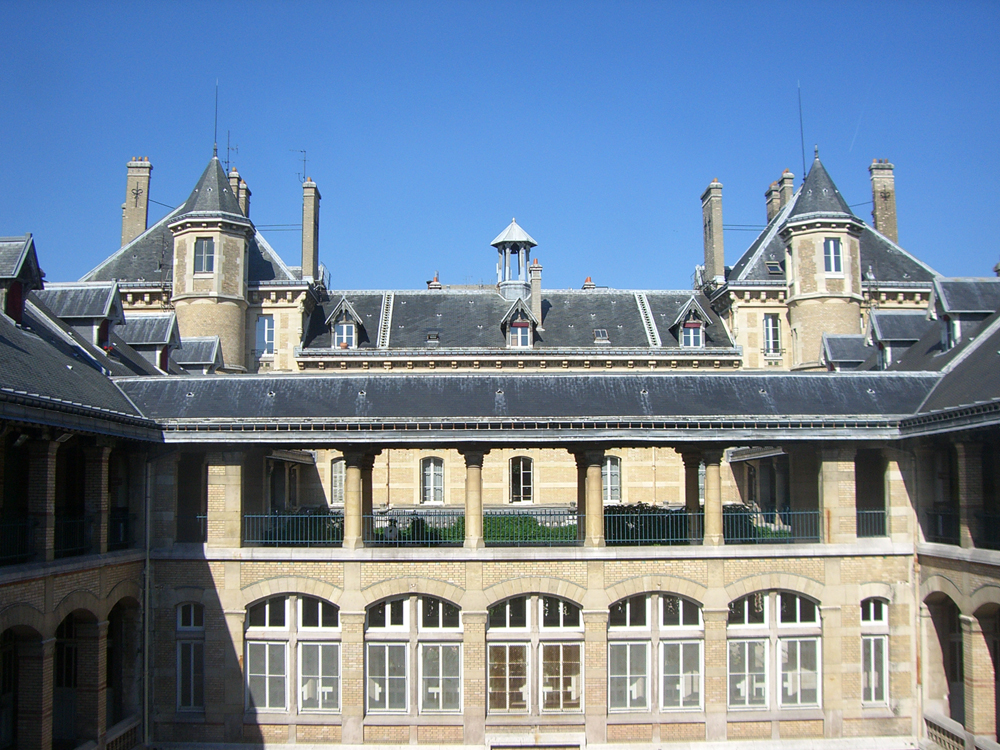
Central courtyard

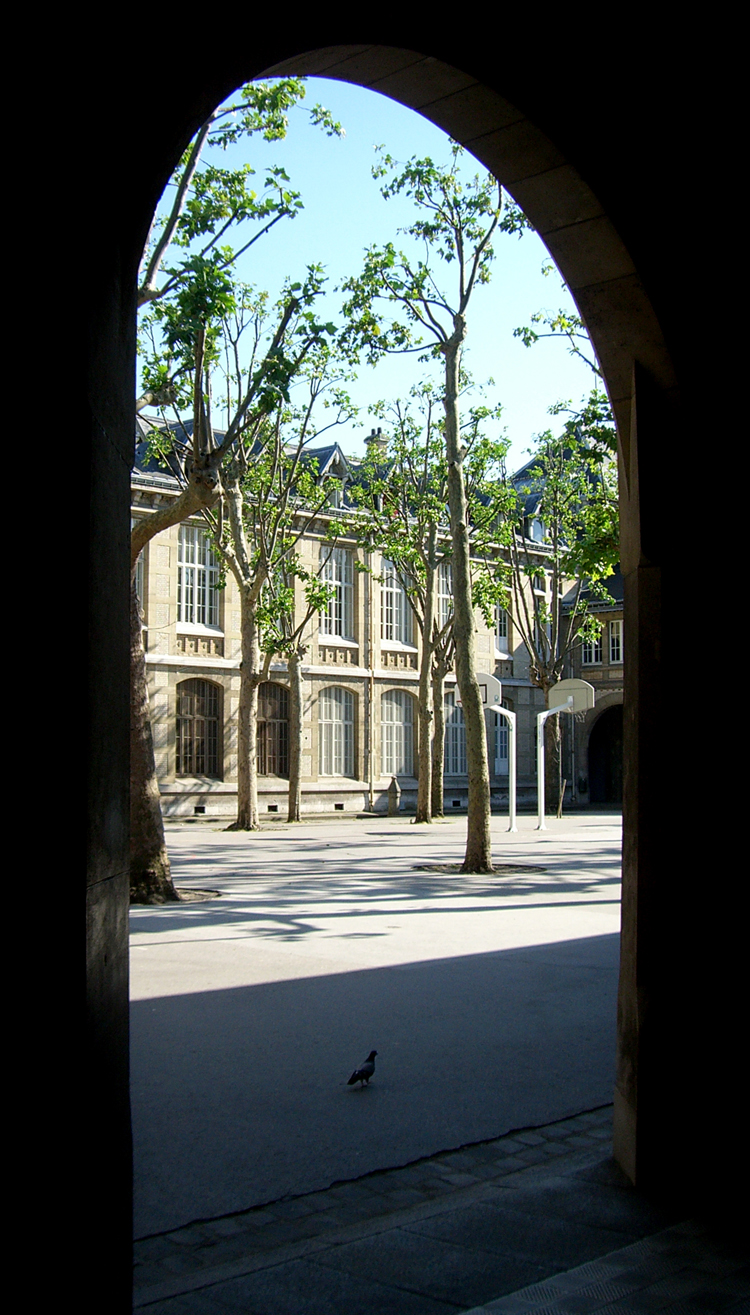
Arcade

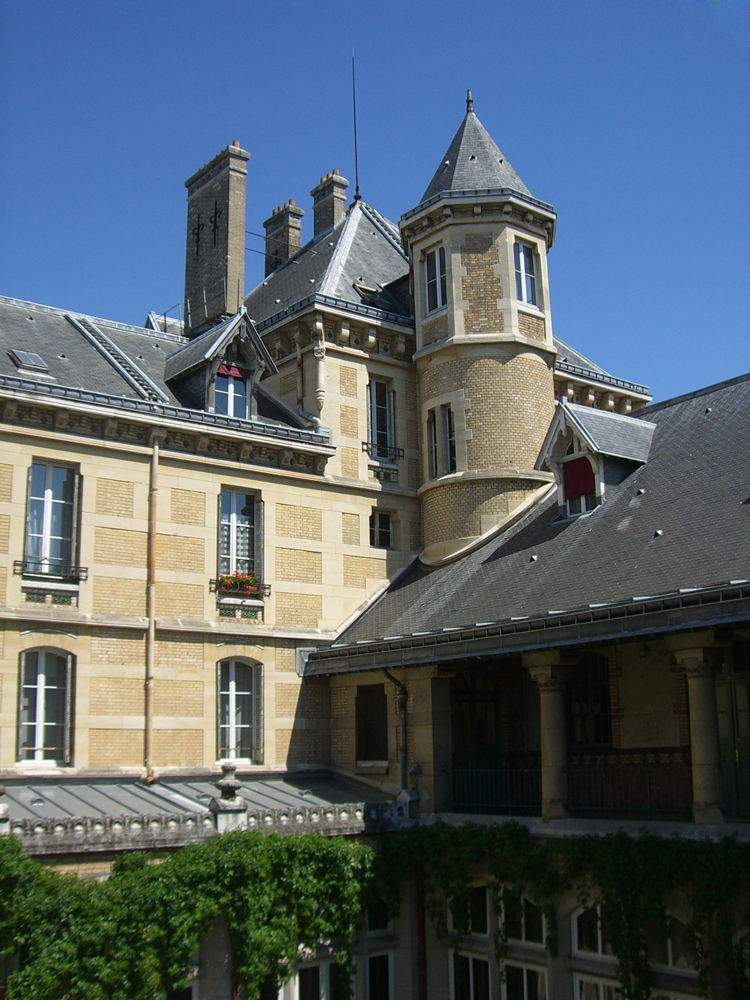
One of the eight towers

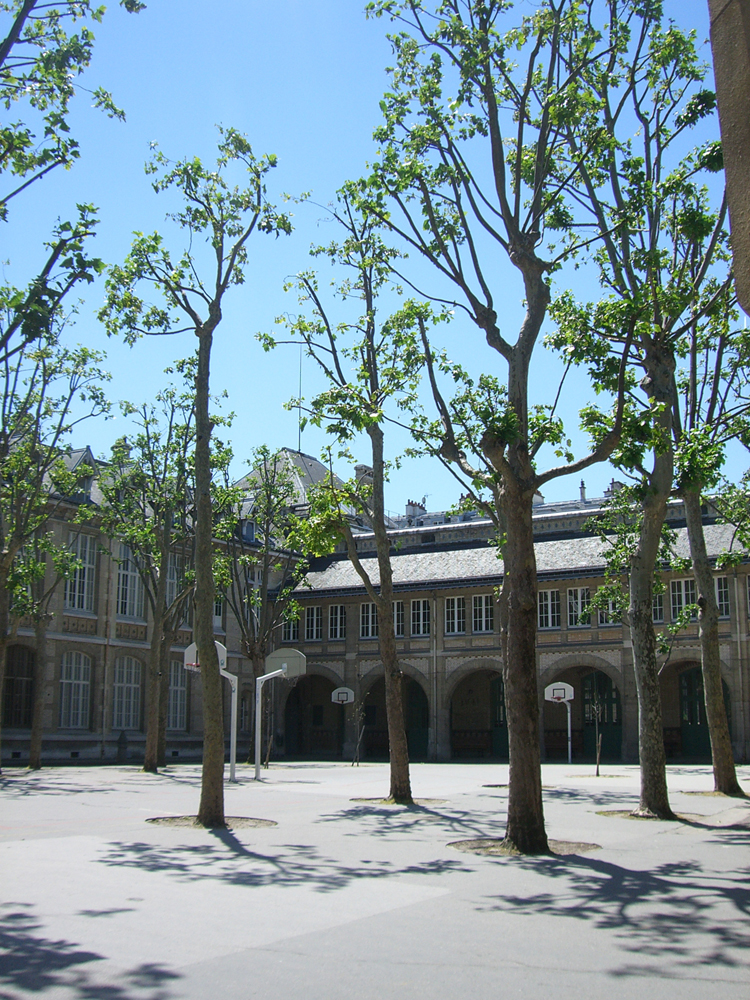
Courtyard
