= Balard shooting range =

Nazi execution site in France

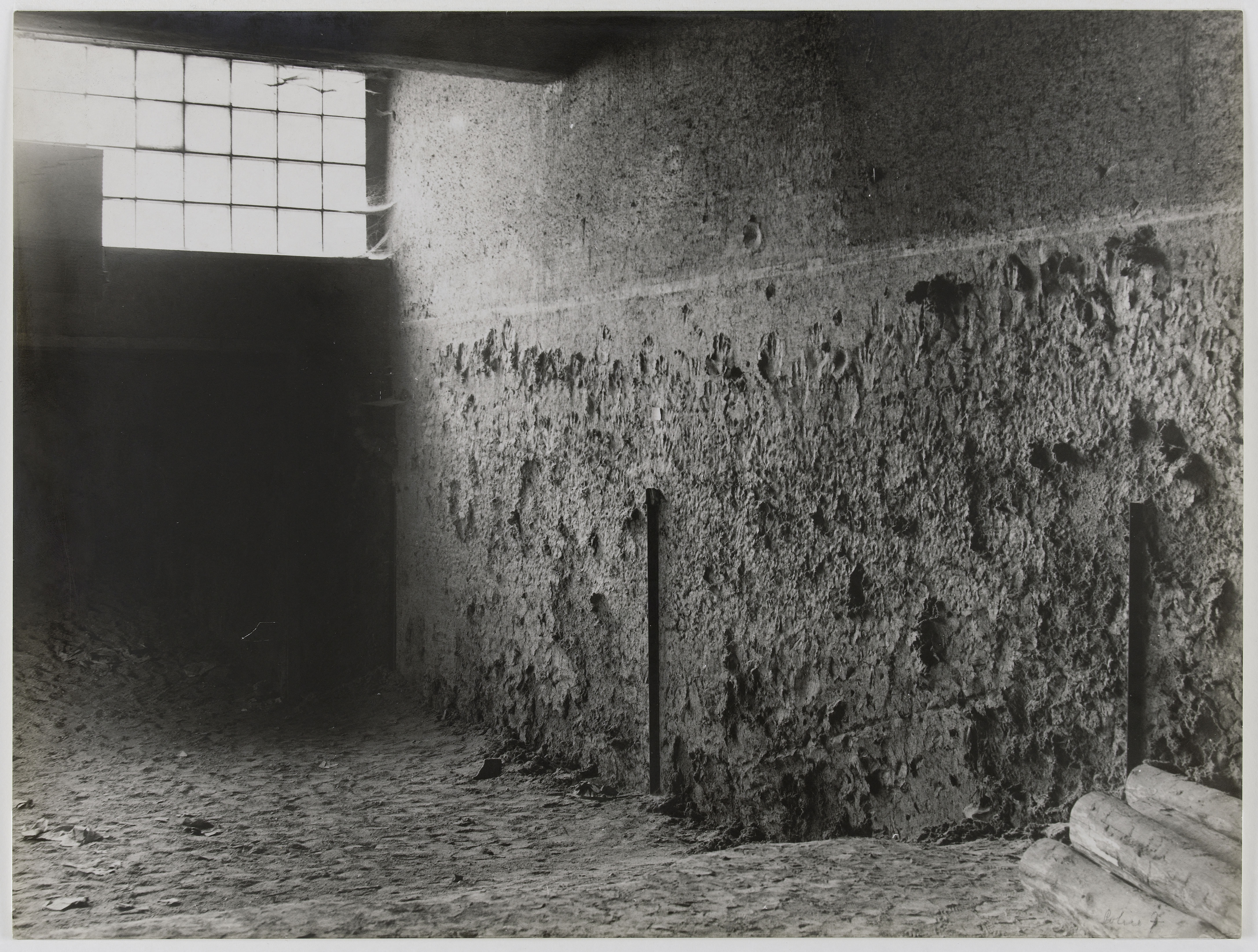

During the Second World War, the Balard shooting range (stand de tir de Balard) was a site of Nazi torture and executions. It disappeared with the construction of the Boulevard périphérique de Paris.

== Location ==
It was situated on the training area at Issy-les-Moulineaux (now within Paris in the 15e arrondissement). The Air Ministry now occupies the site and forms part of the parc Suzanne Lenglen on the old héliport de Paris, which opened in 1957. It was bounded by the quai d’Issy, the boulevard Victor, the rue de la porte d’Issy in Paris 15ème, and by the rue Jeanne d’Arc, the rue Guynemer, the boulevard Gambetta and the boulevard Gallieni in Issy-les-Moulineaux. It was here that the first French attempts at powered flight occurred in 1905, which in 1911 accidentally killed Maurice Berteaux, minister for war.

== History ==
200m and 50m firing ranges were created here in 1938 for police training, and taken over by the German Geheime Feld Polizei (GFP) after the defeat of France in the 1940 Battle of France.

== Victims ==
The first massacre occurred on 6 July 1942, with the Kommando für Kapital Verbrechen charged with "managing" the firing range, on the orders of Karl Oberg, chief of SS and police. 143 people were tortured then shot here, including:

- The five lycéens of the lycée Buffon,
- Robert Beck's network
- French members of the Francs-Tireurs et Partisans
- Members of the colonial FTP-MOI
- Some Gaullists
- Unidentified résistants arrested under the Nacht und Nebel decree

A plaque commemorating the names of the 143 people executed here was unveiled on 23 April 1961 on the wall of the air ministry (BA 117) on the range's exact site.

== Filmography ==
- The stand de tir de Balard appears in some scenes of Jean-Pierre Melville's film Army of Shadows, played by the firing range at the Satory military camp.
