= Heroes of the Resistance =

Heroes of the Resistance is a set of twenty-three stamps issued from 1957 to 1961 by La Poste, commemorating 27 members of the French Resistance who died during the Occupation of France between 1940 and 1945 (apart from Edmond Debeaumarché, who died in 1959). Of the 27, two were Catholic monks and nuns and three were women.

== Commemorated heroes ==
Issued 18 May 1957

- Jean Moulin (1899-1943)
- D'Estienne d'Orves (1901–1941)
- Robert Keller (1899–1945)
- Pierre Brossolette (1903–1944)
- Jean-Baptiste Lebas (1878–1944)

Issued 19 April 1958

- Jean Cavailles (1903–1944)
- Fred Scamaroni (1914–1943)
- Simone Michel-Levy (1906–1945)
- Jacques Bingen (1908–1944)

Issued 25 April 1959

- Five Martyrs of the lycée Buffon

Jean-Marie Arthus (1925–1943)
Jacques Baudry (1922–1943)
Pierre Benoit (1925–1943)
Pierre Grelot (1923–1943)
Lucien Legros (1924–1943)

- Yvonne Le Roux (1882–1945)
- Mederic Vedy (1902–1944)
- Louis Martin-Bret (1898–1944)
- Gaston Moutardier (1889–1944)

Issued 26 March 1960

- Edmond Debeaumarché (1906–1959)
- Pierre Masse (1879–1942)
- Maurice Ripoche (1895–1944)
- Léonce Vieljeux (1865–1944)
- Rene Bonpain (1908–1943)

Issued 22 April 1961

- Jacques Renouvin (1905–1944)
- Lionel Dubray (1923–1944)
- Paul Gateaud (1889–1944)
- Mother Elizabeth (1890–1945)
