= François Simiand =

French sociologist and economist (1873-1935)

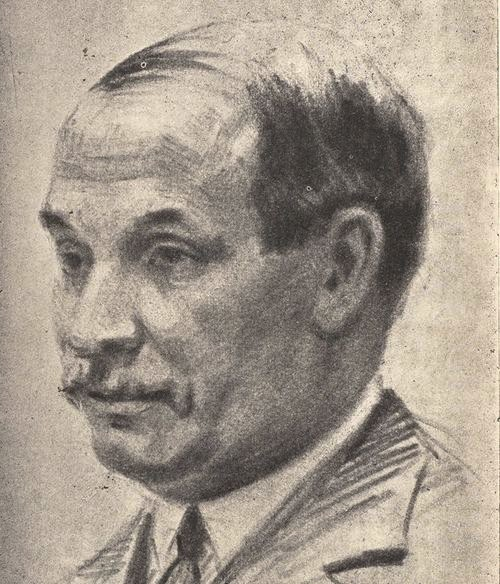
- François Simiand (1934, portrait)
- Born: 18 April 1873
- Died: 13 April 1935 (aged 61); Saint-Raphaël

Academic background
- Influences: Henri Bergson, Émile Durkheim

Academic work
- Discipline: Social economics
- School or tradition: French historical school

François Joseph Charles Simiand (18 April 1873 – 13 April 1935) was a French sociologist and economist best known as a participant in the Année Sociologique. As a member of the French historical school of economics, Simiand predicated a rigorous factual and statistical basis for theoretical models and policies. His contribution to French social science was recognized in 1931 when, at the age of 58, he was elected to the faculty of the Collège de France and accepted the chair in labor history.

Simiand's career was unusual. Like many destined to become influential academics in France, he entered the École Normale Supérieure and graduated in philosophy at the top of his class in 1896. However, he quickly became interested in law and economics and submitted a thesis on the wages of coal miners in France (1904) to the faculty of law rather than becoming an academic. As a result, he foreclosed forever the possibility of a prominent university appointment. Thus in 1901 he became the librarian for the French Ministries of Commerce and Labor, a post he held until the outbreak of World War I. From 1910 on he also taught Economic History at the École Pratique des Hautes Etudes, an institution which did not require a doctorate from its lecturers.

Toward the end of the nineteenth century Simiand joined the editorial board of the Année Sociologique. He became a central member of the group as editor of the economic sociology section and served as its expert on statistics. At the same time, as someone removed from the politics of French academics, he was at an institutional remove from Émile Durkheim's ambitions for transforming the French university.

Simiand moved further into the administrative apparatus of the French state during World War I when he left his position as a librarian for work in the Ministry of Armaments where he played a prominent role in making policy. After the war, he served for a year as the Director of Labor for the province of Alsace-Lorraine. In addition, he took up a more permanent position as a teacher at the Conservatoire National des Arts et Métiers.

A student of Henri Bergson and Émile Durkheim, Simiand advanced a view of economics as a social science grounded in observable phenomena rather than convenient assumptions. This would imply a large program of historical and statistical research. Joseph Schumpeter, who denied the existence of a French or an Italian Historical School despite the historical current evident in their economics, acknowledged the significance of Simiand's contributions. In Schumpeter's view, Simiand should be considered a French Institutionalist.

Simiand's views on scope and method, which appear in La Méthode positive en science économique (1911), were applied in his studies of real wages, money and long economic cycles. They were applied in criticism of the work of contemporary economists, as well.

== Works ==
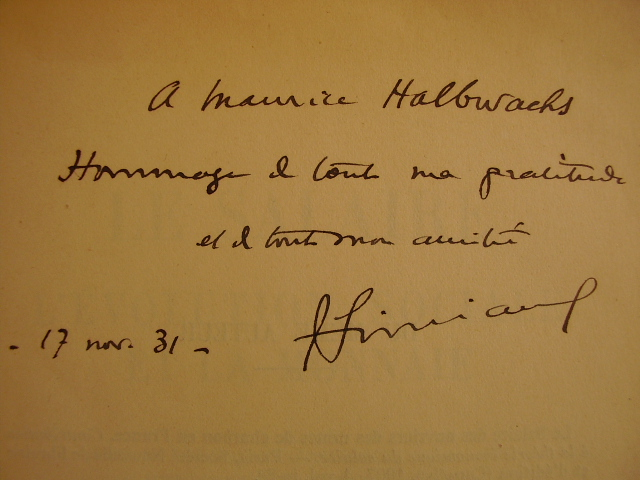
Book signed and offered by F. Simiand to Maurice Halbwachs (Le Salaire. L'évolution sociale et la monnaie (1932)). Book held at the Human and Social Sciences Library Paris Descartes-CNRS.

- Université du Québec à Chicoutimi, Les classiques des sciences sociales: François Simiand.
- "Méthode historique et Science social" Revue de synthèse historique (1903); re-edited Annales ESC 15, no. 1. París (1960)
- Review of Vialles, La consommation et la crise Èconomique, in Année sociologique 7 p. 582 (1902/1903)
- Review of May, Das Grundgesetz der Wirtschaftskrisen, in Année sociologique 7 p. 585 (1902/1903)
- Le salaire des ouvriers des mines de charbon en France Societe Nouvelle de Librarie et D'edition, 1904
- "La causalité en histoire" Bulletin de la Société française de philosophie 6, pp. 245–272, 276–290 (1906)
- M. F. Simiand, Review of Jevons, Pareto and Marshall L'année sociologique pp. 516–45 (1909) New School Net (on line)
- La Méthode positive en science économique (1911); in Critique sociologique de l'économie. Paris, PUF. VI ISBN 2-13-054756-7
- Le Salaire: l'evolution sociale et la monnaie 3 vols., Librairie Felix Alcan, París (1932)
- Recherches anciennes et nouvelles sur le mouvement général des prix du VXIe au XIXe siècle Paris, Domat-Montclirctien (1932)
- Les Fluctuations économiques à longue période de la crise mondiale (1933)
- "La monnaie, réalité sociale", Les Annales Sociologiques, série D, fascicule 1 p. 45 (1934); in Critique sociologique de l'économie. Paris, PUF. VI ISBN 2-13-054756-7
- La psychologie sociale des crises et les fluctuations économiques de courte durée, Paris, Félix Alcan (1937). Originally published in Annales Sociologiques.

== See also ==
- History of economic thought
