= Éric Laborey =

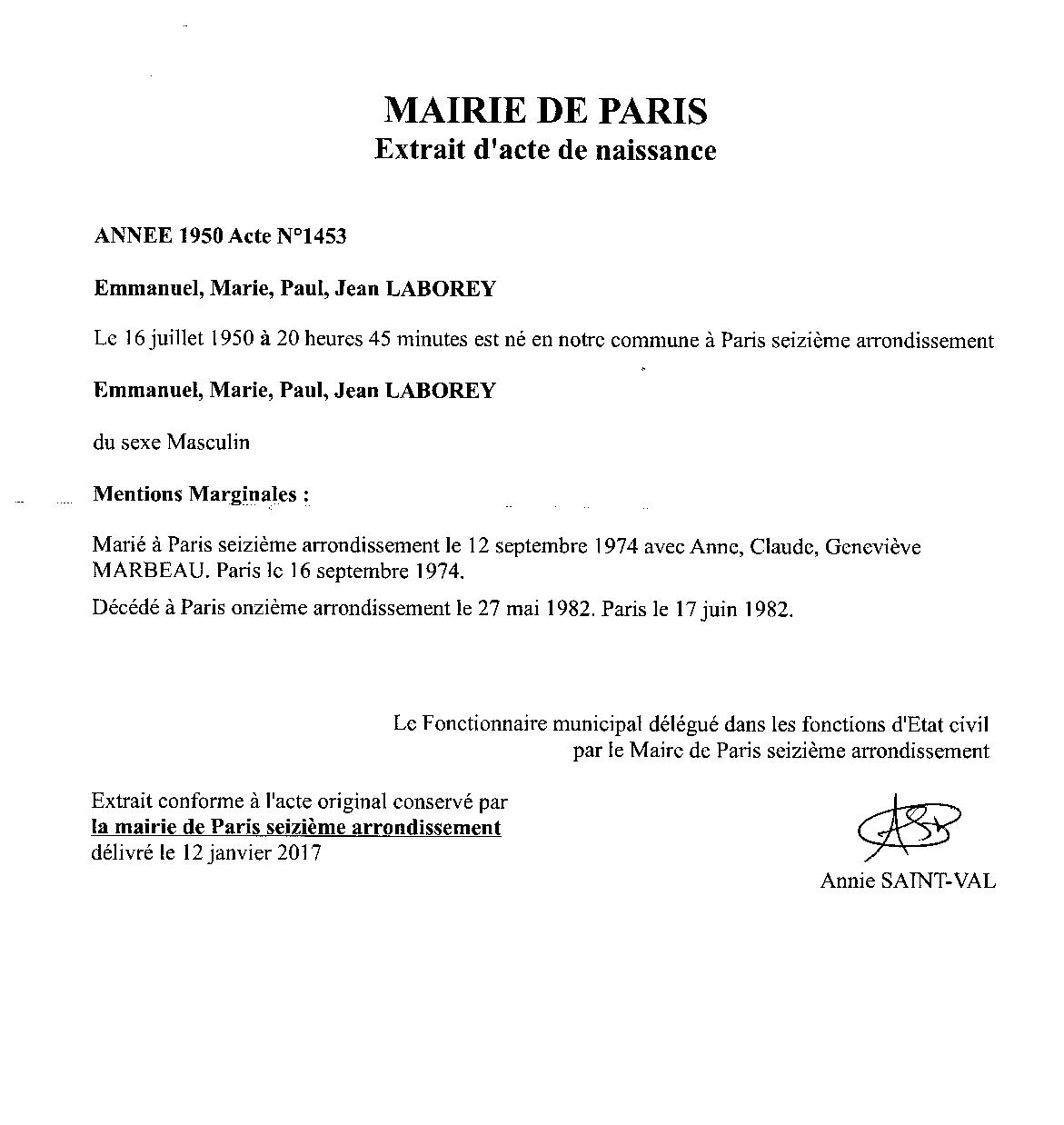
Extract from the birth certificate of Éric Laborey

Éric Laborey, born Emmanuel Marie Paul Jean Laborey, (16 July 1950 – 27 May 1982) was a French actor and director.

== Life and career ==
A native of Paris, Éric Laborey's father was the horticultural engineer Jean Laborey. With Jean-Luc Jeener he co-founded the Parisian theatre company La Compagnie de l'Élan in 1968. He was actively performing and directing plays with this organization until his death in 1982.

Laborey made his screen debut in the lead part of the 1970 film L'Homme de désir; an important work in French gay cinema. He continued to perform as an actor in French film and television for the next 12 years. Other film parts included Bernard Friedmann in Special Section (1975) and Roger Rouxel in The Red Poster (1976). His television credits included the roles of Le vicomte de Rochambeau in the television film Destinée de Monsieur de Rochambeau (1976), Guillaume Pudepièce in the French miniseries Grand-père viking (1976), and François in the miniseries La Filière (1978).

Laborey died in Paris on 27 May 1982 at the age of 31.
