= Élise Rivet =

French Roman Catholic nun (1890–1945)

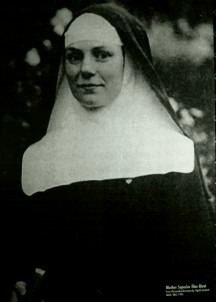
Élise Rivet

Élise Rivet (French pronunciation: [eliz ʁivɛ]; 19 January 1890 – 30 March 1945), also known as Mère Marie Élisabeth de l'Eucharistie, was a Catholic nun and World War II heroine. Rivet volunteered to go to a gas chamber at Ravensbrück concentration camp in place of a mother.

== Early life ==
Rivet was born in Draria, French Algeria to an Alsatian mother and French naval officer father. After the death of her father in 1910, she moved with her mother to Lyon. She worked for a time in a hair salon before joining the convent of the medical sisters of Notre Dame de Compassion in Lyon in 1912. In 1933 she became Mère Marie Élisabeth de l'Eucharistie, the convent's Mother Superior.

== World War II ==
After the fall of France to Nazi Germany in World War II, she began hiding refugees from the Gestapo and eventually used her convent to store weapons and ammunition for the Mouvements Unis de la Résistance (MUR) at the request of Albert Chambonnet.

On 24 March 1944, she and her assistant were arrested by the Gestapo and taken to the Montluc prison in Lyon. From there, she was taken to Romainville near Paris, before being shipped to Ravensbrück concentration camp near Berlin. There, stripped of her religious garments, she was forced into hard labour. Rivet volunteered to go to the gas chamber on 30 March 1945, in place of a mother, only weeks before Germany surrendered. She was 55 years old.

== Legacy ==
In 1961, the government of France honoured her with her portrait on a Heroes of the Resistance postage stamp. A street bearing her name was inaugurated in Brignais near Lyon on 2 December 1979. In 1996, she was recognised as Righteous Among the Nations. In 1997, she was posthumously awarded the Médaille des Justes. In 1999, a lecture hall at the Institut des Sciences de l'Homme in Lyon was named Salle Élise Rivet in her honour. In Neubrandenburg, Mecklenburg-Vorpommern, a nursing home for the elderly was named "Sr. Elisabeth Rivet".

== See also ==
- Maximilian Kolbe
