= Lionel Dubray =

- Born: 31 December 1923; Joinville-le-Pont, France
- Died: 22 July 1944 (aged 20); Colpo, France
- Occupation: French Restistence Fighter
- Years active: 1942–1944

Lionel Dubray (Lionel Henri Gontran Dubray, (31 December 1923 – 22 July 1944) was a member of the French Resistance during World War II.

== Biography ==
Dubray was born on 31 December 1923 in Joinville-le-Pont, a commune in the southeastern suburbs of Paris, France. He was the son of Émile Dubray and Marcelle Pique.

Dubray joined the Resistance in December 1942, enlisting in the Alsace Lorraine des Francs-Tireurs et Partisans (FTP). He participated in numerous attacks against the Germans in and around occupied Paris, most notably in October 1943 against a company of German soldiers during a parade. Later identified by the Gestapo and surrounded, he escaped and fled to Brittany, where he joined the 1st battalion of the French Forces of the Interior (FFI) in Morbihan.

Dubray was taken prisoner on 14 July 1944 in Pluméliau and tortured for eight days. With thirteen others, he was executed on 22 July 1944 in Colpo and buried in a common grave.

== Tributes ==
Dubray's profile is on a 20 centimes commemorative postage stamp issued on 22 April 1961, (Note: "Lionel Dubray". Image of commemorative stamp) one of the Heroes of the Resistance set, twenty-three stamps issued from 1957 to 1961 honoring twenty-seven members of the Resistance who had died during the German Occupation of France. The first day of issue was postmarked in Joinville-le-Pont.

In his honor, a street has been named Rue Lionel Dubray in Athis-Mons, a commune in the southern suburbs of Paris, and a plaque has been attached to his childhood home at 12 Avenue Foch in Joinville-le-Pont.

== See also ==
- Francs-Tireurs et Partisans
- French Forces of the Interior
- Heroes of the Resistance
