= Special Section =

- Directed by: Costa-Gavras
- Written by: Costa-Gavras; Jorge Semprún; Hervé Villeré
- Produced by: Gérard Crosnier
- Starring: Louis Seigner
- Cinematography: Andréas Winding
- Edited by: Françoise Bonnot
- Music by: Éric Demarsan
- Distributed by: Les Artistes Associés
- Release date: 23 April 1975
- Running time: 118 minutes
- Country: France
- Language: French

Special Section (French: Section spéciale) is a 1975 French film directed by Costa-Gavras and based on the novel L'affaire de la Section Spéciale by Hervé Villeré. It stars Louis Seigner, Roland Bertin, Michael Lonsdale, Ivo Garrani, François Maistre, Jacques Spiesser, Henri Serre, Heinz Bennent and Claude Piéplu. It is named after the Special Sections of Vichy France.

The film shared the Best Director prize at the 1975 Cannes Film Festival, and was nominated for Best Foreign Language Film by the U.S. National Board of Review. It was also nominated for a Golden Globe award for best foreign film.

== Plot ==
In France during the German occupation, a young German naval officer is killed in Paris by a group of leftist activists. The compliant Vichy government seeks to appease the Germans by locating the perpetrators and agreeing to the execution of six people, and a special section is set up for this purpose. The section consists of judges who are too ambitious, cowardly or inhuman to refuse such work. The flames of totalitarianism must be stoked, even with innocent blood, and it is especially convenient to the government if the accused are thoroughly expendable in their eyes.

== Cast ==
- Louis Seigner - Le garde des Sceaux
- Roland Bertin - Le secrétaire général du ministère de la Justice
- Michael Lonsdale - Le ministre de l'intérieur
- Ivo Garrani - L'amiral
- François Maistre - Le délégué général
- Jacques Spiesser - Fredo
- Henri Serre - Le délégué du ministère de l'intérieur en zone occupée
- Heinz Bennent - Maj. Beumelburg
- Éric Laborey – Bernard Friedmann
- Pierre Dux - Le procureur général
- Jacques François - Le procureur de l'Etat
- Claudio Gora - Le premier président de la cour d'appel
- Michel Galabru - Le président Cournet
- Claude Piéplu - Le président de la section spéciale
- Hubert Gignoux - Le juge en 'noir'
- Jacques Ouvrier - Le conseiller
- Alain Nobis - Le premier conseiller
- Jean Bouise - Le conseiller Linais
- Nathalie Roussel

== Reception ==
Costa-Gavras' film stirred some controversy as it told a story of Vichy France, which made some critics feel that it was a one-sided piece about collaboration. Costa-Gavras stated that he was aiming for the truth and felt that he achieved it with the film. Despite the debate, it opened to positive reviews in France and the U.S.
