= David Ferdinand Koreff =

German physician

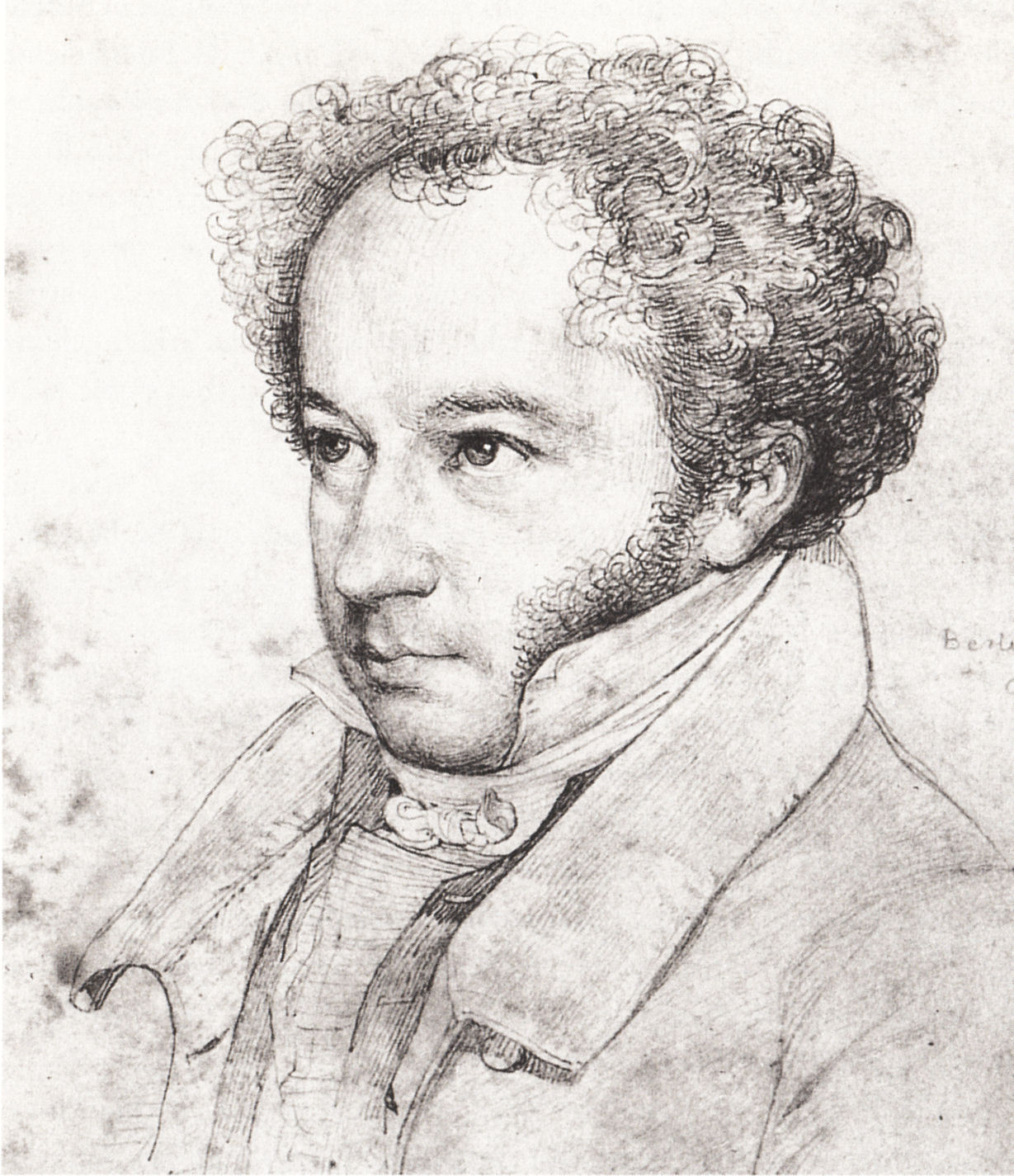
David Ferdinand Koreff (sketch by Wilhelm Hensel)

David Ferdinand Koreff (1 February 1783 – 15 May 1851) was a German medical doctor who was a personal doctor of Staatskanzler Karl August von Hardenberg and occupied one of the two chairs for animal magnetism created in 1817 at the University of Berlin. A personal friend of E.T.A. Hoffmann and a member of his literary club The Serapion Brethren (Serapionsbrüder), Koreff authored a treatise “Über die Erscheinungen des Lebens und über die Gesetze, nach denen es im menschlichen Organismus sich offenbart” and a volume of lyric poetry "Lyrische Gedichte" (published in Paris in 1815).

A year after Hoffmann's death in 1822, Koreff moved to Paris to become the most celebrated authority on animal magnetism for the French literary world. His connections included Victor Hugo, Alexandre Dumas, père, Musset, Mérimée, Chateaubriand, Balzac, Stendhal, Benjamin Constant and Heinrich Heine.

== Books about Koreff ==
- Nicole Edelman, Luis Montiel et Jean-Pierre Peter: Histoire sommaire de la maladie et du somnambulisme de Lady Lincoln. Paris, Ed.Tallandier, 2009.
- Luis Montiel: "Secreto a voces. Una 'enfermedad extraordinaria' y su tratamiento en el París del siglo XIX." Amazon Books, 2021.
