= Raymond Burgard =

French resistance member (1892–1944)

Raymond Burgard (15 September 1892 in Troyes – 15 June 1944 in Cologne) was a French Resistance worker.

== Life ==
Alsatian in origin, he graduated in grammar in 1928. In September 1937, he was made literature professor at lycée Buffon in Paris. A trade unionist, he stood as a candidate for the Syndicat des personnels de l'enseignement secondaire (SPES) in the elections to the Conseil supérieur de l'Instruction publique (CSIP) in May 1938. In September he joined the anti-Munich camp.

A protester from the outset, he founded the resistance movement in Valmy on 21 September 1940, with four friends from the left-leaning Catholic group Jeune République. The group produced several posters, posted on Paris walls or over German posters. One proclaimed Vive la République, quand même (Long live the Republic, whatever happens). Burgard also edited tracts in German aimed at sapping the occupying troops' morale and encouraging them to disobey their officers. In January 1941, he prepared the first edition of the journal Valmy, of which only 50 copies were printed. Burgard produced its editorial, entitled Certitudes .

Thinking himself protected by his Alsatian origins, Raymond Burgard openly participated in the organisation of demonstrations, even encouraging his students to take part in the one on 11 November 1940. In 1941, he participated in the commemoration of Joan of Arc at which several people sang la Marseillaise.

The Valmy group was dismantled in spring 1942 and Raymond Burgard was arrested at his home by the Geheime Feldpolizei (GFP) on 2 April 1942. Some lycéens of the lycée Buffon demonstrated in favour of his release, and were arrested and shot. In 1943, his wife posed for La femme assise by René Iché. Burgard was beheaded in prison at Cologne, on 15 June 1944.

=== Journal Valmy ===
A BBC interview of Paul Simon (interviewer - Jean Oberlé) on 3 February 1942 (published in Les Voix de la Liberté, Documentation française, 1975) ran thus

J. Oberlé : Why have you chosen this title ?
P. Simon : Because the battle of Valmy was the first battle of the Revolution in which the French beat the Prussians. It was also because our little journal bears the motto, below the title, "Only one enemy, the invader".
J. Oberlé : And how have you produced your journal ?
P. Simon : It wasn't easy. The first issue was prepared in January '41. We printed it with a child's printing press. It took us a month to print 50 copies. Each copy consisted of a single sheet of paper, printed front and back.
