= Saint-Germain-des-Prés Library =

University library at Université Paris Cité

- Bibliothèque Saint-Germain-des-Prés
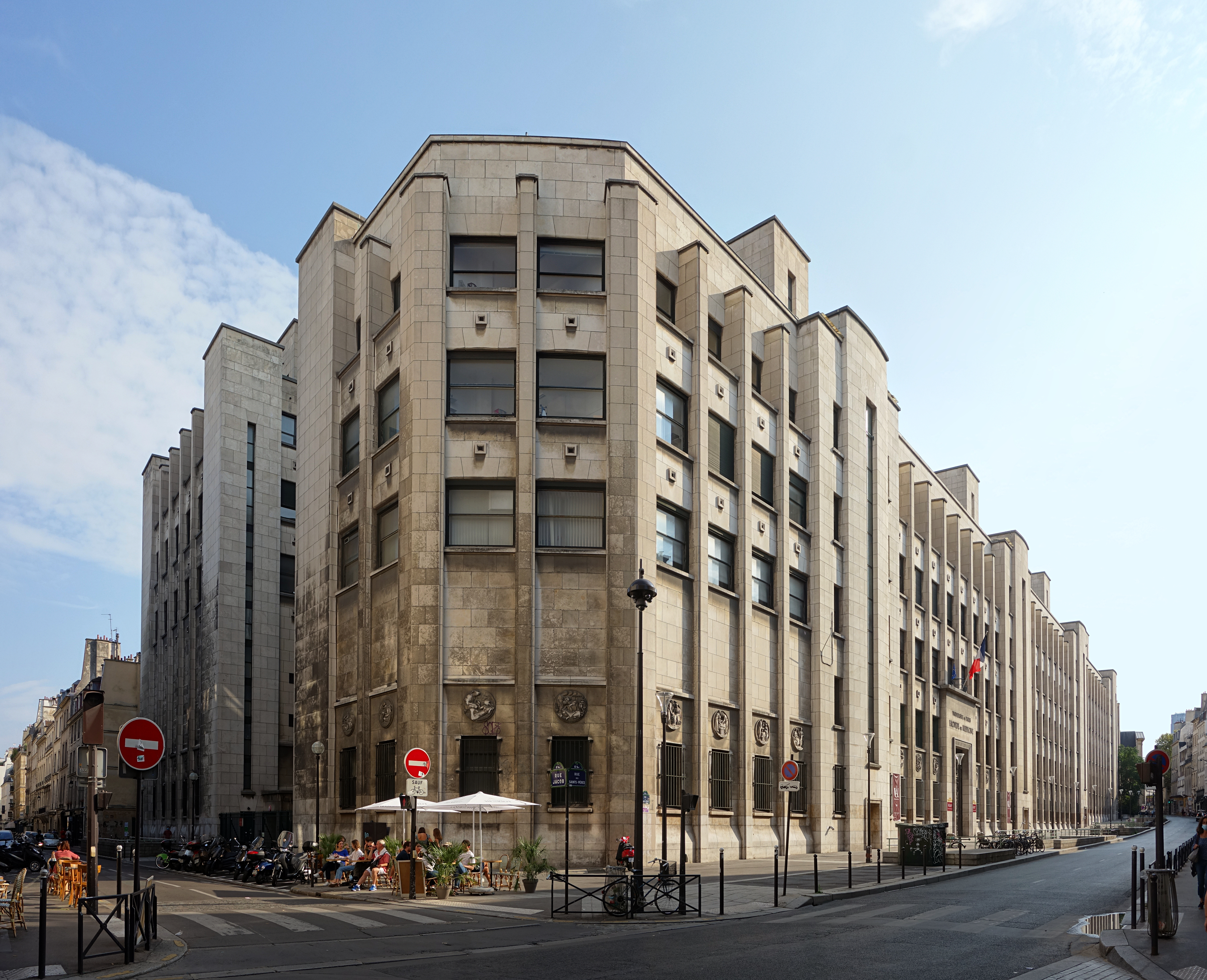
- Location: 45 rue des Saints-Pères, 6th arrondissement, Paris
- Type: Academic library of Paris Cité University
- Established: 1946; 80 years ago, as the University of Paris Sociology Library

Collection
- Items collected: 90,842 documents

Other information
- Website: u-paris.fr/bibliotheques/

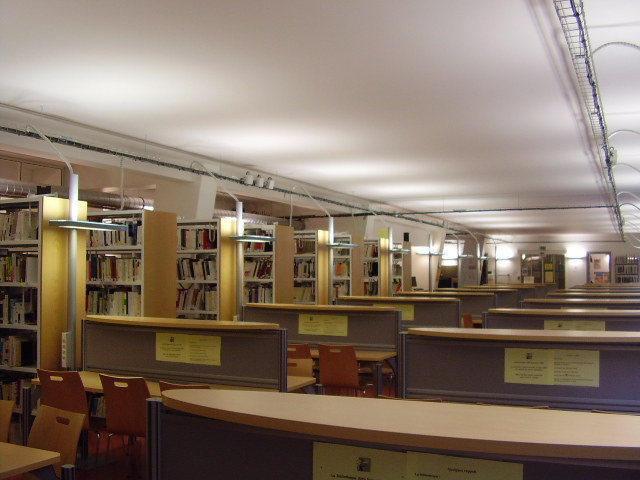
Reading-room of the Library.

The Saint-Germain-des-Prés Library is university library at Université Paris-Cité, located in rue des Saints-Pères, in the Latin Quarter of Paris. It is the heir to the University of Paris Sociology Library, founded in 1946 and one of the most important French libraries concerning sociology, linguistics and science education, and to the science library on the Saint-Germain-dès-Prés campus. The two libraries merged in 2021 and are part of the Paris Cité University Library Network.

The library collaborates with BNF (Bibliothèque nationale de France) as an associated pole (pôle associé) on topics such as health and public policy, Ethics and bioethics, Health sciences and society, drug use and abuse, social psychology.

Being a unité mixte de service (mixed service unit) (UMS 3036), the library depends on both Paris Descartes University (Paris V) and the French National Centre for Scientific Research (CNRS).

== History ==
The collection of the library comes from two different origins :

=== University of Paris-V Human and Social Sciences Libraries ===
A part comes from the former Human and Social Sciences collections of Paris Descartes University (formerly University of Paris-V) – the collections of social sciences and linguistics were held in the Sorbonne and those of science education in a library in Rue des Saints-Pères (6th district of Paris). Part of the major linguistics collection come from the private libraries of well-known 19th and 20th-century scholars such as Abel Hovelacque, Joseph Vendryes, and others.

=== CNRS Sociology Library ===
The main part of the collection comes from the former Sociological Library of the CNRS. The collections increased during the second half of the 20th century. Georges Gurvitch gave books that he had purchased in the United States to the library and Maurice Halbwachs also gave a part of his private library to the Sociological Study Center (Centre d’études sociologiques, CES) just after World War II.

The library, founded by Lucienne Thomas, had the same fate as the CES. First situated in Rue de Varenne (7th arrondissement), it moved to Rue Cardinet (17th arrondissement) in 1959. Its aim is to buy and make available books and knowledge to researchers but also to indicate the resources at a national scale: thus, the library is in charge of the "sociology" section of the Bulletin Signalétique (a kind of bibliography of French science articles) at the beginning of the 1970s.

Jacques Lautman, head of CNRS' Human and Society sciences department, decided to change its name in «Bibliothèque de sociologie du CNRS» (CNRS Sociology Library) in 1986. It moved one more time to Rue Pouchet (next to Rue Cardinet). Closed for a time while being reorganized, it reopened in 2004: it then held 50,000 sociological books and a collection of 1,500 periodicals. In 2006, it became part of the new Human and Social Sciences Library Paris Descartes-CNRS.

== The library currently ==
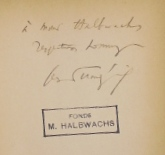
Book signed by Georges Dumézil and offered to Maurice Halbwachs. Maurice Halbwachs Collection

The library reopened at the end of 2006, at the same time that Paris Descartes Social Sciences Faculty moved from the Sorbonne to its new location in Rue des Saints-Pères.

It is a library reserved for scientific research, mainly for grad students, scholars, social and human scientists from all universities and scientific centers. It possesses a collection of more than 80,000 books and 2,000 periodicals (of which at least 500 subscriptions are running) - add all the electronics periodicals and reviews subscriptions bought by the University Library. In 2008, the former "Friends of Centre d'Études Sociologiques'Society" (SACES) has entrusted to the library some photographic portraits of sociologists : Raymond Aron, André Davidovitch, Émile Durkheim, Georges Friedmann, Louis Gernet, Alain Girard, Marcel Granet, Georges Gurvitch, Maurice Halbwachs, Robert Hertz, Lucien Lévy-Bruhl, Marcel Mauss, Pierre Naville, Pierre Joseph Proudhon, Jean Stoetzel. The complete collection consists of 15 framed photographs, size 32.5 × 38.5 cm (12.79 × 15.15 in). Part of this collection is available on the open archive MediHAL

But it is also an experimental library for new tool for scientific information circulation in France and abroad. The library plays an important part to digitize French Social Sciences reviews for Persée website (created by French Education Ministry). It also plays a leading role in several national projects of CNRS such as TGE-Adonis and Isore.

== See also ==
- List of libraries in France
