= Simone Michel-Lévy =

French resistance member

Simone Michel-Lévy

Simone Michel-Lévy (19 January 1906 – 13 April 1945) was a French Resistance worker. She had several pseudonyms – Emma, Françoise, Madame Royale, Mademoiselle Flaubert or Madame Bertrand - and is one of 6 female compagnons de la Libération (decreed on 26 September 1945).

== World War II ==
Joining the staff of the PTT in 1924, she was allowed into the rédacteurs course in 1941 and made regional director of telephones, in which role she got involved in the "commutation" of telephonic communication, in Paris. This was a strategic position, which she used to set up a clandestine information network, in particular communication with Normandy, where her activities allowed the establishment of a radio network later used at the time of D-Day. Her Resistance activity went further, however - she organised a courier system to get messages to England, diverted telegraph and telephone material to Resistance groups, and sabotaged departures for the STO.

She was arrested by the Gestapo on 5 November 1943 and tortured by Georges Delfanne. Without having given away even her name, she was deported to Ravensbrück, then Flossenbürg, where she managed to organise a rising against the camp guards. It was for this that she was hanged ten days before the camp was liberated by the Allies.

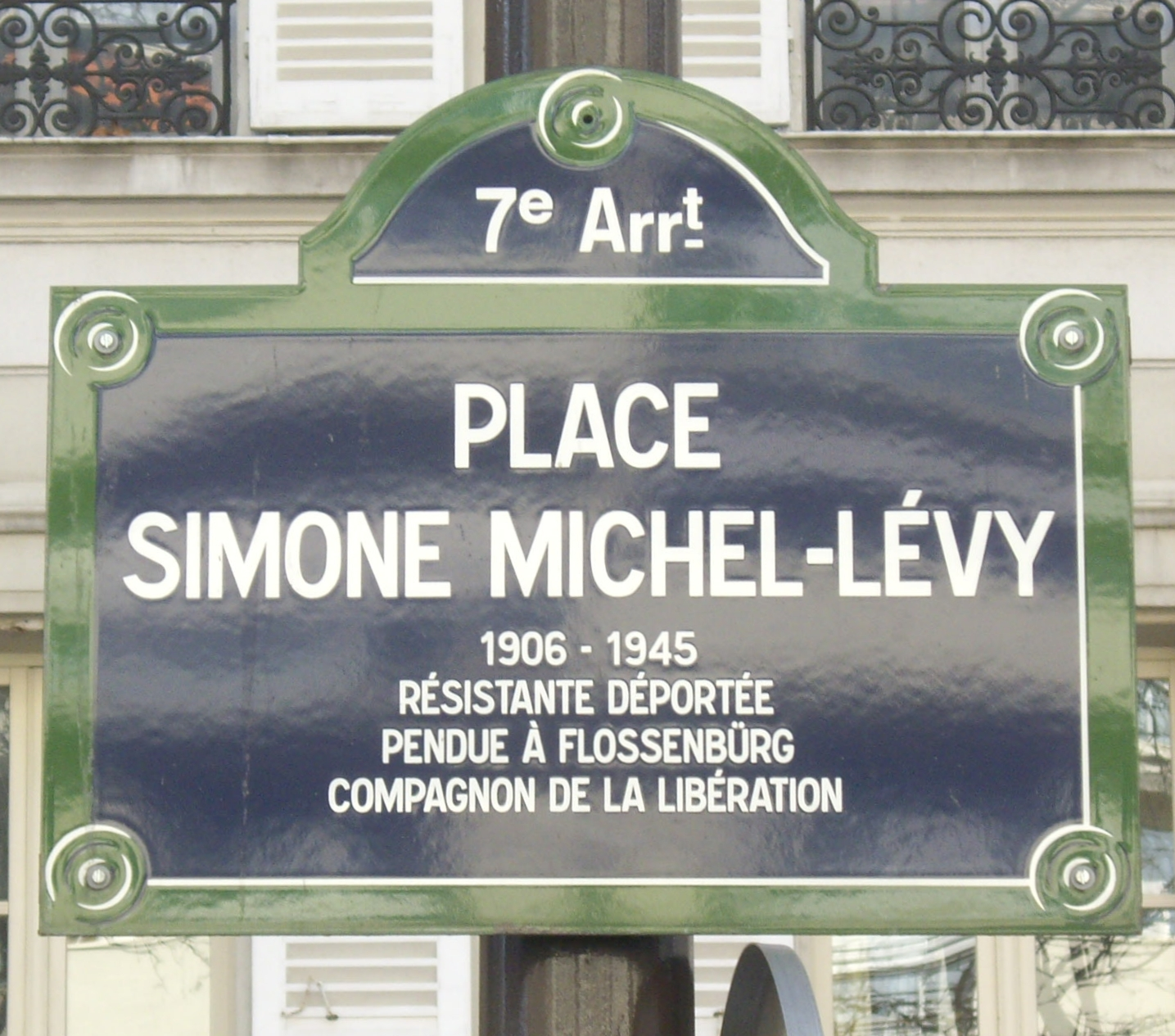
The plaque for the Place Simone Michel-Lévy in Paris, dedicated to her memory in 2006.

== Legacy ==
Simone Michel-Lévy was one of twenty-six Resistance members to be commemorated in the Heroes of the Resistance postage stamp series. In 2006, la Place Simone Michel-Lévy was established in Paris to honor her contributions to the French Resistance movement.

== Sources ==
- Messages des PTT, n° 342, December 1984: "Quarante ans après l'histoire s'entrouvre. Les agents des PTT et la Résistance."
