= 8th Signal Regiment (France) =

French Army signal regiment

The 8th Signal Regiment (French: 8e Régiment de Transmissions, 8e RT) is a signal unit in the French Army. It is a part of the Signal Brigade.

== History ==
=== First World War ===
Following the general mobilisation of 2 August 1914, the 8th Engineer Regiment had, by 30 September 1914, formed eight army telegraph companies, twenty-six corps or reserve group telegraph detachments, thirty telegraph detachments for isolated or reserve infantry divisions, and nine for cavalry divisions, as well as one telegraph and one radiotelegraph company in Morocco, for a total strength of about 12,000 men including 150 officers.

=== Second World War and later role ===
After the defeat of the French Army in 1940 many regiments were disbanded, including the 8th Engineer Regiment (many of whose personnel entered the French Resistance). The number “8” reappears on 1 April 1946 at Fort Mont-Valérien with the formation of the 8th Signal Battalion. Exactly a year later, 1 April 1947, the battalion is transformed into the 8th Signal Regiment, inheriting the honors and traditions of the 24th Telegraph Sapper Battalion and 8th Engineer Regiment.

== Honors ==
=== Battle Honors ===
- Maroc 1907-1913
- Flandres 1915
- Verdun 1916
- La Somme 1916
- La Malmaison 1917
- Resistance 1940-1944

=== Decorations ===
- Croix de Guerre 1939-1945 with one palm.

== Sources ==
- Service historique de la Défense (1920). "Historique du 8e régiment du génie pendant la campagne 1914–1918". Gallica (in French).
