= Special Sections =

The Special Sections (Sections spéciales) was a Vichy law writ into statute on 14 August 1941.

== History ==
They were tribunals set up in Vichy France, one for each Court of Appeal, charged with judging Communists and anarchists. They were organised by the Vichy authorities during the German reprisals for the assassination on the métro Barbès by Pierre Georges on 21 August 1941. They feature in the 1975 film Section spéciale.
