= Pál Simon (politician) =

Hungarian politician (1929–2021)

Minister of Heavy Industry
- In office 4 July 1975 – 31 December 1980
- Prime Minister: György Lázár
- Preceded by: Gyula Szekér
- Succeeded by: Lajos Méhes (Minister of Industry)

Personal details
- Born: 17 February 1929 Miskolc, Hungary
- Died: 6 February 2021 (aged 91)
- Party: MDP (1947–1956); MSZMP (1956–1989)
- Profession: politician, chemical engineer

Pál Simon (17 February 1929 – 6 February 2021) was a Hungarian chemical engineer, politician and diplomat, who served as the last Minister of Heavy Industry in the cabinet of Prime Minister György Lázár from 1975 to 1980. He was also Hungarian Ambassador to Yugoslavia between 1981 and 1985.

== Studies ==
Pál Simon was born in Miskolc on 17 February 1929. After graduating from elementary school in his birthplace, he continued his studies in a teacher training at the local Kossuth Lajos Lutheran Secondary School and then enrolled in the Department of Chemical Engineering at the Budapest University of Technology (BME). After earning his degree, he served as a lieutenant engineer in the Fuel Laboratory of the Air Force Command from October 1952. He was a postgraduate student at the Lomonosov Institute in Moscow from September 1955. He defended his dissertation in 1959. From that year, he worked at the Hungarian Petroleum and Natural Gas Experimental Institute as a research engineer and then as a deputy director.

== Career ==
Simon was appointed the first director of the Danube Petroleum Company (Hungarian: Dunai Kőolajipari Vállalat) in Százhalombatta in 1962. He served in this capacity until 1973. Under his guidance, the company was responsible for preparing plans, purchasing technological processes and equipment, putting equipment into operation, training staff, and organizing production in Százhalombatta, which became one of the final destinations of the oil Friendship Pipeline. He was awarded the title of Honorary Associate Professor of the University of Chemical Industry in Veszprém in 1968. Simon was appointed CEO of the National Petroleum and Gas Trust (legal predecessor of the MOL Group) in 1973, holding the position until the next year.

Simon was a member of the ruling Communist Hungarian Working People's Party (MDP) from 1947 to 1956, then its successor Hungarian Socialist Workers' Party (MSZMP) from 1956. Simon functioned as Deputy Minister of Heavy Industry in the government of Jenő Fock from 15 October 1974 to 4 July 1975. Succeeding Gyula Szekér, he served as the last Minister of Heavy Industry in the Hungarian People's Republic from 4 July 1975 to 31 December 1980. Thereafter, Simon was the Hungarian Ambassador to Yugoslavia between 25 May 1981 and 8 July 1985.

Returning to Hungary, Simon served as CEO of the Prodinform Technical Consulting Company from 1985 to 1991. He was a member of the editorial board of the Magyar Kémikusok Lapja ("Hungarian Journal of Chemists") from January 1989, and he was the vice-president of the Industrial Quality Club of the Mechanical Engineering Scientific Association (GTE) from March 1989. He retired in 1991.

Pál Simon died on 6 February 2021 after a brief illness, aged 91, eleven days short from his 92nd birthday.

Political offices
Preceded by Gyula Szekér	Minister of Heavy Industry; 1975–1980	Succeeded by Lajos Méhes (Industry)
