= Maurice Halbwachs =

French sociologist

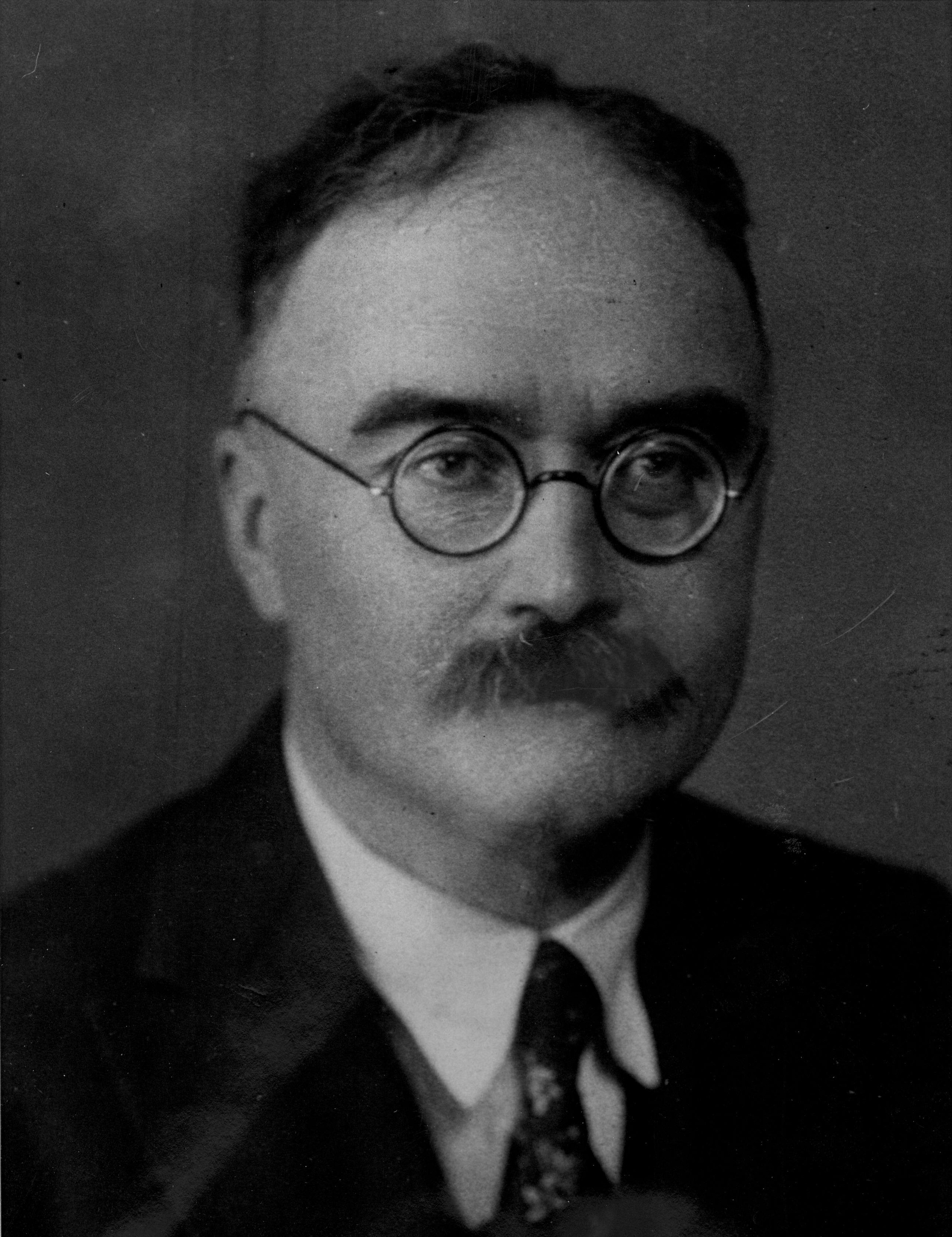
- Born: 11 March 1877; Reims, France
- Died: 15 March 1945 (aged 68); Buchenwald concentration camp, Nazi Germany
- Relatives: Jeanne Halbwachs (sister)

Education
- Academic advisors: Henri Bergson, Émile Durkheim

Philosophical work
- Doctoral students: Jean Stoetzel
- Main interests: Sociology, philosophy, social psychology, sociology of knowledge
- Notable ideas: Collective memory

Maurice Halbwachs (French: [mɔʁis albvaks]; 11 March 1877 – 16 March 1945) was a French philosopher and sociologist known for developing the concept of collective memory. Halbwachs also contributed to the sociology of knowledge with his La Topographie Legendaire des Évangiles en Terre Sainte, a study of the spatial infrastructure of the New Testament (1951).

== Early life and education ==
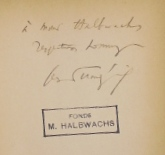
Book signed by Georges Dumézil and offered to Maurice Halbwachs in the Human and Social Sciences Library Paris Descartes-CNRS, Maurice Halbwachs Collection.

Born in Reims, Halbwachs attended the École Normale Supérieure in Paris. There he studied philosophy with Henri Bergson, who had a major influence on his thinking. Halbwachs' early work on memory was in some measure pursued to coincide with Bergson's view on the subject of memory being a particularly personal and subjective experience. Bergson taught Halbwachs for three years. He then aggregated in philosophy in 1901. He taught at various lycées before traveling to Germany in 1904, where he studied at the University of Göttingen and worked on cataloging Leibniz's papers until 1907. He was nominated to co-edit an edition of Leibniz's work which never came to fruition.

He returned to France in 1905 and met Émile Durkheim, who sparked his interest in sociology. Initially, when meeting Durkheim, Halbwachs was looking for advice on how to move from his previous focus on Philosophy to Sociology. Halbwachs also began to focus on scientific objectivism rather than his Bergsonian Individualism. He soon joined the editorial board of L'Année Sociologique, where he worked with François Simiand and Lévy-Bruhl editing the Economics and Statistics sections. In 1909 he returned to Germany to study Marxism and economics in Berlin. Durkheim gave Halbwachs the idea of societal movements and how the environment, people are influenced by Sociological research. This also goes into how different class systems function in broad networks of society.

== Career ==
Throughout World War I, Halbwachs worked at the War Ministry. Beginning in 1919, shortly after the end of the war, he became professor of sociology and pedagogy at the University of Strasbourg (1919). He remained in this position for over a decade, taking leave for a year in 1930 as a visiting professor at the University of Chicago, when he was called to the Sorbonne in 1935. There he taught sociology and worked closely with Marcel Mauss and served as the editor of Annales de Sociologie, the successor journal to L'Année Sociologique. He taught as a professor of sociology in Sorbonne, Paris from 1935 to 1943 and a professor of social psychology at the College de France from 1943 until death. From 1935 until his death he also served as the secretary-general of Annales de Sociologie. In 1944 he received one of France's highest honors, a chair at the Collège de France in social psychology. During this time, Halbwachs dedicated his time to in-depth research in the field where sociology and psychology overlap to provide a bit of a timeline. Towards the end of his life, Halbwachs was recognized for his contributions to sociology. He was elected into the Conservative Académie des Sciences Morales et Politiques. He was also recognized as the Vice President of the French Psychological Society, while also being called to chair at Sorbonne.

== Personal life and death ==
He was married to Yvonne Basch, who introduced Halbwachs to her father, the president of the League for the Defense Human Rights and also influenced him to join the Jewish religion (he was born Catholic). He had a son, Pierre Halbwachs (1916–1987), who influenced Gilles Deleuze in the 1940s.

A longtime socialist, Halbwachs and his sons were detained by the Gestapo in Paris in July, 1944 after protesting the arrest of his Jewish father-in-law. He and his youngest son Pierre were deported to the concentration camp Buchenwald. He died of dysentery in March 1945.

In 1940, Halbwachs' brother in-law, Georges Basch committed suicide. His parents in-law Victor and Mme Basch aged 84 years old at the time were murdered by Germans.

Part of his books were offered by his widow to the library of the Centre d'études sociologiques and are now held at the Human and Social Sciences Library Paris Descartes-CNRS.

In 1950, his work on collective memory was published posthumously by his sister.

== Main ideas ==
Halbwachs' most important contribution to the field of sociology appeared in his posthumous book La Mémoire collective, 1950 ("The Collective Memory"), in which he advanced the thesis that a society can have a collective memory and that this memory is dependent upon the "cadre" or framework within which a group is situated in society. Thus, there is not only an individual memory but also a group memory that exists outside of and lives beyond the individual. An individual's understanding of the past is strongly linked to this group consciousness because every person can contribute a different memory or perspective to the collective group memory. Group memory is also different for every group that experiences a certain event, therefore "every group has its own collective memory and that collective memory differs from the collective memory of other groups. This idea of memory being pursued proves people's expression of commemoration in our culture. Commemoration offers collective memory ties to society and its conceptions where physical monuments and rituals fix and affirm collectivity.

Halbwachs' Collective Memory includes two laws governing how this form of memory will evolve: a Law of Fragmentation, and a Law of Concentration.

Halbwachs also wrote an important book on suicide, Les Causes du suicide, 1930 ("The Causes of Suicide"). In this book he followed in the footsteps of his mentor Émile Durkheim (also a French sociologist), expanding and elaborating upon the Durkheim's theories on suicide. Specifically, he focused on ideas such as, the ways in which rural and urban styles of life explain variations in suicide rates. Halbwachs also continued to further Durkheim's conceptualization of how specific family styles and religious backgrounds alter rates of suicide.

Halbwachs included in his Les Cadres Sociaux de la Memoire (1925) the significance of the collective memory operating on the systems of family, religion and social communities.

Halbwachs takes an interesting perspective regarding the relationship between memory and history. He believed that memory and history oppose each other when it comes to reliability. Memory can be transformed based on perspective, which makes it a questionable form of scholarly appreciation for the past, whereas historians attempt to analyze history from a completely unbiased perspective, analyzing it in a critical way from a distance.

Halbwachs contributed to the world of social psychology as well with his thesis on La Classe ouvrière et les niveaux de vie, which translates to "The Working Class and the Standards of Living". This work allowed Halbwachs to analyze and observe how working-class families managed their budgets. He discovered that families and individuals not only plan out their budget for what they need in the moment but what they also need in the future, which forces them to put into perspective what is necessary in the moment. His research is a modification of Durkheim's theory of collective representations.

== Influence and legacy ==
Halbwachs showed how memory can not exist without society influencing the mind, embracing how collective consciousness impacts us each and every day. This taught us that social structure shapes the way we think an act on the world. He also establishes the difference between memory which is subjective and history is factual in its background.

The Bauhaus University at Weimar, Thuringia, Germany, close to the concentration camp that Halbwachs was murdered in, renamed their biggest lecture hall in the sociologist's honour in 2024.

== Published works ==
- Halbwachs, Maurice, On collective memory, Chicago, The University of Chicago Press, 1992
  - translated from: Les cadres sociaux de la mémoire, Paris, Presses Universitaires de France, 1952, originally published in Les Travaux de L'Année Sociologique, Paris, F. Alcan, 1925
  - edited, translated and introduction by Lewis A. Coser, includes a translation of the conclusion of: La Topographie légendaire des évangiles en terre sainte: étude de mémoire collective, Paris, Presses Universitaires de France, 1941
- Halbwachs, Maurice, The collective memory, New York, Harper & Row Colophon Books, 1980, 182 pages
  - pdfs of chapters 1 and 2 available (pp. 22–49 and 50–87) on UCSB Collective Memory seminar website
  - translated from: La mémoire collective, Paris, Presses Universitaires de France, 1950
    - Complete synthesis on all of his observations of memory
    - Published after his death
  - introduction by Mary Douglas, includes a translation of: ‘La mémoire collective chez les musiciens’, Revue philosophique, no. 3 – 4 (1939)
- Halbwachs, Maurice, La topographie légendaire des évangiles en Terre sainte, 1941
  - Reprinted in 2017, can be found on Amazon (ISBN 978-2130788973)
  - Studies how memory is changed over a period of time in a single-setting
  - Complete synthesis on all of his observations of memory
  - Published after his death
- Halbwachs, Maurice, The Psychology of Social Class, London, Forgotten Books, 2017
  - Reprinted Classic available on Amazon in both hard and paperback copies (ISBN 9-78028-290759-4)
- Halbwachs, Maurice, Les causes du suicide, Paris, Presses Universitaires de France, 1930
