= Paul Simon (disambiguation) =

Paul Simon (born 1941) is an American musician and songwriter.

Paul Simon may also refer to:

- Paul Ludwig Simon (1771–1815), German architect and professor
- Paul Simon (politician) (1928–2003), United States Representative and Senator from Illinois
- Paul Simon (drummer) (born 1950), British punk rock and New Wave drummer
- Paul Simon (album), a 1972 self-titled album by the American musician Paul Simon
- "Paul Simon", a 2005 song by The Russian Futurists

== See also ==
- Paul E. Simons, U.S. diplomat
- Paul Simonon (born 1955), English rock bassist, most notably of the Clash
- Paul Symon (born 1960), Director-General of the Australian Secret Intelligence Service
