= Paul Petit (writer) =

French writer, sociologist, diplomat and worker

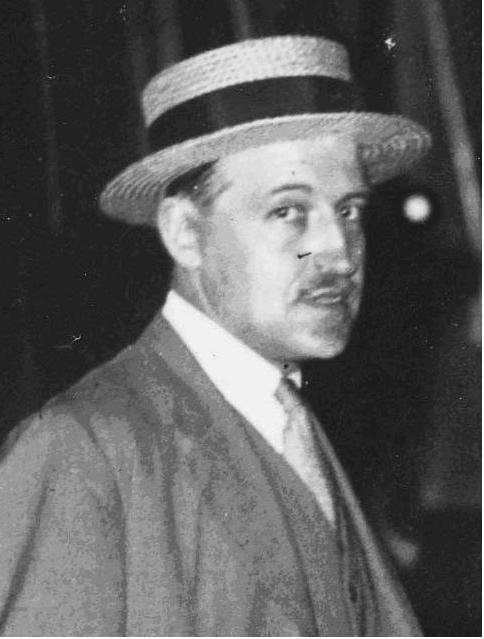
Paul Petit

Paul Petit (2 May 1893 – 24 August 1944) was a French writer, sociologist, diplomat and French Resistance worker.

Arrested on 7 February 1942, Paul Petit was deported to the prison Saarbrücken 9 July 1942. Sentenced to death on 16 October 1943, by 2 e Senate Volksgerichtshof, along with his co-accused Martin Marietta and Raymond Burgard, he was beheaded at the Cologne prison (Germany) on 24 August 1944.

== Translations of Kierkegaard ==
Petit produced French translations of the work of two works of the Danish philosopher Søren Kierkegaard: the Concluding Unscientific Postscript to Philosophical Fragments (French: Post-scriptum aux Miettes philosophiques), published in 1941; and Philosophical Fragments (French: Les mietes philosophiques), published posthumously in 1947.
